= List of ports and harbors of the Arctic Ocean =

This is a list of ports and harbors of the Arctic Ocean. The entries are sorted travelling east from the International Date Line.

== North America ==
=== Canada ===
Location	Province / Territory	Water body	Coordinates	Features & notes	Image
Tuktoyaktuk	Northwest Territories	Beaufort Sea	69°27′03″N 133°02′09″W	Port Brabant to 1950	
Churchill	Manitoba	Hudson Bay	58°46′45″N 94°11′36″W		
Iqaluit	Nunavut	Frobisher Bay	63°44′58″N 68°31′18″W	Opened 25 July 2023	

=== Greenland ===
Location	Municipality	Water body	Coordinates	Features & notes	Image
Nuuk Port and Harbour	Sermersooq	Labrador Sea	64°10′15″N 51°43′15″W		
Port of Ilulissat	Avannaata	Disko Bay	69°13′19″N 51°05′42″W		

=== United States ===
Location	State	Water body	Coordinates	Features & notes	Image
Kivilina	Alaska	Chukchi Sea	67°43′38″N 164°32′21″W	US rank:86	
Utqiaġvik	Alaska	Chukchi Sea	71°17′26″N 156°47′19″W		
Prudhoe Bay	Alaska	Beaufort Sea	70°19′32″N 148°42′41″W		

== Europe ==
=== Iceland ===
Location	Regions	Water body	Coordinates	Features & notes	Image
Akureyri	Northeastern	Eyjafjörður	65°41′00″N 18°06′00″W		

=== Norway ===
Location	County	Water body	Coordinates	Features & notes	Image
Tromsø	Troms	Grøtsundet	69°40′58″N 18°56′34″E		
Hammerfest	Finnmark	Barents Sea	70°39′48″N 23°40′56″E		
Honningsvåg	Finnmark	Barents Sea	70°58′43″N 25°58′36″E		
Kirkenes	Finnmark	Varangerfjord	69°43′37″N 30°02′44″E		
Vardø	Finnmark	Barents Sea	70°22′13″N 31°06′38″E		

=== Russia ===
Location	Federal subject	Water body	Coordinates	Features & notes	Image
Vitino	Murmansk Oblast	Kandalaksha Gulf	67°05′00″N 32°20′00″E		
Kandalaksha	Murmansk Oblast	White Sea	67°09′25″N 32°24′42″E		
Port of Murmansk	Murmansk Oblast	Barents Sea	68°58′48″N 33°03′22″E		
Severomorsk	Murmansk Oblast	Barents Sea	69°04′00″N 33°25′00″E		
Belomorsk	Republic of Karelia	Onega Bay	64°31′31″N 34°45′57″E		
Port of Arkhangelsk	Arkhangelsk Oblast	Northern Dvina	64°32′00″N 40°30′00″E		
Naryan-Mar	Nenets Autonomous Okrug	Pechora River	67°38′00″N 53°03′00″E		
Sabetta	Yamalo-Nenets Autonomous Okrug	Kara Sea	71°16′24″N 72°04′21″E		
Dudinka	Krasnoyarsk Krai	Yenisey	69°24′23″N 86°10′35″E		
Dikson	Krasnoyarsk Krai	Kara Sea	73°30′00″N 80°31′00″E		
Igarka	Krasnoyarsk Krai	Yenisey	67°28′00″N 86°35′00″E		
Tiksi	Sakha Republic	Laptev Sea	71°39′00″N 128°52′00″E		
Port of Pevek	Chukotka Autonomous Okrug	Chaunskaya Bay	69°42′17″N 170°15′49″E		
