= Chukotka Mountains =

Mountain range in eastern Russia

- Чукотское нагорье
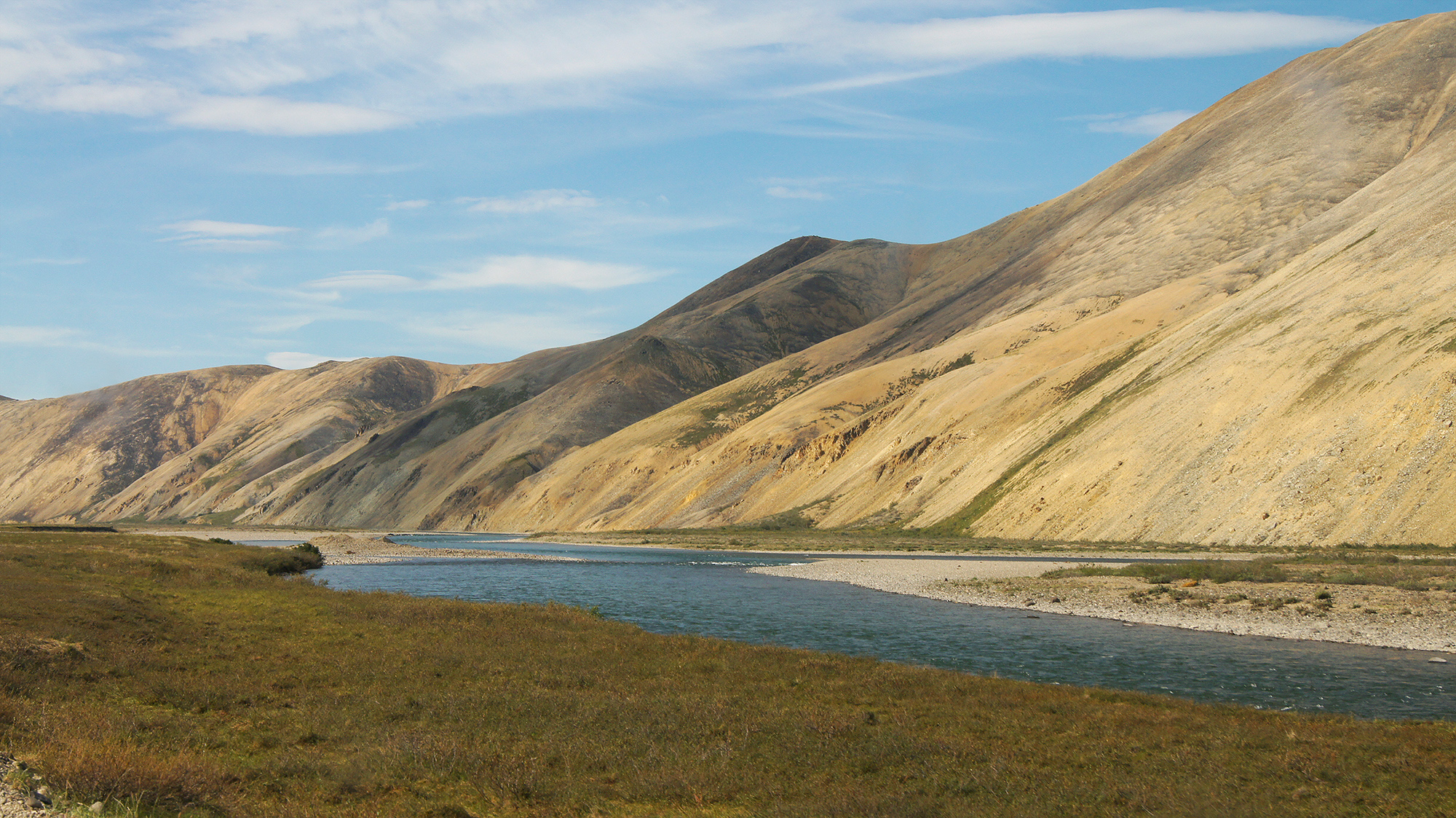
- Landscape of the Palyavaam Range

Highest point
- Peak: Iskhodnaya
- Elevation: 1,843 m (6,047 ft)

Dimensions
- Length: 1,300 km (810 mi)

Geography
- Location within Chukotka Autonomous Okrug
- Country: Russia
- Federal subject: Chukotka Autonomous Okrug
- Range coordinates: 68°0′N 177°0′E
- Parent range: East Siberian System

Geology
- Rock ages: Jurassic, Triassic, Permian and Proterozoic
- Rock types: Sandstone, shale with granite intrusions and volcanic rocks

The Chukotka Mountains (Russian: Чукотское нагорье, romanized: Chukotskoye Nagorye) or Chukotka Upland (Russian: Чукотская горная страна, romanized: Chukotskaya Gornaya Strana) is a mountainous area in the Chukotka Autonomous Okrug, Far Eastern Federal District, Russia.

The ridges of this system are largely barren and desolate. About half of their area is above the Arctic Circle. The climate is one of the harshest in the Russian Federation, with minimum absolute temperatures reaching −73 °C. Traditionally, Chukchi people lived only in few intermontane areas, such as the Amguema valley that cuts across the vast mountain zone.

== Geography ==
The Chukotka Mountains are one of the two main mountain regions of Chukotka. They rise west and east of the isthmus area of the Chukchi Peninsula, in the central Chukotka region, bounded by the Anadyr Highlands in the southwest. They are composed of mountains of middle height displaying alpine relief, as well as low mountains. They stretch roughly WNW/ESE for 450 kilometers (280 mi), between the head of Chaun Bay and the Bering Sea shore. The ranges of the northern area consist of sandstone and shale with granite intrusions, while those of the southern part are made up of volcanic rocks. The highest peak is Mount Iskhodnaya (Исходная) in the Chantal Range, which is 1,843 metres (6,047 ft) high — or 1,887 metres (6,191 ft) according to other sources.

=== Hydrography ===
Among the rivers that have their source in the mountains, the following deserve mention: the Amguema River with its tributaries Ekityki and Chantalveergyn, the Palyavaam, Pegtymel, and Tanyurer of the Chukchi Sea side, as well as the Kanchalan and the Belaya River tributaries Bolshoi Pykarvaam and Bolshaya Osinovaya of the Pacific Ocean side. The largest lakes in the mountain area are Ekityki, Ervynaygytgyn, Yanranaygytgyn, Ioni, Pychgynmygytgyn, Medvezhye, Achchyon, and Koolen.

There are 47 small glaciers in the ranges of the highlands, with a total area of 13.53 square kilometers (5.22 sq mi).

=== Subranges ===
The system of the Chukotka Mountains comprises a number of subranges, including the following:

- Shelag Range, highest point 1,105 metres (3,625 ft) — the northwesternmost, reaching up to Cape Shelagsky.
- Ichuveem Range, highest point 1,030 metres (3,380 ft).
- Ekvyvatap Range, highest point 1,636 metres (5,367 ft).
- Pegtymel Range, highest point 1,794 metres (5,886 ft).
- Palyavaam Range, highest point 1,551 metres (5,089 ft).
- Chantal Range, highest point 1,887 metres (6,191 ft).
- Ekityk Range, highest point 1,317 metres (4,321 ft).
- Pekulney Range, highest point 1,362 metres (4,469 ft).
- Iskaten Range, highest point 1,335 metres (4,380 ft).
- Ghenkanyi Range, highest point 978 metres (3,209 ft) — the easternmost, near the Bering Sea.

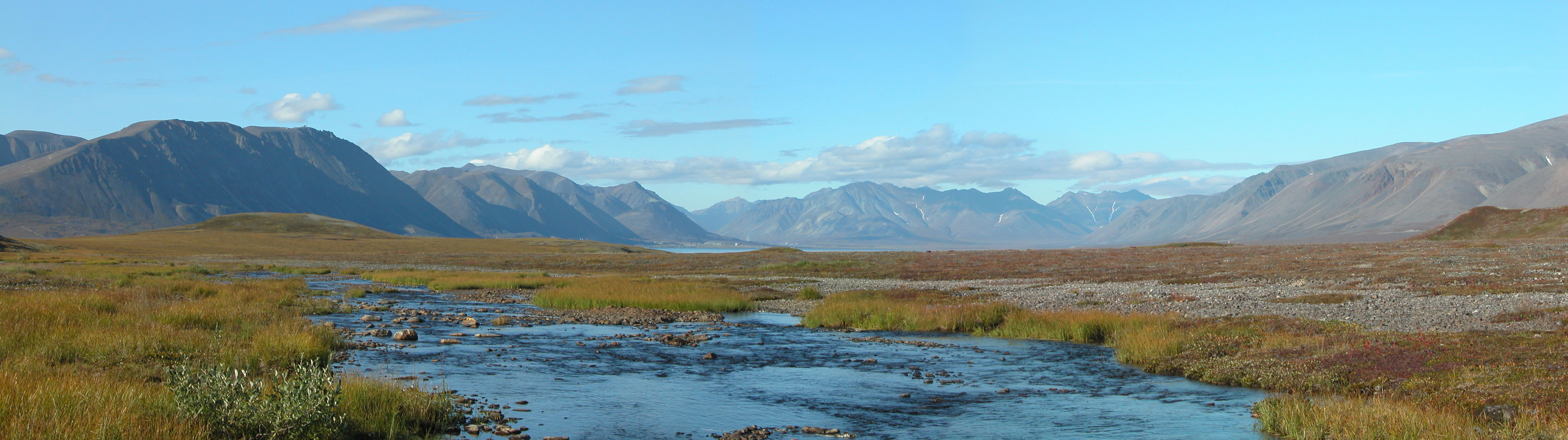
Panorama of the Chukotka Mountains near Egvekinot.

== Climate ==
The climate of the Chukotka Mountains area is severe, with short cool summers and very cold 8-month-long winters where blizzards are common owing to the influence of both the Arctic Ocean and the Aleutian Low. The valley areas have a continental climate, while the mountain ranges are under the influence of an oceanic climate, which is felt more in the lower-altitude mountains and less in the medium-high ones.

== Flora and fauna ==
The lower slopes of the mountains have tundra vegetation, often marshy in the intermontane basins, while the higher altitudes are Arctic desert. Rivers are abundant in fish.
