= Rytkuchi =

Rytkuchi Рыткучи Ырыткучьын (Chukchi)
- Selo
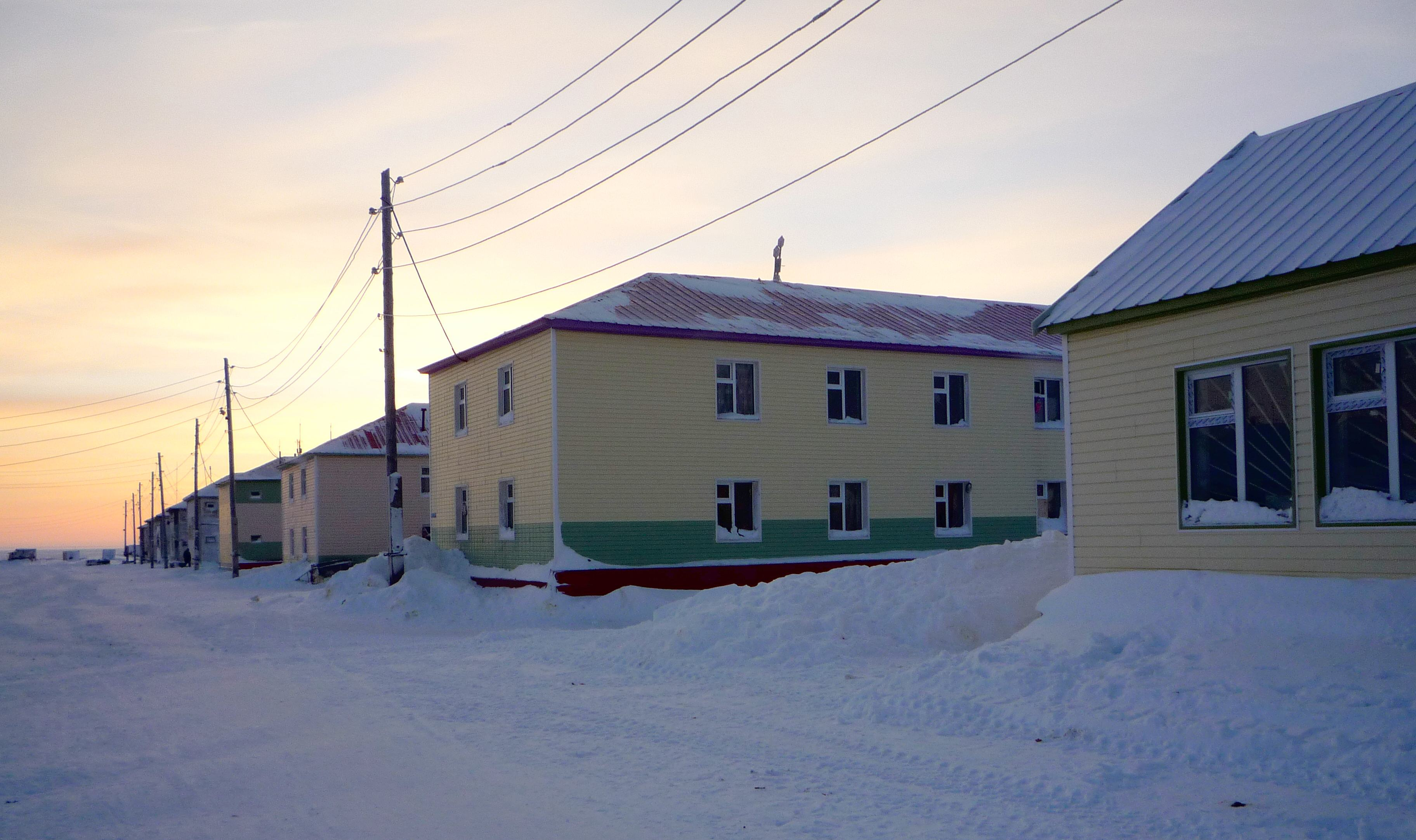
- Winter view of Rytkuchi
- Interactive map of Rytkuchi
- Location of Rytkuchi Rytkuchi (Chukotka Autonomous Okrug)
- Coordinates: 68°53′47″N 170°42′58″E
- Country: Russia
- Federal subject: Chukotka Autonomous Okrug
- Administrative district: Chaunsky District
- Founded: 1934

Area
  - Total: 0.486 km^{2} (0.188 sq mi)

Population (2010 Census)
  - Total: 517
  - Estimate (January 2016): 455 (−12%)
  - Density: 1,060/km^{2} (2,760/sq mi)

Municipal status
  - Municipal district: Chaunsky Municipal District
  - Rural settlement: Rytkuchi Rural Settlement
  - Capital of: Rytkuchi Rural Settlement
- Time zone: UTC+12 (MSK+9)
- Postal code: 689425
- Dialing code: +7 42737
- OKTMO ID: 77705000121

Rytkuchi (Russian: Рыткучи; Chukchi: Ырыткучьын, Yrytkuč'yn, lit. shooter) is a rural locality (a selo) in Chaunsky District of Chukotka Autonomous Okrug, Russia, located southwest of Pevek on the southern shores of Chaunskaya Bay. Established in 1934, its population as at 2010: 517 (2010 census); The village is a national village with the local economy dominated by reindeer husbandry. Municipally Rytkuchi is subordinated to Chaunsky Municipal District and incorporated as Rytkuchi Rural Settlement.

== History ==
The village is named after the nearby eponymous river and is translated as shooter, so called because the area was the site of a battle between Chukchi and strangers on horseback. Initially the village was established as the Chaunsky Cultural Base (Russian: Чаунская культбаза) at the mouth of the Chaun River, but it was transferred to the mouth of the Rytkuchi River in 1954. A census was first conducted in Rytkuchi in 1939, with the first kolkhoz in the village being established the following year. A year later, cultural amenities in the village were enhanced with the arrival of a dedicated teacher and the establishment of a cultural centre and a clinic. The first sovkhoz in the village was established in 1957 for the purpose of reindeer herding. Two years later, the 1959 census revealed that most of the 80 inhabitants of the village were Russian. The collective nature of the reindeer herding was reinforced by the establishment of twelve brigades in 1965, supplied with motorised transport to improve their work. In 1980 an official industry for the production of Chukchi handicrafts was established in the village, and a museum was opened in the village six years later.

== Geography ==
Rytkuchi is a maritime village on the southern shore of Chaunskaya Bay only 15 km from the Ust-Chaun wetland. The wetland is a flat, alluvial plain, consisting of a large number of small lakes, generally less than 70 cm deep, and is a delta area resulting from the confluence of the Chaun (Russian: Чаун), Palyavaam (Russian: Паляваам), Pucheveyem River (Russian: Пучувеем), Lelyuveyem (Russian: лелувеем) and Olvergyrgyvaam (Russian: Oлвеpгэргырваам) Rivers. The flat nature of the delta causes high tides to travel deep into the delta, creating salt meadows up to 10 km upstream from Rytkuchi.

== Economy ==
The economy is centred on reindeer husbandry, and Rytkuchi, along with Ayon, is the main location for reindeer husbandry in Chaunsky District. The men of the village spend most of their time out on the tundra, with many of the women and children spending up to nine months a year in the village so that the children can get an education. The village has both a high school and a pre-school. The weapons used by the herders are often late nineteenth or early twentieth century Winchester rifles traded to them in pre-Soviet times by American traders in search of furs.^{,}

== Demographics ==
The population of Rytkuchi has fluctuated slightly between the 1990s and the present day but has remained around 500. The population according to the 2010 census was 517, of whom 284 were male and 233 female. It was estimated at 494 in January 2009, a slight increase on the figure of 482 estimated in 2005 according to an environmental impact report produced for the Kupol Gold Project, a reduction from an estimate of 509 as of 2002, (of which 323 were Chukchi) but an overall increase from 493 estimated in 1993.

== Climate ==
Rytkuchi suffers from a severe Arctic climate, with a mean annual temperature of −12.8 °C, mean January temperatures of −31.4 °C and mean July temperatures of just +9.5 °C. Snow is a possibility throughout the year and the mean winter wind speed is 5–7 m/s, gusting to 20–40 m/s during strong snowstorms. Mean annual precipitation is 251 mm, and 30–40 cm of snow in places is not uncommon by the beginning of spring.

Rytkuchi has a Tundra climate (ET) because the warmest month has an average temperature between 0 °C (32 °F) and 10 °C (50 °F) according to the Köppen climate classification.

Climate data for Rytkuchi
Month	Jan	Feb	Mar	Apr	May	Jun	Jul	Aug	Sep	Oct	Nov	Dec	Year
Record high °C (°F)	−5.7 (21.7)	−1.8 (28.8)	−2.3 (27.9)	11.8 (53.2)	16.1 (61.0)	27 (81)	29.5 (85.1)	21.9 (71.4)	15 (59)	2.5 (36.5)	3 (37)	−2.8 (27.0)	29.5 (85.1)
Mean daily maximum °C (°F)	−18.8 (−1.8)	−18 (0)	−16.1 (3.0)	−10.6 (12.9)	−2.4 (27.7)	8.5 (47.3)	11.3 (52.3)	7.4 (45.3)	0.8 (33.4)	−6.7 (19.9)	−12.1 (10.2)	−15.8 (3.6)	−6 (21)
Mean daily minimum °C (°F)	−19.7 (−3.5)	−20.3 (−4.5)	−19.4 (−2.9)	−14.9 (5.2)	−5.2 (22.6)	1.9 (35.4)	4.8 (40.6)	2 (36)	−1.8 (28.8)	−8.9 (16.0)	−13.7 (7.3)	−17.3 (0.9)	−9.4 (15.1)
Record low °C (°F)	−41 (−42)	−43.6 (−46.5)	−41.9 (−43.4)	−39 (−38)	−24.5 (−12.1)	−6.9 (19.6)	−2.3 (27.9)	−7.7 (18.1)	−15.9 (3.4)	−28.1 (−18.6)	−36 (−33)	−42 (−44)	−43.6 (−46.5)
Average rainfall mm (inches)	3 (0.1)	0 (0)	0 (0)	3 (0.1)	0 (0)	3 (0.1)	6 (0.2)	9 (0.4)	6 (0.2)	3 (0.1)	0 (0)	0 (0)	33 (1.3)
Average snowy days	15	11	9	10	12	3	1	4	15	17	14	14	110

== Notable residents ==
- Klavdia Geutval, Chukchi folklorist.

== See also ==
- List of inhabited localities in Chaunsky District
