= Ervynaygytgyn =

Lake of Chukotka Autonomous Okrug

- Эрвынайгытгын / Ирвынейгытгын
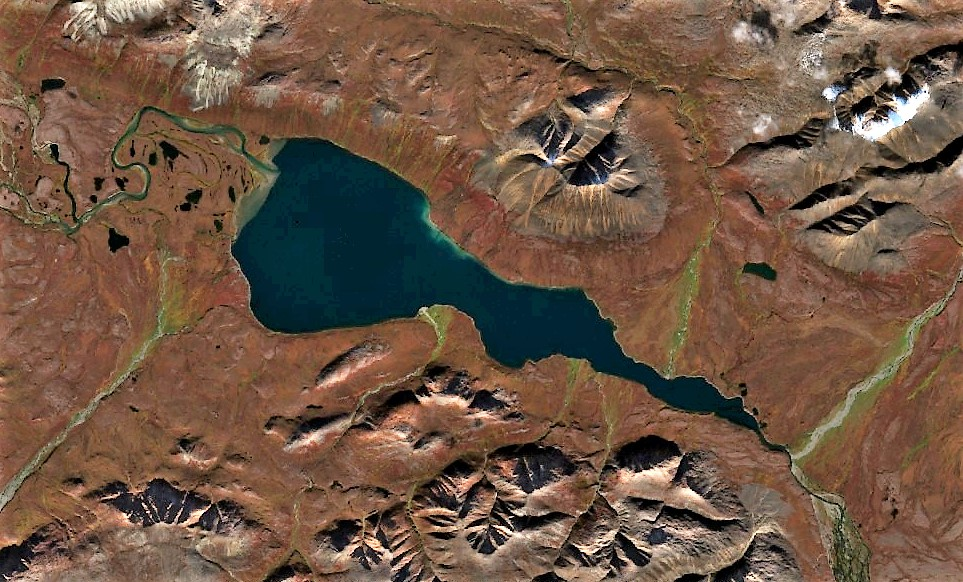
- Sentinel-2 image of the lake

- Location in Chukotka Autonomous Okrug, Russian Far East
- Location: Chukotka Autonomous Okrug
- Coordinates: 67°16′41″N 178°47′28″W
- Type: Oligotrophic
- Primary inflows: Irvyneyveem, Pytvytkovaam, Shchebenka
- Primary outflows: Irvyneyveem
- Catchment area: 792 km^{2} (306 sq mi)
- Basin countries: Russia
- Max. length: 8.3 km (5.2 mi)
- Max. width: 3.1 km (1.9 mi)
- Surface area: ca 15 km^{2} (5.8 sq mi)
- Average depth: 20 m (0.012 mi)
- Max. depth: 35 m (0.022 mi)
- Surface elevation: 317 m (1,040 ft)
- Islands: None

Ervynaygytgyn (Russian: Эрвынайгытгын; Chukot: Ирвынейгытгын) is a freshwater lake in Iultinsky District, Chukotka Autonomous Okrug, Russian Federation. It has an area of about 15 km^{2} (5.8 sq mi) (13.1 km^{2} (5.1 sq mi)).

There are no permanent settlements on the shores of the lake.

The name of the lake in Chukot means "a lake near a sharp mountain."

== Geography ==
Ervynaygytgyn is located in the Chukotka Mountains of the Chukotka Peninsula, about 30 km (19 mi) southwest of lake Ekityki and 35 km (22 mi) to the north of Yanranaygytgyn. The lake is elongated and stretches roughly from NW to SE. The western section is broad and the lake narrows towards its eastern end.

The lake lies in a swampy intermontane basin with a number of rivers flowing into it. The largest is the 106 km (66 mi) long Irvyneyveem, a tributary of the Amguema. It flows across the lake, entering it from the NW and flowing out of it from the southeastern end. Ervynaygytgyn freezes in the first half of September and stays under ice until June.

== See also ==
- List of lakes of Russia
