= Chaunsky =

Chaunsky (masculine), Chaunskaya (feminine), or Chaunskoye (neuter) may refer to:

- Chaunsky District, a district of Chukotka Autonomous Okrug, Russia
- Chaunskaya Bay, a bay in the East Siberia Sea, Russia
