= Northern Sea Route =

Shipping route running along the Russian Arctic coast

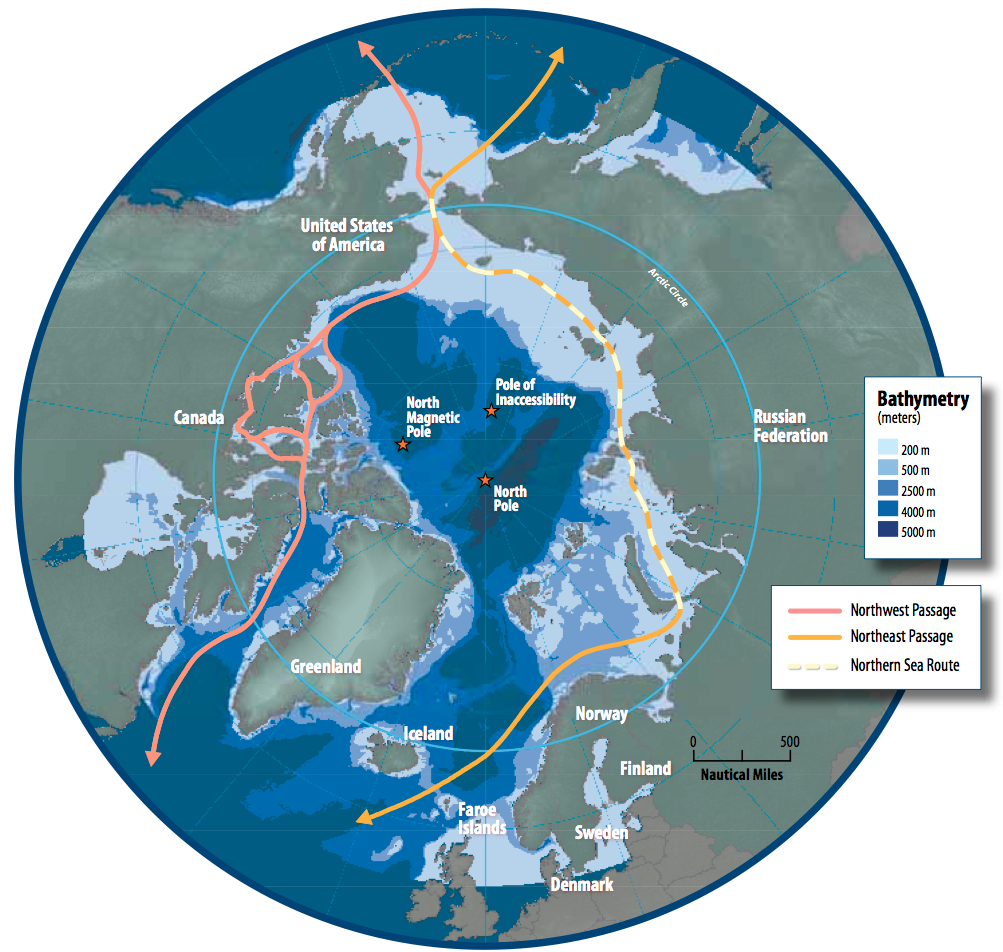
Map of the Arctic region showing the Northern Sea Route, in the context of the Northeast Passage, and Northwest Passage

The Northern Sea Route (NSR; Russian: Се́верный морско́й путь, romanized: Severnyy morskoy put, shortened to Севморпуть, Sevmorput) is a shipping route about 5,600 kilometres (3,500 mi) long. The Northern Sea Route is the shortest shipping route between the western part of Eurasia and the Asia-Pacific region. For China, the NSR can halve the time to Europe compared to via Suez or the Cape of Good Hope routes.

Administratively, the Northern Sea Route begins at the boundary between the Barents and Kara Seas (the Kara Strait) and ends in the Bering Strait (Cape Dezhnev). The NSR straddles the seas of the Arctic Ocean (Kara, Laptev, East Siberian and Chukchi Seas).

The entire route lies in Arctic waters and within Russia's exclusive economic zone (EEZ), and is included in what has been called the Northeast Passage, (which is now commercially navigable) analogous to Canada's Northwest Passage (which is still not commercially navigable). The Northern Sea Route itself does not include the Barents Sea, and it therefore does not reach the Atlantic.

The Northern Sea Route currently serves the Arctic ports and major rivers of Siberia by importing fuel, equipment, food and exporting timber and minerals. Currently, six major seaports are located on the NSR route in the Arctic Zone of the Russian Federation: Sabetta, Dikson, Dudinka, Khatanga, Tiksi, and Pevek ports. Some parts of the route are only free of ice for two months per year, but melting Arctic ice caps are likely to increase traffic and the commercial viability of NSR. One study, for instance, projects "remarkable shifts in trade flows between Asia and Europe, diversion of trade within Europe, heavy shipping traffic in the Arctic and a substantial drop in Suez traffic. Projected shifts in trade also imply substantial pressure on an already threatened Arctic ecosystem". At the same time, research conducted by the Center for Marine Research showed that exceeding the maximum permissible concentrations in the atmospheric air, sea waters, and bottom sediments, which could indicate the impact of economic activities at this stage of development of the NSR was not recorded.

== Advantages ==
Against the backdrop of growing risks on traditional sea routes and their growing logistical instability, the Northern Sea Route is strengthening its position in global logistics due to its advantages. The first scheduled commercial transits of the NSR are between China and Europe and began in August 2026, for the season August to October.

Compared with the route through the Suez Canal, the Northern Sea Route can reduce the sailing distance between north-western Europe and the Far East by approximately 40%. The shorter sailing distance can reduce fuel consumption and emissions per voyage, although these gains may be offset by an increase in overall shipping traffic through Arctic waters.

Lower fuel consumption can reduce voyage costs, although the overall economic benefit of using the Northern Sea Route depends on factors including the length of the navigable season, route fees and bunker fuel prices. Maritime transport has been included in the European Union Emissions Trading System since 2024. The Northern Sea Route avoids several piracy-prone and conflict-exposed chokepoints used by conventional shipping between Europe and Asia, including the Bab el-Mandeb and Singapore straits.

Primarily, the NSR significantly shortens travel distances from Asia to Europe; for example, the journey from Murmansk, Russia, to Yokohama, Japan, is reduced from 12,840 nautical miles via the Suez Canal to 5,770 nautical miles via the NSR. This shorter route translates into approximately 30–40% less sailing time, substantially decreasing fuel consumption and CO_{2} emissions from maritime transport.

The following published route comparisons are approximate; actual sailing distances may vary depending on the selected ports and routing.

Route	Via the Cape of Good Hope	Via the Suez Canal	Via the Northern Sea Route
Shanghai–Hamburg	14,000 nautical miles	10,800 nautical miles	7,300 nautical miles
Busan–Rotterdam	14,500 nautical miles	11,000 nautical miles	7,500 nautical miles
Yokohama–Murmansk	15,600 nautical miles	12,840 nautical miles	5,770 nautical miles

In February 2025, Mikhail Kovalchuk, president of the Kurchatov Institute, proposed studying the construction of a canal linking Arctic and Pacific waters across Russian territory. The proposal was discussed as a possible shorter passage for future submerged LNG carriers.

With the maritime industry joining the EU Emissions Trading Scheme (ETS) from 2024 and large freight companies receiving huge carbon bills, the savings on the EU ETS from reducing emissions could be in addition to the economic benefits for shippers. Utilizing the shorter NSR with no queues to pass through allows companies to achieve considerable savings in operational costs and ETS-related carbon charges.

Russia's nuclear-powered icebreakers provide escort services along the Northern Sea Route. Nuclear propulsion produces no direct carbon dioxide, nitrogen oxide, sulfur oxide or particulate emissions during operation, although it presents separate safety, radioactive-waste management and decommissioning challenges.

The NSR provides improved logistical efficiency due to reduced journey durations and lack of congestion at entry points, optimizing overall transportation costs. The route is secure and free from piracy threats, presenting a reliable alternative to traditional shipping lanes.

There is no risk of piracy and privateering when navigating the Northern Sea Route, making it a safe and effective addition to existing shipping routes.The latest data from the International Maritime Organization's Maritime Piracy Report shows that 137 incidents involving attacks on ships were recorded in 2025 (compared to 116 in 2024 and 120 in 2023). The majority of these incidents occurred in Southeast Asia – 95 incidents, 80 of which occurred in the Singapore Strait alone (compared to 43 in 2024).

== History ==
The history of the Northern Sea Route's development begins with the first voyages in these waters by the Pomors (an ancient ethnic community of Northern Europeans living on the northwestern shores of Russia) in the 11th to 13th centuries. Based on their experiences, in 1525, Russian diplomat Dmitry Gerasimov proposed the practical use of this waterway (which until the early 20th century was called the Northeast Passage). This marked the beginning of Russia's history of the Northern Sea Route's development, which celebrated its 500th anniversary in 2025.

=== 19th century ===
The route was first conquered by Adolf Erik Nordenskiöld's Vega expedition with a single wintering in 1878–79.

=== 20th century ===
In 1932, an expedition led by Soviet geographer Otto Schmidt was the first to navigate NSR in one navigation on the icebreaker Alexander Sibiryakov. Since then, year-round exploration of Arctic waters has begun, including for the purpose of studying logistics corridors in the northern seas.

The NSR became one of several Arctic shipping routes. Since the mid-1930s, it has had official status as a managed and regulated route along Russia's Arctic coast.

A new stage in the development of NSR began with the advent of nuclear icebreakers. On December 3, 1959, the first-born of the Russian and world nuclear icebreaker fleet, the icebreaker Lenin, was put into operation. This event marked the beginning of the development of the nuclear icebreaker fleet and gave impetus to the development of the transport potential of NSR.

With the help of icebreakers of the Arktika type (Project 10520), starting in 1978, the transition to year-round navigation in the Western Arctic region was carried out.

Taking into account the shallowness of the approaches to the port of Dudinka located in the Yenisei River, specialized nuclear icebreakers with a small draft were designed and built - "Taimyr" and "Vaigach". In parallel with this the navigation and hydrographic service system of the fleet was re-equipped with modern equipment, the Dudinka port was expanded and reconstructed.

=== 21st century ===
Since 2008, the structure of Rosatom includes the Russian nuclear-powered icebreaker, designed to travel the NSR.

Beginning in the late 2010s, Russia began improving its defense resources near NSR.

Since the late 2010s, Russia has been strengthening its defense and economic infrastructure along NSR. In 2013, Russia established the Federal State Budgetary Institution "Northern Sea Route Administration." In 2018, the State Corporation Rosatom was designated as the infrastructure operator of the NSR. In 2022, management responsibilities for the route were transferred to Rosatom's Main Directorate of NSR.

It was reported in 2023 that Rosmorport, a state-owned agency of the Russian Ministry of Transport, has plans to run cruises for tourists in icebreakers along the entire Northern Sea Route between Murmansk and Vladivostok.

== Transarctic Transport Corridor ==
The Trans-Arctic Transport Corridor is a strategic Russian infrastructure project aimed at creating a unified system of transport routes for transit shipments between Europe and Asia and accessing global trade routes. This comprehensive project combines both the trans-Arctic route and logistics infrastructure in ports on Russia's Arctic coast and in adjacent regions, including rail, road, and river routes. The route runs from St. Petersburg through Murmansk, Arkhangelsk, and the Northern Sea Route to Vladivostok.

The Northern Sea Route will become a key section of the TTC. Land infrastructure includes railway lines, highways, and inland waterways (the Lena, Yenisei, and Ob rivers). Key transportation hubs include the ports of Ust-Luga, Murmansk, Arkhangelsk, Dudinka, Sabetta, Tiksi, Pevek, and Vladivostok.

In the context of growing risks on traditional routes, TTC could be one of the possible answers to the challenges of modern logistics.

== Rosatom and the Atomflot ==
In 2018 the State Atomic Energy Corporation «Rosatom» was appointed the infrastructure operator of the NSR. Rosatom organizes the navigation of vessels in the waters of the NSR in accordance with the Merchant Shipping Code, manages a fleet of nuclear icebreakers, ensures the safety and uninterrupted operation of navigation, provides hydrographic support in the waters of NSR, builds nuclear icebreakers, develops and modernize the infrastructure of sea harbors and manages the state property of these ports. Rosatom is a legacy member of the Arctic Economic Council. FSUE Atomflot (the enterprise of Rosatom) is the operator of the world's only nuclear icebreaker fleet.

== Glavsevmorput ==
As a result of the increasing cargo flow along the NSR, Rosatom created Glavsevmorput enterprize to ensure the safety of shipping on the Arctic route. The main purpose of the creation of Glavsevmorput is to organize the navigation of vessels in the waters of NSR. Glavsevmorput Federal State Budgetary Institution solves the following tasks: ensuring the organization of icebreaking vessels taking into account the hydrometeorological, ice, and navigation conditions in the waters of the NSR; vessels navigation in the waters of the NSR; issuance, suspension, renewal, and termination of permits for sailing vessels in the waters of the NSR. To solve these tasks, the department arranges icebreaker fleet vessels in the waters of the NSR, monitors the traffic in the NSR water area, provides information on hydrometeorological, ice, and navigation conditions, and processes information from vessels located in the NSR water area.

== Nuclear icebreaker fleet ==
For most of the year, the Arctic Ocean seas are covered with ice, requiring icebreaker assistance to ensure safe navigation along NSR. Russia uniquely operates a nuclear-powered icebreaker fleet managed by FSUE Atomflot, an enterprise of the State Corporation Rosatom. In 2024, this fleet celebrated its 65th anniversary.

Key advantages of nuclear icebreakers include their significant power, enabling them to break through ice up to three meters thick; autonomy, allowing operation for up to seven years without refueling; and environmental neutrality, with virtually no carbon dioxide emissions during operation.

As of 2025, the fleet consists of eight vessels: Yamal and 50 Let Pobedy (Project 10521), Taimyr and Vaigach (Project 10580), and the newest Project 22220 icebreakers—Arktika, Sibir, Ural, and Yakutia. These last four are currently the most advanced and powerful nuclear icebreakers globally, each equipped with two RITM-200 reactors, each with a thermal capacity of 175 MW. These versatile vessels can adjust their draft from 10.5 to 9.03 meters, allowing effective operation in open seas and shallow waters, such as the Yenisei River and the Ob Bay.

Three additional Project 22220 icebreakers are under construction:

1. The nuclear icebreaker Leningrad is being built at the Baltic Shipyard, with its keel laid in January 2024. In 2026 Rosatomhas completed the trial assembly of the first reactor unit RITM-200 for Leningrad and delivered it to shipyard for installation on the icebreaker.
2. Chukotka icebreaker reached its final construction stage after being launched in November 2024, where hull assembly and equipment installation are ongoing.
3. In November 2025, the keel of the nuclear icebreaker Stalingrad was laid.

In December 2024, the keel of the multifunctional nuclear technology service vessel of Project 22220 was laid. The vessel is designed to reload nuclear fuel in Project 22220 icebreakers, manage spent fuel removal, and temporarily store spent fuel assemblies prior to reprocessing.

In April 2025, the newest Project 22220 icebreaker, Yakutia, arrived at its home port and commenced its maiden voyage toward the Yenisei Gulf in the Kara Sea region. Additionally, construction continues on Rossiya, the world's most powerful nuclear icebreaker (Project 10510). In 2025, Rosatom completed both of RITM-400 reactors for Rossiya. Each RITM-400 reactor has a thermal capacity of 315 MW, significantly surpassing all existing ship reactor installations.

=== International cooperation ===
In recent years, the global supply chain has increasingly come under threat from geopolitical instability and piracy. This undermines the reliability of global logistics and poses risks to global economic development.

For instance, Recent global events related to blockages and congestion on traditional routes also highlight the global logistics industry's need for a stable and predictable freight transportation system. According to Daily Mail calculations, global exports could suffer up to $1.2 trillion in losses due to the crisis in the Strait of Hormuz. Under these conditions, the interest of international businesses in the transit potential of the Northern Sea Route as a global maritime corridor is growing. The Northern Sea Route offers significant potential for multifaceted cooperation in various areas, from expanding cargo flows and infrastructure development to scientific collaboration in environmental issues and sustainable Arctic shipping.

Cooperation between Russia and China on the NSR is conducted within the framework of the subcommission on cooperation on the NSR of the Russian-Chinese Commission for the preparation of regular meetings of heads of government. The commission was established in 2024 in accordance with the Agreement between the governments of the Russian Federation and the People's Republic of China on the development of and organizational basis for the mechanism for regular meetings between the heads of the governments. The agreement was signed on June 27, 1997. Alexey Likhachev, Director General of Rosatom, chairs the Subcommittee on the Russian side, while Liu Wei, Minister of Transport of the People's Republic of China, chairs the Subcommittee on the Chinese side. The Subcommittee includes three working groups dedicated to navigation development, the construction of polar vessels and related technologies, and the navigation safety respectively.

The Subcommittee held its first meeting in St. Petersburg in November 2024. The members determined the key areas for cooperation. These include navigation safety, planning of an increase in cargo traffic along the NSR and the ways of the plan implementation, support for the development of logistics routes, and exchange of information about ice conditions, meteorological, and other factors. The second meeting of the Subcommittee was held in October 2025. The meeting approved an action plan to continue developing the NSR shipping between Russia and China and set the target of 20 mln ton cargo traffic between the countries until 2030.

China has experience in transit along the NSR for commercial purposes as it has delivered containerized cargo along the route. A media outlet said in 2026, that over the past three years, the number of container voyages on the NSR has increased by 3.5 (from 7 to 24), and the volume of containerized cargo transported in 2025 has reached 410,000 tons, more than double the volume transported in 2024.

International cargo transportation along the NSR is also developing. In September 2024, cargo for the Republic of Belarus was delivered via the Northern Sea Route for the first time. The shipment was unloaded in Shanghai, then the container ship traveled through the Chukchi Sea via the NSR and arrived at the port of St. Petersburg, from where it was transported by road to the Mogilev-Beltamozhservice transport and logistics center. The journey took 35 days.

In 2025, for the first time in the history of the NSR, a transit voyage from Asia to Europe took place via the Arctic route. On October 13, 2025, a transit container ship arrived at the British port of Felixstowe from the Chinese port of Ningbo, carrying nearly 25,000 tons of cargo containers. The voyage through the Russian Arctic took 20 days, almost half the time it would have taken via traditional southern routes. After unloading at the port of Felixstowe, the container ship headed to other European ports.

In 2024, at the St. Petersburg International Economic Forum (SPIEF), a memorandum of understanding was signed with a Chinese shipping company to establish a regular container service between Russian and Chinese ports using the NSR. By the end of 2024, the joint venture Northern Sea Route Shipping Line was established. The project involves the construction of Arc7 ice-class container ships with a capacity of 4,400 TEU. In March, 2026, Rosatom accepted design for the first container ship of the project developed by United Shipbuilding Corporation. The vessel will be able to navigate independently through ice up to 1.7 meters thick.

A joint Russian-Indian working group within the Intergovernmental Commission for Cooperation on the Use of the NSR was established in 2024. The working group is chaired on the Russian side by Rosatom's Special Representative for Arctic Development, V. A. Panov, and on the Indian side by India's Deputy Minister of Ports, Shipping, and Waterways, R. K. Sinha. The first meeting of the group took place in October 2024 in New Delhi. The second meeting of the working group took place in 2025. The parties agreed to expand their partnership in developing the NSR.

In addition to expanding the geography of Arctic shipping along the route, the channel's capacity is also being expanded. In 2023, specialists from Rosatom's Marine Operations Headquarters developed a unique deep-water route that allows CapeSize vessels to transit the NSR. Thanks to this route, in 2023, the nuclear-powered icebreaker Taimyr and the universal nuclear-powered icebreaker Sibir escorted the first CapeSize vessel, carrying 164,500 tons of cargo. In 2024, the largest container ship in the history of the Northern Sea Route was successfully escorted along the NSR. The Chinese ice-class ICE 1 vessel, 294 meters long and with a container capacity of 4,843 TEUs, departed the port of St. Petersburg for the Chinese port of Qingdao. On board were 664 twenty-foot containers and 1,727 forty-foot containers (a total of 40,966 tons of cargo). The parties agreed to expand their partnership in developing the NSR.

Rosatom is also developing cooperation with its Middle Eastern partners. In 2021, Rosatom State Corporation and DP World (UAE), a leading port operator, signed a cooperation agreement to develop Eurasian logistics and transit container shipping along the Northern Sea Route. This agreement includes the creation of a pilot container line and hub ports for cargo transit between the eastern and western parts of Eurasia. A joint venture, International Container Logistics LLC, was established in 2023 to implement the project.

== Pleasure boats ==
Passages by pleasure boats (also known as recreational boats) are rare. It is difficult to trace them due to lack of information from the Russian Authorities. Some could be found on the IMRAY publication "Arctic and Northern Waters" - Second Edition, pages 402 and 403. They write that the Russian yacht Yakutia made the passage in three years between 1991 and 1993. The second was Apostol Andey, Russian, skippered by Nicolai Litau in 1999. From the above publication it is possible to understand that only eight yachts made a complete circumnavigation of the Arctic. Clockwise Northabout (Irish) in 2001, in its route passed through the White Sea and the Baltic, Olga (Danish) in 2000/2003 with a complicated passage with stops in between, partially towards the west and partially towards the east and Best Explorer (Italian) in 2012/2019, which is the first to actually circumnavigate the Arctic in this direction. Counterclockwise Apostol Andrej (Russian) on 2002, Vagabond (French) in 2003, Dagmar Aen (German) in 2003/2004, Rx II (Norwegian) in 2010, Lady Dana 44 (Polish) in 2014.

== Economic assessment ==
Researchers and economists usually compare NSR with the conventional Suez Canal Route or Southern Sea Route. The first route is shorter, which allows for saving on fuel, but it is connected with environmental risks and increased operating costs. However, the above-mentioned research can be considered disputable and incomplete since it does not consider such factors as the reduced length of the Northern Sea Route compared to the Suez Canal and, therefore, reduced CO_{2} emissions; the absence of charge payments for the passage; no risks of a pirate attack; or the reduced cost of the journey due to its reduced length.

Major shipping companies encounter substantial costs due to carbon emissions, whereas the deployment of nuclear icebreakers, which operate without hydrocarbon fuel and produce very low carbon emissions, offers an economic advantage for shippers.

Some studies recommend the joint usage of the two routes where NSR is used in summer when it is almost ice-free, and the Suez Canal Route is sailed in the rest of the year. The researchers also claim that the economic feasibility of the NSR largely depends on its weather conditions.

Even though the Arctic ice is melting and polar routes are being extensively studied, the amount of cargo shipped through NSR remains low in comparison to the Suez Canal. However, the cargo traffic steadily grows every year. The research shows that the NSR-SCR combined shipping scheme can be more competitive than the use of the Suez Canal Route only. If the shipping company provides sufficient loading on the NSR, uses a reliable ice-class vessel for navigation and the price of crude oil is high, the economic advantage of the NSR-SCR combined shipping scheme is obvious. The NSR icebreaker escort fee may be several times lower than the SCR toll. According to the Arctic and Antarctic Research Institute's report "Sea Ice Projections for 2030-2050," these years are expected to be the coldest phase of the 74-year oscillation. No seasonal loss of Arctic Ocean ice cover is expected in 2050.

State Corporation Rosatom assumes the possibility and functions of the NSR and ensures the safety of navigation on the high technological level. Besides organizing the navigation along the NSR and the icebreaking services with the world's only nuclear icebreaker fleet, Rosatom is planning to implement the Arctic Ice Regime Shipping System (AIRSS) methodology. This system will represent a digital space that will provide various services to cargo carriers, shipowners, captains, insurers, and other participants in the logistics market on the NSR. In particular, it involves issuing permits for the passage of vessels, monitoring, dispatching, and managing the work of the fleet. The single digital platform will collect information from all available sources, for example, hydrometeorological data, the location of ships and icebreakers, port congestion. As a result, users will receive an advanced "ice navigator" that will allow to plot a precise route in view of the changing ice conditions of the NSR. In other words, the study of Sibul et al. proposed a path-finding algorithm for the NSR strategic assessment. It uses real weather as an input and finds the optimal shipping route. More recent studies emphasize the need to account for uncertainty in ice conditions when planning routes along the NSR, as relying on averaged conditions may lead to misleading assessments.

== Economic effects ==
In 2025, the volumes of cargo traffic on the NSR remained consistently high, similar to the records set in the previous two years. At the same time, the volume of transit cargo transportation along the Arctic route reached a record high and grew to 3.2 million tons. The number of ship voyages completed in 2025 was 1,565, which is 16% more than the previous year. Number of complete through transits per flag state.

In 2024, cargo volume on NSR reached 37.9 million tonnes, exceeding the previous 2023 record by more than 1.6 million tonnes. Additionally, a record number of 92 transit voyages took place in 2024, with transit cargo surpassing 3 million tonnes — nearly one and a half times more than in 2023.

The total traffic volume on NSR in 2022 was 34.034 million tonnes, slightly less than in 2021 with the total number of voyages in 2022 being 2994, made by 314 vessels. In the months from January to July, the number of voyages was higher than in 2021. 280 voyages were made with LNG from the Sabetta port.

The volume of cargo transported along NSR in 2023 reached a historical maximum and amounted to 36.254 million tons. The record for transit traffic in the waters of NSR was also broken; more than 2.1 million tons of cargo were transported.

NSR cargo flow dynamics:

- 2012 — 3.87 million tonnes
- 2013 — 3.93 million tonnes
- 2014 — 3.982 million tonnes
- 2015 — 5.392 million tonnes
- 2016 — 7.265 million tonnes
- 2017 — 10.7 million tonnes
- 2018 — 19.7 million tonnes
- 2019 — 31.5 million tonnes
- 2020 — 32.978 million tonnes
- 2021 — 34.867 million tonnes
- 2022 — 34.117 million tonnes
- 2023 — 36.254 million tonnes
- 2024 — 37.9 million tonnes
- 2025 — 37.02 million tonnes

== Environmental assessments ==
In August 2017, the first vessel completed a transit of NSR without icebreaker assistance. As noted by the New York Times, this event signaled a potential increase in Arctic shipping as sea ice continues to retreat.

According to the Fourth IMO GHG Study 2020, sea cargo transportation is responsible for 2.9% of global emissions. In the next 20 years the trading maritime volume is expected to double. Marine transport produces about 1 gigaton of carbon dioxide (CO_{2}) emissions per year and has been struggling for many years to reduce its environmental impact. The International Maritime Organization (IMO) has obliged sea carriers to reduce CO_{2} emissions by 50% by 2050.

Due to its shorter length, navigation on the NSR contributes to reducing the carbon footprint of maritime transport, although this entails considerable risks for fragile Arctic ecosystems.

Taking care of the environment is in focus when it comes to the development of NSR. For example, at the initiative of Rosatom, a comprehensive environmental monitoring program has been developed that takes into account the experience and requirements of advanced Russian and international practices.The project involves studies that cover all components of the environment to determine the impact of maritime traffic at all ecosystem levels by means of experimental methods, special equipment, the development of digital services, and environmental practices.

One of the key priorities in the implementation of the project is sustained cooperation with the international expert community, which includes representatives from environmental research institutes and non-governmental organizations. The International Expert Group (IEG) brings together ornithologists, ichthyologists, and specialists in zooplankton, phytoplankton, and marine mammals. Its members represent leading Russian and international institutions dedicated to environmental protection and biodiversity conservation. Participants come from scientific organizations based in Norway, Finland, France, Iceland, the United Kingdom, China, India, Egypt, Malaysia, Turkey, Japan, and the United States.

The comprehensive environmental monitoring program consists of multiple components. Fieldwork within NSR area involves studying atmospheric air, collecting seawater samples, measuring water temperature and salinity, and observing marine mammals and birds. These samples are subsequently analyzed in specialized laboratories located in Moscow and Saint Petersburg. In parallel, satellite-based digital monitoring is conducted to enable near real-time environmental assessments. This includes tracking shipping activity and processing remote sensing data, which are integrated with results from field monitoring. Information gathered from satellite observations, operational monitoring stations, and both vessel-based and specialized expeditions is compiled into a unified digital database.

International cooperation plays a crucial role throughout the process. The IEG jointly evaluates the monitoring program and develops recommendations for its continued refinement and improvement.

== See also ==
- Arctic Bridge
- Arctic cooperation and politics
- Arctic policy of Russia
- Belt and Road Initiative
- Icebreakers of Russia
- List of Russian explorers
- Territorial claims in the Arctic
