= Klavdia Geutval =

Chukchi folklorist (1930–2001)

- Клавдия Геутваль
- Born: 10 April 1930; Ustchaun, Russian SSR, Soviet Union
- Died: August 31, 2001 (aged 71); Rytkuchi, Chukotka Autonomous Okrug, Russia
- Occupation: Chukchi folklorist
- Political party: Communist Party of the Soviet Union

Klavdia Ivanovna Geutval (Russian: Клавдия Ивановна Геутваль; 10 April 1930 – 31 August 2001) was a Chukchi folklorist and poet. Following a career working for the Communist Party of the Soviet Union in Chukotka, she went on to contribute to the preservation of Chukchi culture, for which she was named an Honoured Cultural Worker of the RSFSR.

== Biography ==
Geutval was born on 10 April 1930 in a camp in Ustchaun (now Rytkuchi), the ninth child born to Chukchi parents. She grew up in the tundra near the mouth of the Chaun, helping her family herd reindeer. In 1940, Geutval started attending school in Cape Shelagskiy, where she excelled academically and became one of the first Young Pioneers in the area. In 1941, her father Ettykai died, and Geutval was sent to a boarding school in Pevek. While at school, she helped sew clothes for Red Army soldiers during World War II. Geutval graduated from high school in 1948.

In 1952, Geutval became a member of the Communist Party of the Soviet Union. After completing a two-year party course in Anadyr, she returned to Chaunsky District, where she led its local party committee's women's department between 1952 and 1958. During her time in Pevek, she met and married Pyotr Vukvutagin. Geutval went on to serve as party secretary of Ustchaun Village Council between 1963 and 1970. During this time, she also worked as a methodologist for the local agricultural brigade, supporting reindeer herders in and around Ustchaun.

Following the end of her party career in 1970, Geutval began to focus on the preservation of Chukchi customs and traditions. She began writing and composing songs and poems in Chukchi, which she performed around Chukotka. By 1977, Geutval had collated a considerable collection of Chukchi cultural materials, which she donated to Russian ethnographer Ilya Gurvich. Geutval placed an important role in the establishment of the Pevek Ethnographic Museum in Pevek. She was named an Honoured Cultural Worker of the RSFSR and an Honorary Citizen of the Chutkotka Autonomous Okrug in response to her work on the preservation of Chukchi culture.

In 1974, Geutval founded the Chukchi musical ensemble Yyn'ettet (lit. 'Northern Lights'), based in Rytkuchi. The group restored and performed ancient Chukchi songs and dances, and also created its own modern performances based on Chukchi traditions. Yyn'ettet performed regularly around Chaunsky District and Anadyrsky District. Geutval served as its artistic director until 1980.

In 1978, Mosfilm asked Geutval to act as a cultural consultant on the film Territory, which was set in Chukotka; she also had a small role in the film performing a Chukchi song. In 1982, Geutval worked on the television film Velnyy shaman to advise on its depiction of Chukchi culture and language.

In 1982, Geutval published a volume of poetry in Chukchi, entitled Na severe dalnem; this was followed by another collection, Pesni tundry, and the novel Punochka. Punochka was later translated into Russian by Vladimir Pershin.

By the 1990s, it was reported that Geutval was living in relative poverty in Chukotka. She supported the Japanese linguist Tokusu Kurebito with his study of Chukchi. Geutval arranged annual yarangas to educate people about Chukchi culture.

Geutval died on 31 August 2001 in Rytkuchi. On 9 March 2009, a memorial plaque was installed for her at 12 Mira Street, where she had lived. Yny'ettet continues to perform regionally.
