= Ichvuveyem =

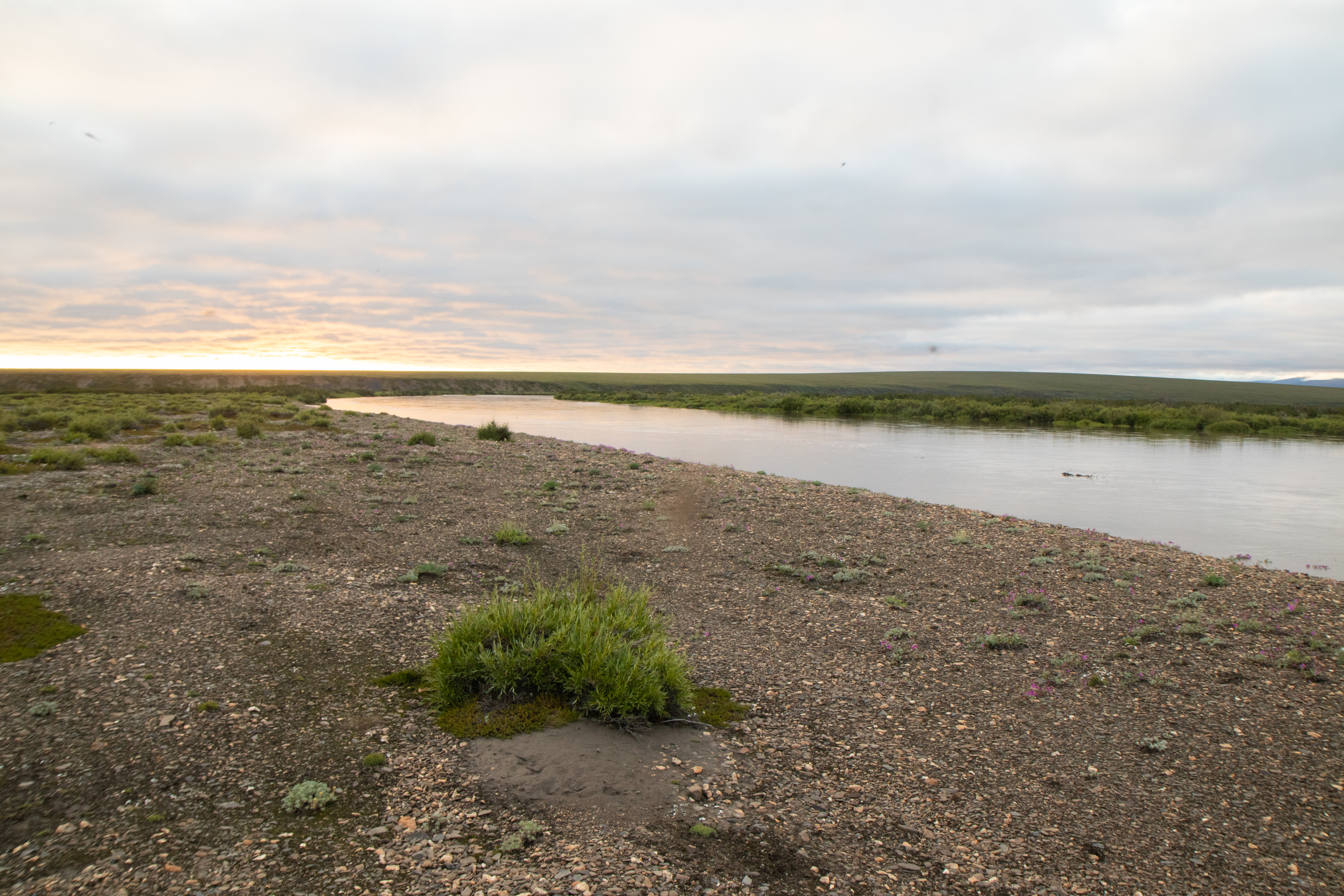

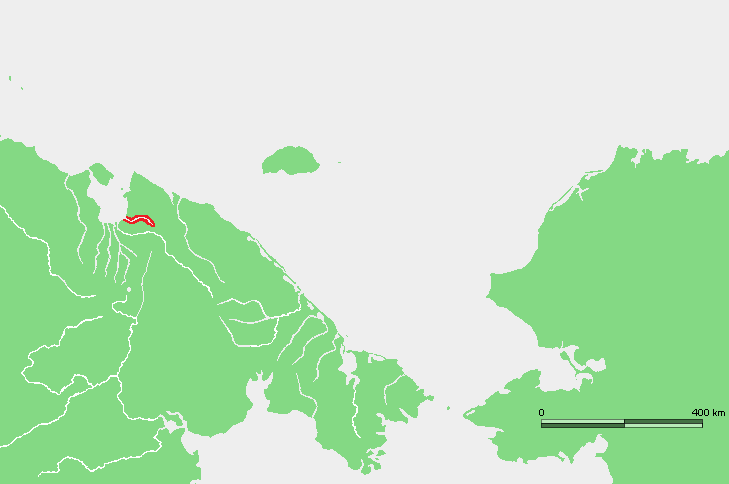
- Location of the Ichvuveyem course

Location
- Country: Russia

Physical characteristics
- Mouth: East Siberian Sea
  - coordinates: 69°02′47″N 171°00′39″E
- Length: 154 km (96 mi)
- Basin size: 2,960 km^{2} (1,140 sq mi)

The Ichvuveyem (Russian: Ичвувеем, also: Ичувеем Ichuveyem) is a stream in Far East Siberia flowing in a roughly westward direction. Its valley marks the southern limit of the Shelag Range. The Ichvuveyem is 154 kilometres (96 mi) long, and has a drainage basin of 2,960 square kilometres (1,140 sq mi). It passes through the sparsely populated areas of the Siberian tundra and flows into the East Siberian Sea at the Chaunskaya Bay. Its mouth is in a low, marshy area to the NE of the mouth of the Chaun.

The Ichvuveyem and its basin belong to the Chukotka Autonomous Okrug administrative region of Russia.
