= Chantalvergyrgyn =

Chantalvergyrgyn Чантальвэгыргын / Чантальвээргын
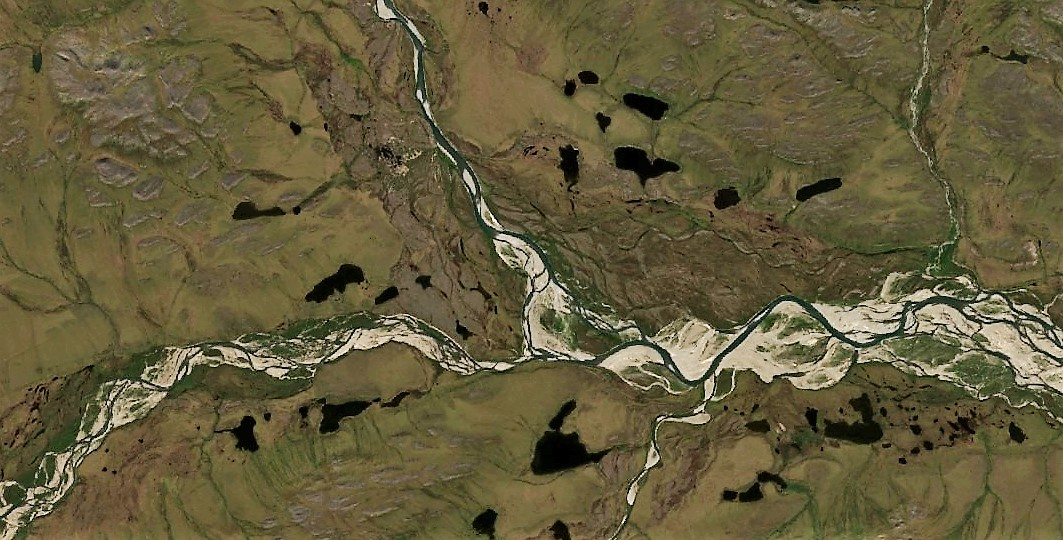
- Sentinel-2 image of the confluence of the Chantalvergyrgyn and the Ekityki

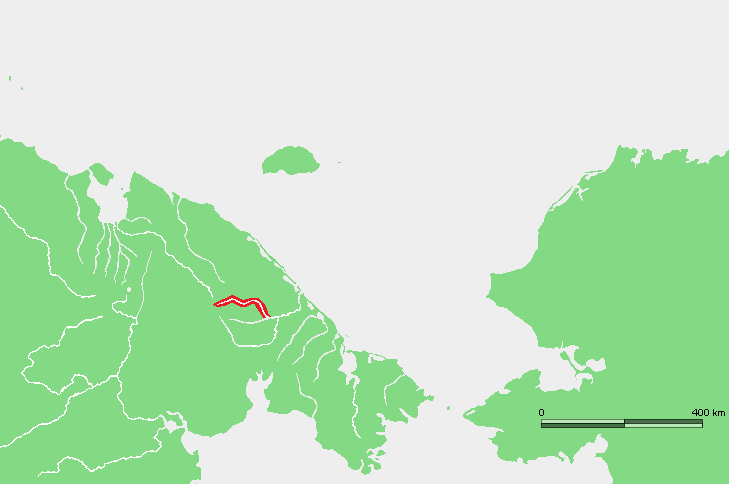
- Location of the Chantalvergyrgyn course

Location
- Country: Russia

Physical characteristics
- Source
  - elevation: 1,127 m (3,698 ft)
- Mouth: Ekityki
  - coordinates: 67°39′27″N 179°21′53″W
  - elevation: 119 m (390 ft)
- Length: 222 km (138 mi)
- Basin size: 6,620 km^{2} (2,560 sq mi)

Basin features
- Progression: Ekityki→ Amguema→ East Siberian Sea

The Chantalvergyrgyn (Russian: Чантальвэргыргын), also called the Chantalveergyn, is a stream located in Chukotka Autonomous Okrug, Russian Far East. It is 222 kilometres (138 mi) long, and has a drainage basin of 6,620 square kilometres (2,560 sq mi).

The name of the river in Chukot means “crossing the path to the Chaunts."

== Geography ==
The Chantalvergyrgyn flows roughly northeastwards in its upper course, limiting the western side of the Chantal Range of the Chukotka Mountains, just south of Iskhodnaya. Its source is very close to the Arctic Circle. Further down its course it bends and heads eastwards into the Ekityki from its left side.

The river passes through sparsely populated areas. Winters in its area are long and bitter. The river surface remains frozen for over eight months. It usually freezes in Early October and stays under ice until June.

== Fauna ==
Salmon, whitefish, vendace, grayling, rainbow herring, pike, burbot, bull trout, and loach are common in the Chantalvergyrgyn waters.
