= Yanranaygytgyn =

Lake of Chukotka Autonomous Okrug

- Янранайгытгын
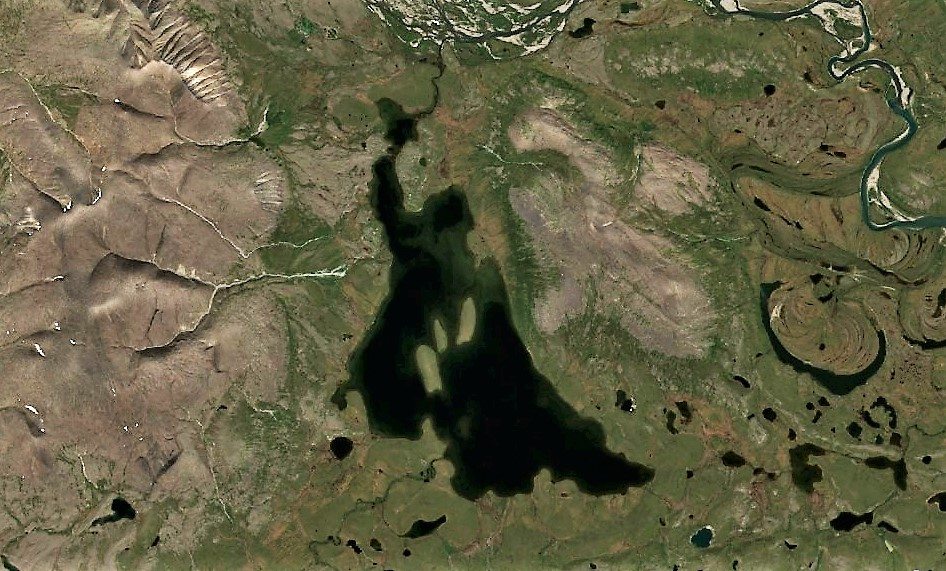
- Sentinel-2 image of the lake in July

- Location in Chukotka Autonomous Okrug, Russian Far East
- Location: Chukotka Autonomous Okrug
- Coordinates: 67°57′15″N 178°18′37″W
- Type: Oligotrophic
- Primary outflows: Unnamed
- Catchment area: 75.9 km^{2} (29.3 sq mi)
- Basin countries: Russia
- Max. length: 6.2 km (3.9 mi)
- Max. width: 2.6 km (1.6 mi)
- Surface area: ca 10.6 km^{2} (4.1 sq mi)
- Surface elevation: 304 m (997 ft)
- Islands: 3

Yanranaygytgyn (Russian: Янранайгытгын; Chukot: Янранайгытгын) is a freshwater lake in Iultinsky District, Chukotka Autonomous Okrug, Russian Federation. It has an area of 10.6 km^{2} (4.1 sq mi) and a catchment area of 75.9 km^{2} (29.3 sq mi).

There are no permanent settlements on the shores of the lake.

The name of the lake in Chukot means "a lake near a separate mountain."

== Geography ==
Yanranaygytgyn is located in the Chukotka Mountains, 35 km (22 mi) to the south of Ervynaygytgyn. The lake has a roughly triangular shape and there are three islands in the middle. The southern shore is indented and the lake narrows towards its northern end.

Yanranaygytgyn lies in an area of lakes at the northern edge of the Amguema Valley. It is the largest of the cluster, together with lake Kontalyagytgyn that lies 5 km (3.1 mi) to the southwest. An unnamed river, a small tributary of the Amguema, flows out of the lake from the northern end. Yanranaygytgyn freezes in mid-September and stays under ice until June.

== Flora and fauna ==
Yanranaygytgyn is surrounded by tundra. Arctic char is common in the waters of the lake.

== See also ==
- List of lakes of Russia
