= Ekityki (lake) =

Lake in Russia

- Озеро Экитыки (Russian)
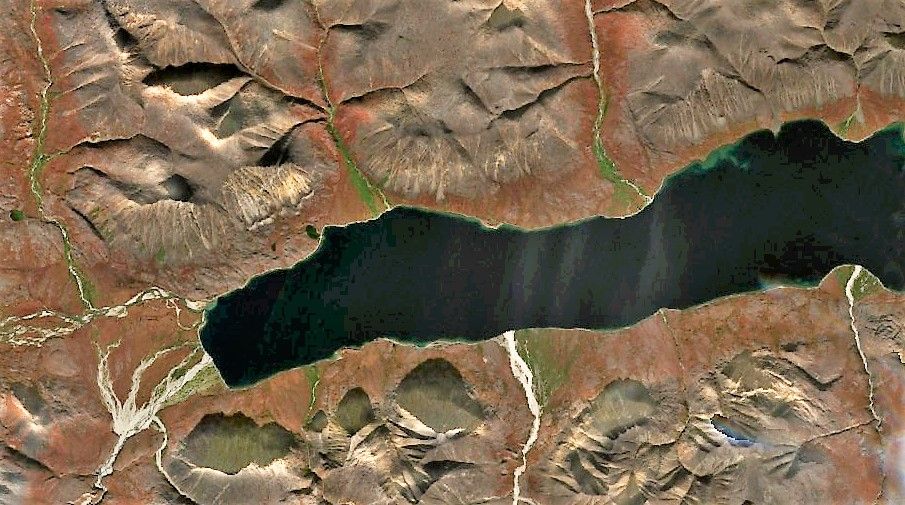
- Western part of Ekityki lake Sentinel-2 image

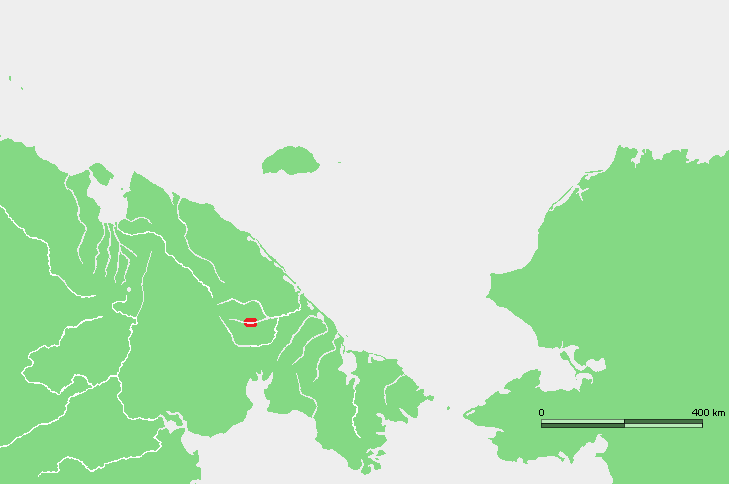
- Location of the lake

- Location within Chukotka Autonomous Okrug
- Location: Chukotka
- Coordinates: 67°31′N 179°33′W
- Primary inflows: Ekityki River
- Primary outflows: Ekityki River
- Basin countries: Russia
- Max. length: 21 kilometres (13 mi)
- Max. width: 2.5 kilometres (1.6 mi)

Lake Ekityki (Russian: Экитыки) is a lake in Iultinsky District, Chukotka Autonomous Okrug, Russian Federation.

== Geography ==
The lake lies in the Chukotka Mountains, in the Siberian Far East. The Ekityki River flows through and it belongs to its basin.

The shape of the Ekityki Lake is long and narrow. It is oriented from east to west and is 21 kilometres (13 mi) long with an average width of 2 kilometres (1.2 mi). The Ekityk Range stretches above the northern shore. Like all lakes of the tundra, it is frozen for the greatest part of the year. Lake Ervynaygytgyn lies about 30 km (19 mi) to the southwest.

== Fauna ==
Lake Ekityki is the only location in the whole Eurasian continent where the Pygmy whitefish is found.

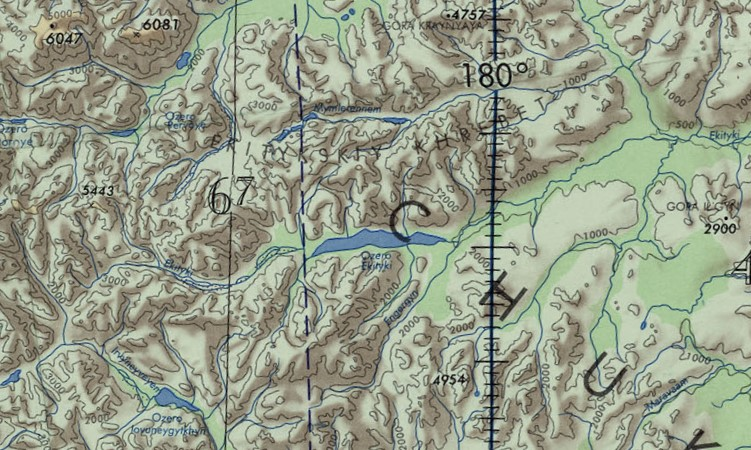
Defense Mapping Agency topographical map section.

== See also ==
- List of lakes of Russia
