= Shelag Range =

Mountains in far north-eastern Russia

- Шелагский хребет
- Location within Chukotka Autonomous Okrug

Highest point
- Peak: Medvezhy Logovo
- Elevation: 1,105 m (3,625 ft)
- Listing: Mountains and hills of Russia
- Coordinates: 69°51′31″N 171°16′34″E

Dimensions
- Length: 120 km (75 mi) WNW/ESE

Geography
- Location: Chukotka Autonomous Okrug, Far Eastern Federal District
- Range coordinates: 69°45′N 171°30′E
- Parent range: Chukotka Mountains; East Siberian System

Geology
- Orogeny: Alpine orogeny
- Rock age(s): Mesozoic and Cenozoic
- Rock type(s): sandstone, slate

The Shelag Range or Shelag Ridge (Russian: Шелагский хребет) is a range of mountains in far Northeastern Russia. Administratively the range is part of the Chukotka Autonomous Okrug of the Russian Federation. The area of the range is desolate and uninhabited except for a few mining areas.

The range was named after the Shelags, a little-known ethnic group that lived on the Arctic coast to the east of Cape Shelagsky.

== Geography ==
The Shelag Range is a northwestern prolongation of the Chukotka Mountains and is the northernmost range of the system. This mountain chain runs in a roughly WNW/ESE direction for about 120 kilometres (75 mi), north of the Arctic Circle and parallel to the East Siberian Sea shore. Its western end is Cape Shelagsky and Chaun Bay and it is limited to the south by the Ichvuveyem Range, which rises by the Ichvuveyem river, beyond which lie the Chaun Lowlands. To the east the range is bound by the valley of the Keveyem (Кэвеем) river. The highest point is 1,105 metres (3,625 ft) high Medvezhy Logovo peak.

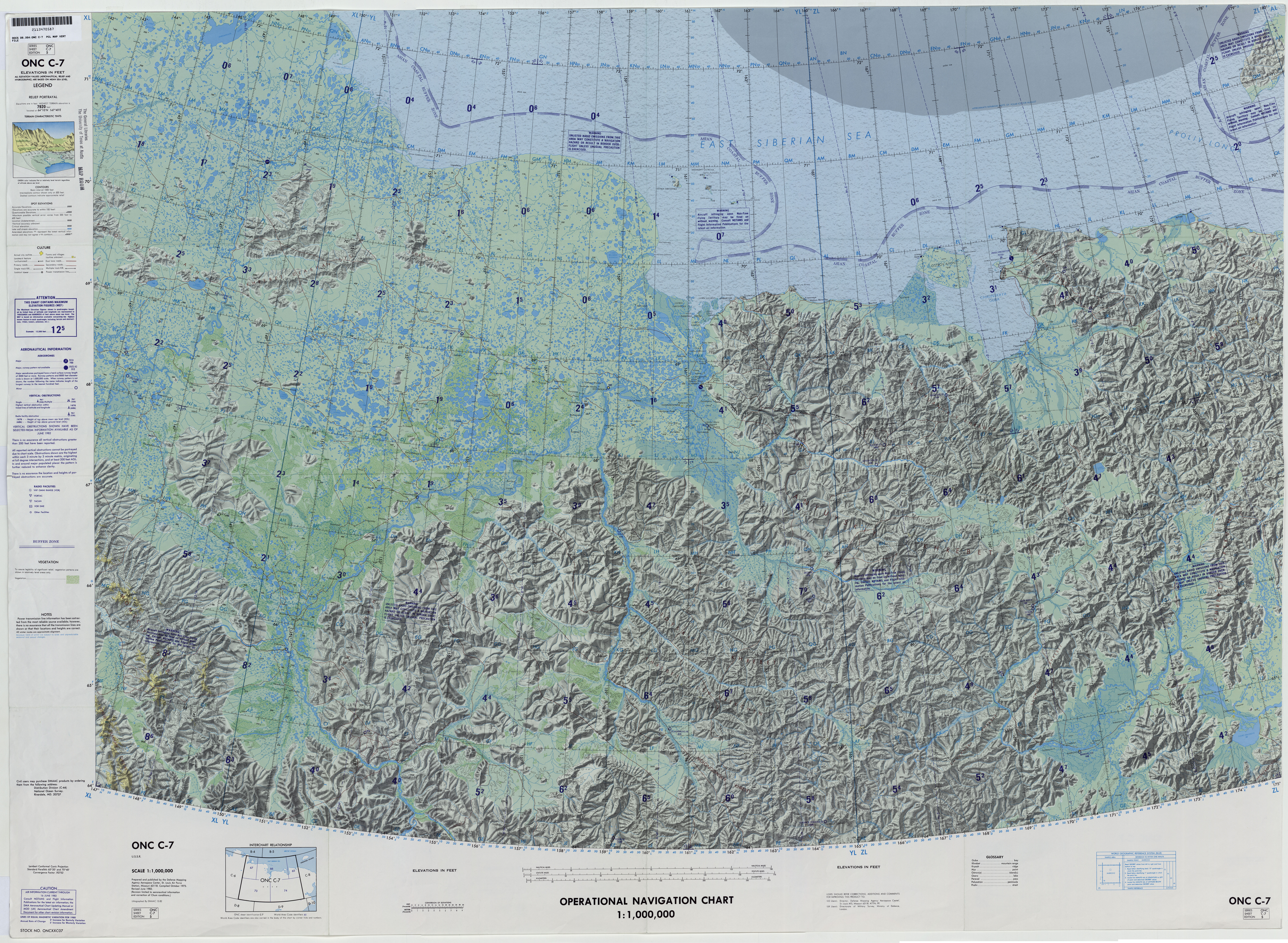
Defense Mapping Agency topographical map showing the area of the Shelag Range on the upper right.

== Flora ==
The range has a barren look. The mountain slopes are covered with very little vegetation, mainly grasses, shrubs and "dwarf cedar", up to 300 metres (980 ft) to 500 metres (1,600 ft). At higher elevations there is only rocky mountain tundra. The climate of the area is subarctic.
