= Iskhodnaya =

Mountain in Russia

- Исходная
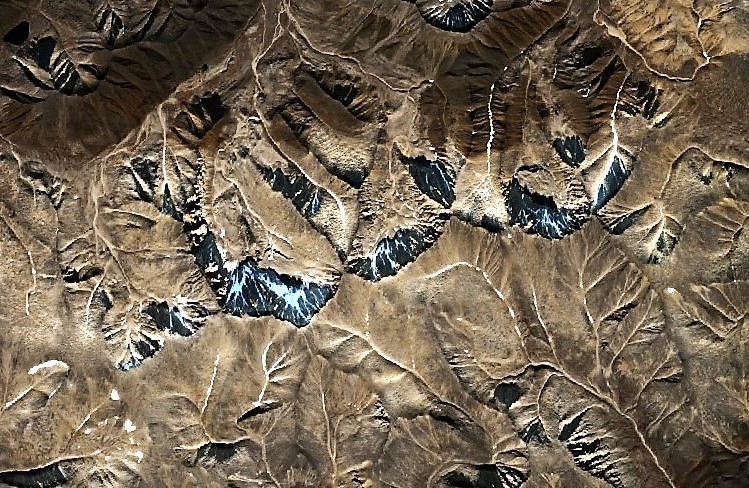
- Sentinel-2 image of the summit area.

Highest point
- Elevation: 1,887 m (6,191 ft)
- Prominence: 1,495 m (4,905 ft)
- Listing: Ribu
- Coordinates: 67°48′59″N 178°17′19″E

Geography
- Location within Chukotka Autonomous Okrug
- Location: Chukotka Autonomous Okrug, Russian Far East
- Parent range: Chantal Range, Chukotka Mountains

Iskhodnaya (Russian: Исходная) is a mountain in the Chantal Range. Administratively it is part of the Chukotka Autonomous Okrug, Russian Federation.

== Geography ==
This 1,887 m (6,191 ft) high mountain is the highest point of the Chukotka Mountains, part of the East Siberian System of ranges. It rises just above the northern bank of the high course of the Chantalvergyrgyn River.

The height of the summit is 1,887 metres (6,191 ft) according to the Great Soviet Encyclopedia. According to other sources it is 1,843 metres (6,047 ft) high. The same mountain is marked as a 6,081-foot-high (1,853 m) peak in the C-8 sheet of the Defense Mapping Agency Navigation charts. The same map shows another peak that is 6,047-foot-high (1,843 m), just a short distance to the west in the same ridge of the Chantal Range.

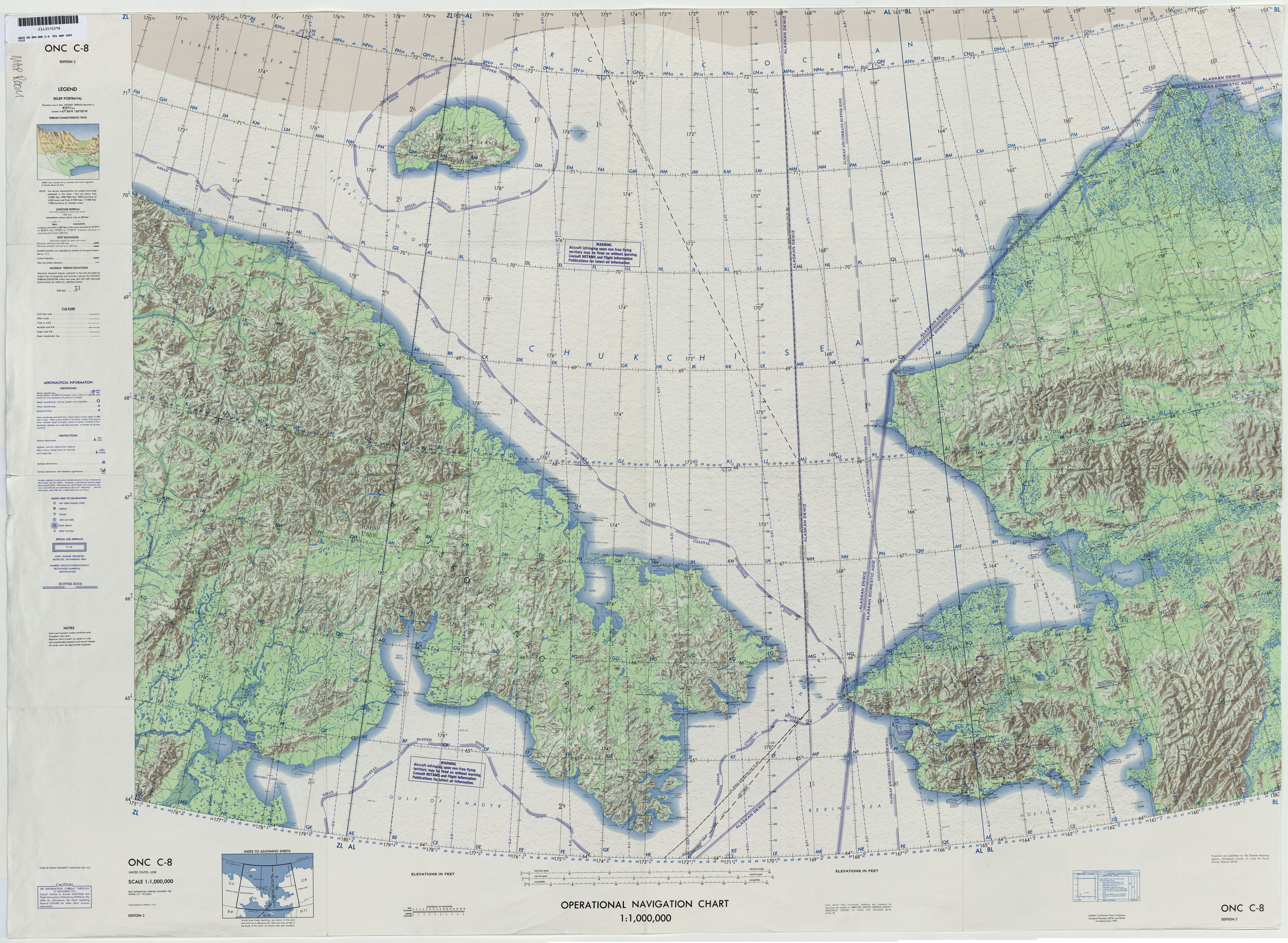
Defense Mapping Agency topographical map of the Chukchi Sea, 1973

== See also ==
- Highest points of Russian Federal subjects
- List of mountains in Russia
