= Ekityki =

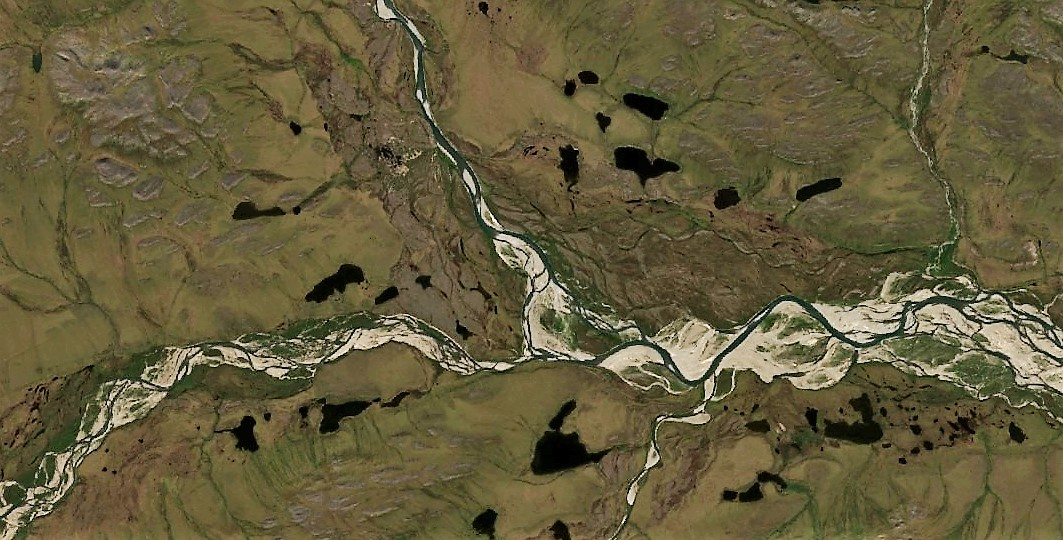
- Sentinel-2 image of the confluence of the Chantalvergyrgyn and the Ekityki

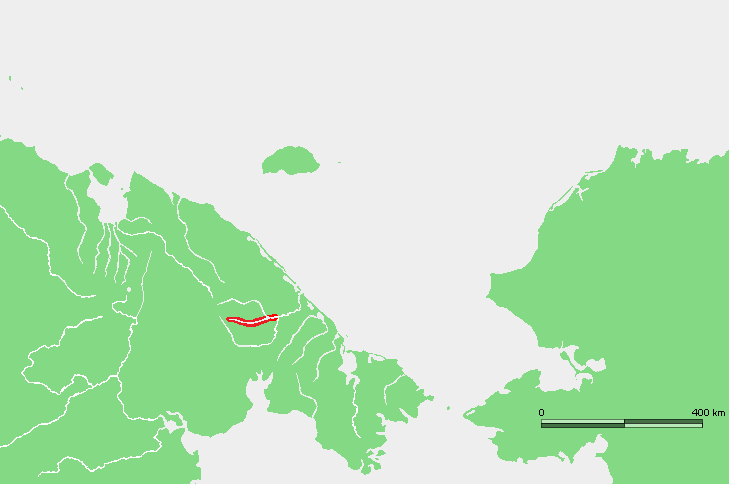
- Location of the Ekityki course

Location
- Country: Russia

Physical characteristics
- Mouth: Amguema
  - coordinates: 67°39′41″N 178°42′57″W
- Length: 154 km (96 mi)
- Basin size: 10,300 km^{2} (4,000 sq mi)

Basin features
- Progression: Amguema→ East Siberian Sea

The Ekityki (Russian: Экитыки) is a stream located in Chukotka, in Far East Siberia. It belongs to the Chukotka Autonomous Okrug administrative region of Russia. It is 160 kilometres (99 mi) long, and has a drainage basin of 10,300 square kilometres (4,000 sq mi).

The easternmost remains of woolly rhinoceroses (Coelodonta antiquitatis) have been found in the Ekityki river basin.

== Course ==
The Ekityki originates in the Chukotka Mountains. It makes its way eastwards through sparsely populated mountainous areas of the Eastern Siberian tundra. It flows across the Ekityki lake into the left side of the Amguema in Central Chukotka. The Chantalvergyrgyn is a left tributary of the Ekityki.

== Fauna ==
Salmon, whitefish, vendace, grayling, pike, rainbow herring (northwestern smelt), burbot, bull trout and loach are common in its waters.

== See also ==
- List of rivers of Russia
