= Cape Shelagsky =

Cape in Chukotskiy autonomous region

Cape Shelagsky Мыс Шелагский Erri / Ytrin
- Cape
- Location in Chukotka Autonomous Okrug
- Coordinates: 70°06′28″N 170°28′15″E
- Location: Chukotka Autonomous Okrug, Russia
- Offshore water bodies: East Siberian Sea, Chaun Bay

Cape Shelagsky or Cape Shelag (Russian: Мыс Шелагский; Chukot: Ытрин, romanized: Ytrin), also known as Erri by the Siberian Yupik, is a headland situated in eastern Siberia, Russia on the shores of the East Siberian Sea.

The cape was named after the Shelags, a little-known ethnic group that lived on the Arctic coast to the east of Cape Shelagsky.

== Geography ==
It is the eastern headland at the entrance of Chaun Bay. The cape is located at the western end of the Shelag Range, the northwesternmost subrange of the Chukotka Mountains.
