= Chantal Range =

Mountain range in Russia

- Чантальский хребет
- Location within Chukotka Autonomous Okrug

Highest point
- Peak: Iskhodnaya
- Elevation: 1,843 m (6,047 ft)
- Coordinates: 67°48′59″N 178°17′19″E

Dimensions
- Length: 100 km (62 mi)

Geography
- Location: Chukotka Autonomous Okrug, Far Eastern Federal District
- Parent range: Chukotka Mountains

Geology
- Orogeny: Alpine orogeny
- Rock type(s): Sandstone, shale

The Chantal Range (Russian: Чантальский хребет) is a range of mountains in far Northeastern Russia. Administratively the range is part of the Chukotka Autonomous Okrug of the Russian Federation. The area of the range is desolate and uninhabited.

== Geography ==
The Chantal Range is located in the central area of the Chukotka Mountains, part of the East Siberian System of ranges. This mountain chain runs in a roughly WSW/ENE direction for about 100 km. It is limited to the west by the bank of the Chantalveergyn River, beyond which rises the Ekiatap Range; to the north it borders with the Palyavaam range, and to the south with the Ekityk Range. The highest point of the range is Iskhodnaya peak, reaching 1,843 metres (6,047 ft) —or 1,887 metres (6,191 ft) according to other sources. This summit is also the highest point of the Chukotka Mountains.

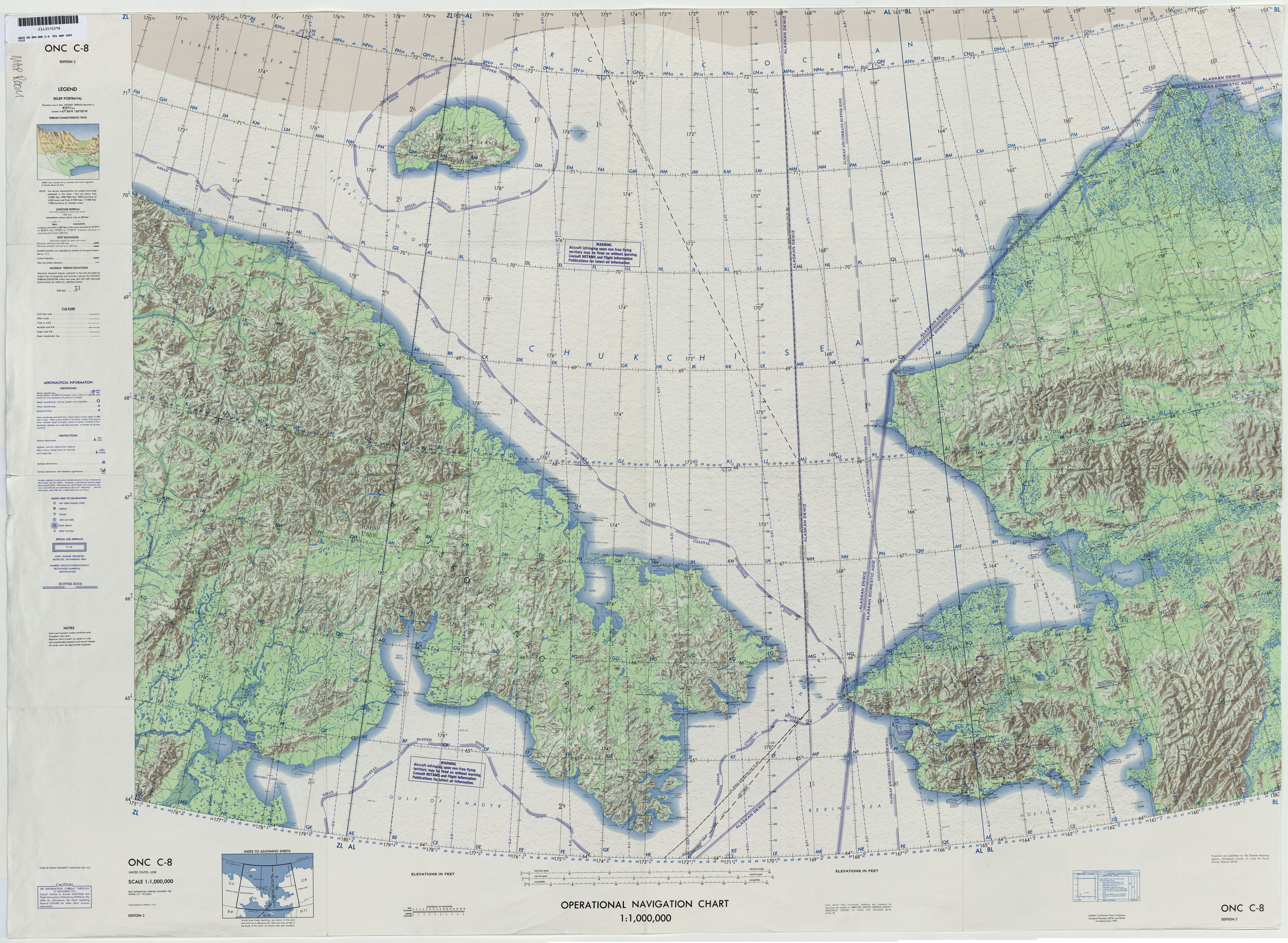
Defense Mapping Agency topographical map of the Chukchi Sea, 1973

== See also ==
- List of mountains and hills of Russia
