= Egvekinot =

Egvekinot Эгвекинот Эрвыӄыннот (Chukchi)
- Urban-type settlement
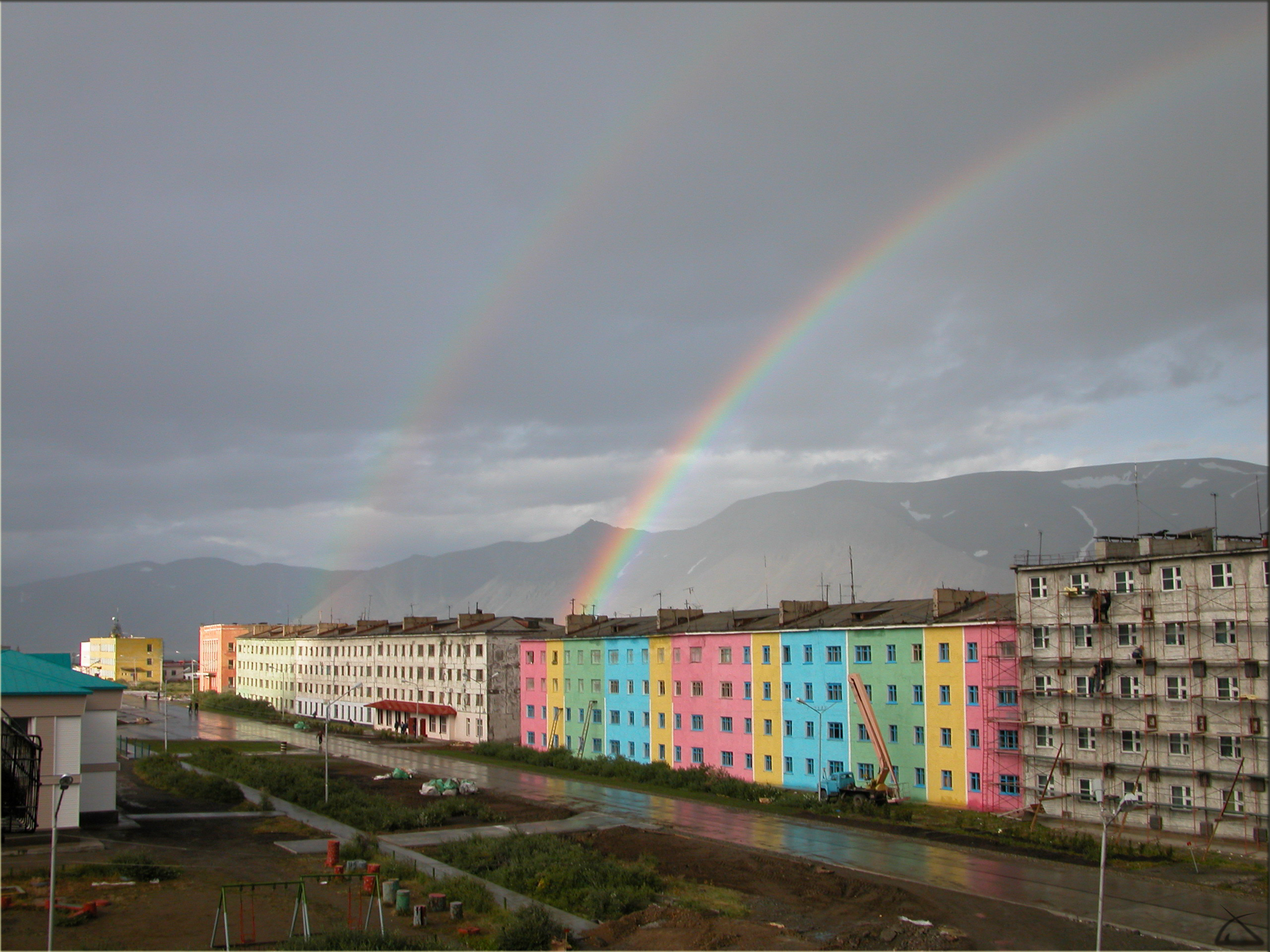
- Double rainbow over Egvekinot

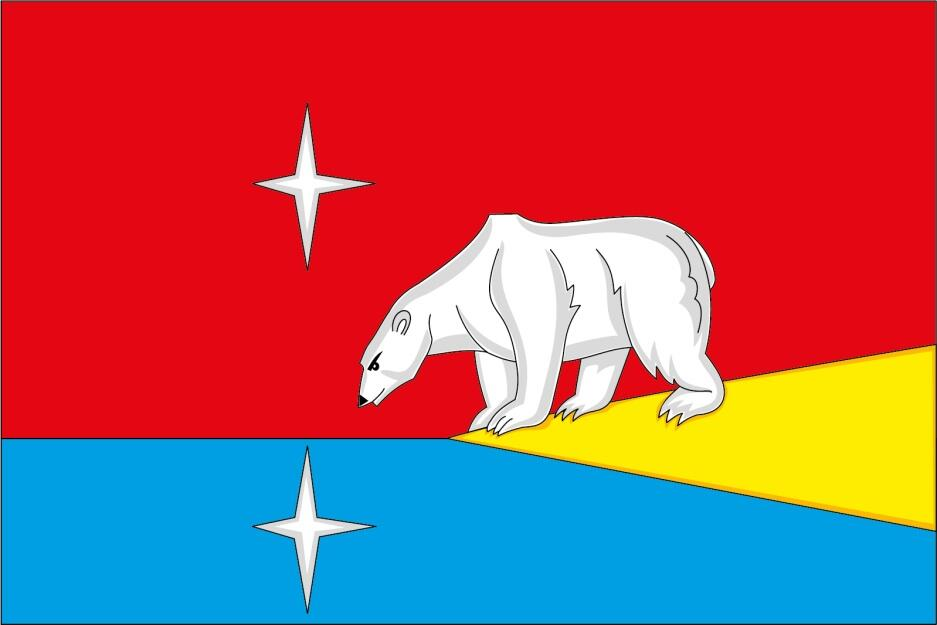
- Flag
- Interactive map of Egvekinot
- Location of Egvekinot Egvekinot (Chukotka Autonomous Okrug)
- Coordinates: 66°19′06″N 179°07′24″W
- Country: Russia
- Federal subject: Chukotka Autonomous Okrug
- Administrative district: Iultinsky District
- Founded: 1946

Government
  - Head: Alexey Geraskin
- Elevation: 14 m (46 ft)

Population (2010 Census)
  - Total: 2,790
  - Estimate (January 2016): 2,815 (+0.9%)

Administrative status
  - Capital of: Iultinsky District

Municipal status
  - Municipal district: Iultinsky Municipal District
  - Urban settlement: Egvekinot Urban Settlement
  - Capital of: Iultinsky Municipal District, Egvekinot Urban settlement
- Time zone: UTC+12 (MSK+9)
- Postal codes: 689201, 689202
- Dialing code: +7 42734
- OKTMO ID: 77715000051

Egvekinot (Russian: Эгвекино́т; Chukchi: Эрвыӄыннот, Èrvyḳynnot, lit. sharp, hard land) is an urban locality (an urban-type settlement) and the administrative center of Iultinsky District in Chukotka Autonomous Okrug, Russia. The population is 2,790 (2010 census).

== Geography ==
Egvekinot, located on the coast of Kresta Bay (a part of the Bering Sea) at the foot of mountains some 800 m (2,600 ft) high, is a port settlement with a maximum depth of 35 m (115 ft). It is located 1,675 km (1,041 mi) from Magadan, 236 km (147 mi) from Anadyr, and 6,097 km (3,789 mi) from Moscow.

== History ==
Archeological excavations around the settlement have indicated that the area was inhabited in Neolithic times and possibly even in the Mesolithic, with the discovery of a number of stone implements, tools for grinding and obsidian arrowheads, all of which are now stored in the local museum in Egvekinot.

In 1937, metal deposits were discovered in Iultin. Due to the isolated nature of the area, the transportation of any minerals extracted would be difficult and it was decided that a new port would be created to serve the Iultin mines. Dalstroy formed a new section, "Chukotstroy", whose aim was to construct Egvekinot and the road connecting it with the Iultin mines.

Egvekinot was founded in 1946, under the supervision of B. N. Lenkov, the first head of Chukotstroy, specifically as a port so that the nearby Iultin Mining Complex about 180 km (110 mi) north of the settlement could be easily supplied with materials. On July 16, 1946, the MV Sovetskaya Latviya brought the first 1,500 settlers to Egvekinot. These construction workers were mainly political prisoners rather than willing emigrants. This labor force was responsible for the construction of the entire infrastructure in the area, including the construction of Egvekinot, the nearby village of Ozyorny, and the village of Iultin, as well as the 270 km (170 mi) road linking the mines to the new port, the power station, warehouses, and residential and industrial buildings.

As a result of this, the settlement became quite an important hub causing the population to grow to over 5,000 by the late 1980s. However, when the mining complex was closed in 1993, the economy of Egvekinot suffered with the population falling rapidly throughout the 1990s, although the 2010 Census details indicate a slight recovery in recent years.

== Administrative and municipal status ==
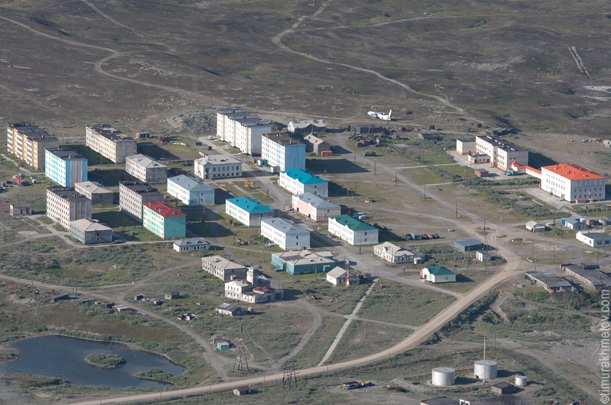
Aerial view of Ozyorny Microdistrict

Within the framework of administrative divisions, Egvekinot serves as the administrative center of Iultinsky District, to which it is directly subordinated. As a municipal division, the urban-type settlement of Egvekinot is incorporated within Iultinsky Municipal District as Egvekinot Urban Settlement.

The nearby former selo of Ozyorny has been incorporated into Egvekinot as Ozyorny Microdistrict.

== Transportation ==
Egvekinot can be reached by flights from Anadyr (236 km (147 mi)) which land at the Kresta Bay Airport, though the spring meltwaters can cause the runway to become flooded. Infrequent helicopter service to Provideniya by Chukotavia.

Egvekinot is linked to the now abandoned settlement of Iultin by the Iultin-Egvekinot road (around 200 km (120 mi)) via Amguema, as well as to the abandoned settlements of Dorozhny, Tranzitny, and Geologichesky. The road crosses the Amguema River.

== Demographics ==
Demographic Evolution
1959 Census	1970 Census	1979 Census	1989 Census	2002 Census	2010 Census
3,015	3,360	4,657	5,478	2,413	2,790

== Culture and sights ==
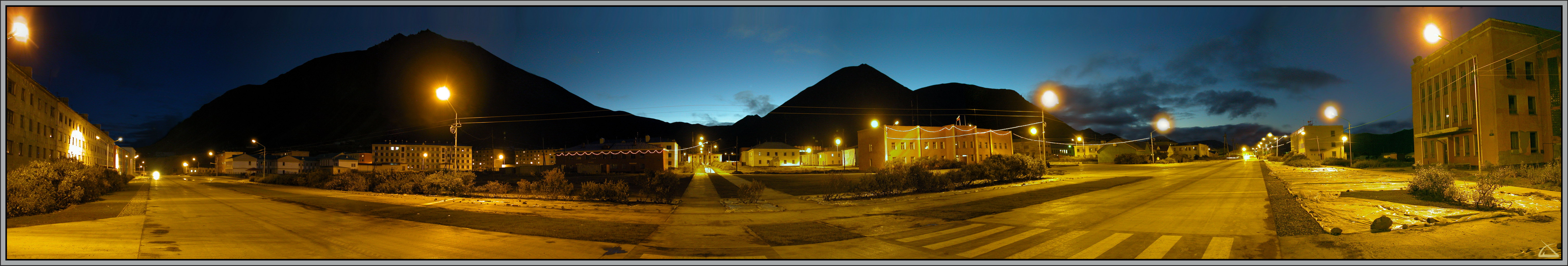
Nighttime panorama

A monument to the Mi-8 helicopter, a common sight in the air over Chukotka, is located in the airport.

There is a museum in the settlement which deals mainly with local history, people, and archeology, as well as a cultural center, home to the Zalivskiye Napevy folk chorus, the Sone song group, and Severyanka folk dance ensemble.

Egvekinot has one of only two ski slopes in Chukotka; a ski lodge can be found near the Staratelsky Stream.

== Climate ==
Egvekinot, historically having a polar tundra climate (Köppen ET), has recently transitioned into a subarctic climate (Köppen Dfc) due to global warming. Temperatures average below freezing from October all the way through to the following May, and can average below −20 °C (−4 °F) from December through to March. The short summer is temperate. The average temperature in January is −18.1 °C (−0.6 °F), and the average temperature in July is 10.5 °C (50.9 °F). Temperatures over 20 °C (68 °F) can occur during the brief summer, especially in July. On July 10, 2019 the temperature reached for the first and only time 30 °C (86 °F), with the record high being 30.6 °C (87.1 °F).

Climate data for Egvekinot, 1991–2020 normals, extremes 1948–present
Month	Jan	Feb	Mar	Apr	May	Jun	Jul	Aug	Sep	Oct	Nov	Dec	Year
Record high °C (°F)	6.3 (43.3)	5.1 (41.2)	6.0 (42.8)	7.8 (46.0)	23.0 (73.4)	28.8 (83.8)	30.6 (87.1)	25.0 (77.0)	19.4 (66.9)	12.8 (55.0)	7.9 (46.2)	9.5 (49.1)	30.6 (87.1)
Mean daily maximum °C (°F)	−14.3 (6.3)	−13.1 (8.4)	−11.8 (10.8)	−5.8 (21.6)	2.8 (37.0)	11.3 (52.3)	14.3 (57.7)	12.9 (55.2)	7.8 (46.0)	0.1 (32.2)	−6.2 (20.8)	−11.9 (10.6)	−1.2 (29.9)
Daily mean °C (°F)	−18.1 (−0.6)	−17.2 (1.0)	−16.2 (2.8)	−9.9 (14.2)	−0.5 (31.1)	6.7 (44.1)	10.5 (50.9)	9.5 (49.1)	4.8 (40.6)	−2.3 (27.9)	−9.1 (15.6)	−15.2 (4.6)	−4.7 (23.4)
Mean daily minimum °C (°F)	−21.8 (−7.2)	−21.3 (−6.3)	−20.5 (−4.9)	−14.0 (6.8)	−3.6 (25.5)	3.0 (37.4)	7.6 (45.7)	6.7 (44.1)	2.0 (35.6)	−4.8 (23.4)	−12.3 (9.9)	−18.6 (−1.5)	−8.1 (17.4)
Record low °C (°F)	−45.8 (−50.4)	−46.9 (−52.4)	−44.8 (−48.6)	−36.1 (−33.0)	−27.8 (−18.0)	−7.1 (19.2)	−0.1 (31.8)	−6 (21)	−10 (14)	−23.9 (−11.0)	−36 (−33)	−38.1 (−36.6)	−46.9 (−52.4)
Average precipitation mm (inches)	29 (1.1)	36 (1.4)	35 (1.4)	19 (0.7)	33 (1.3)	43 (1.7)	83 (3.3)	86 (3.4)	60 (2.4)	65 (2.6)	50 (2.0)	33 (1.3)	572 (22.6)
Average precipitation days	12.3	12.3	11.8	13.2	15.6	14.6	15.9	17.3	13.1	16.1	14.4	14.4	171
Average relative humidity (%)	71.2	71.4	72.8	74.3	79.4	80.1	79.6	80.9	76.0	70.5	69.2	69.0	74.5
Source 1: Погода и климат (temperatures)
Source 2: climatebase.ru (1948–2011)

== See also ==
- List of inhabited localities in Iultinsky District
