= Palyavaam =

Palyavaam Russian: Паляваам
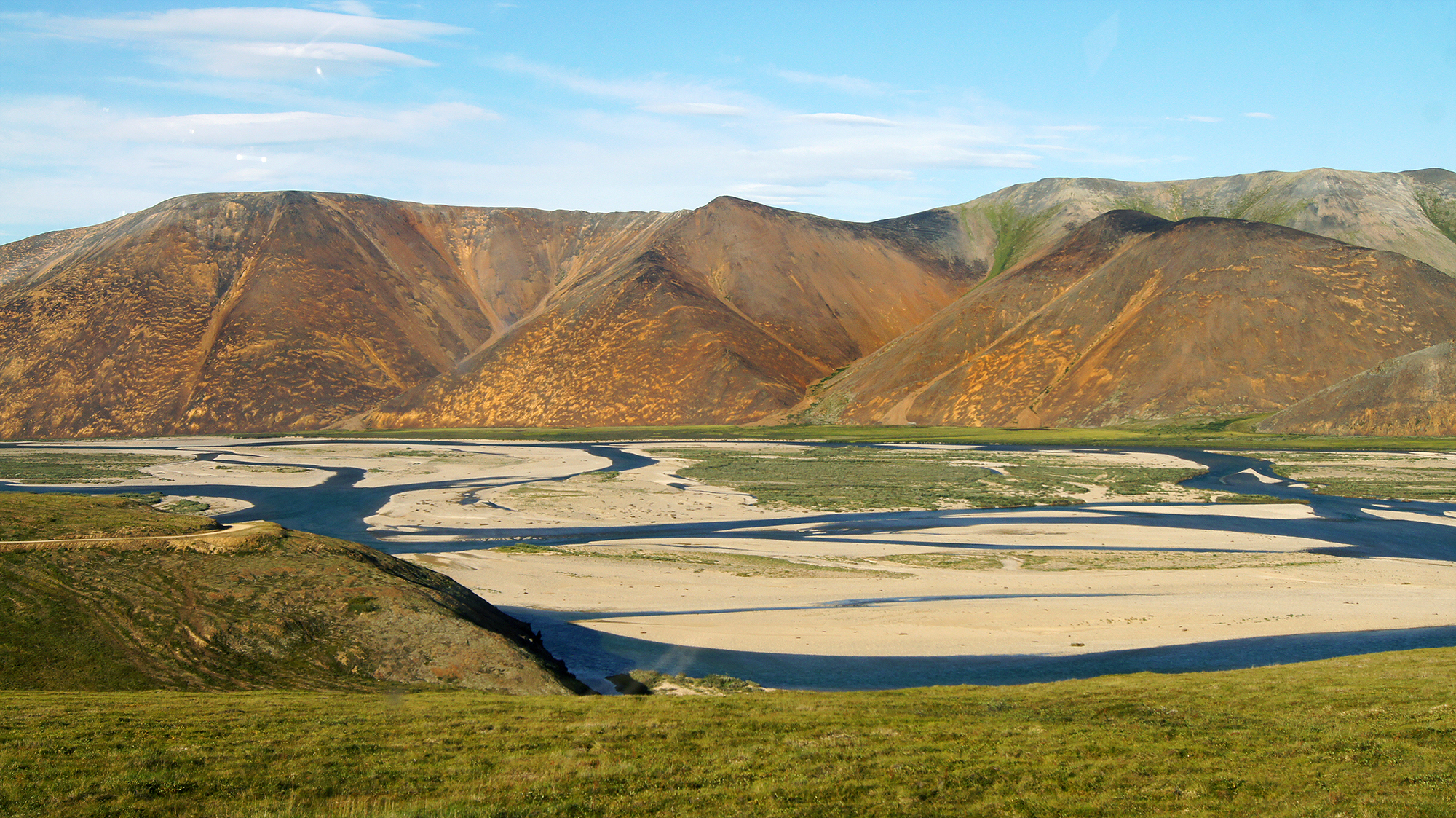
- View of the Palyavaam River

- Location of the mouth in the Chukotka Autonomous Okrug, Russia

Location
- Country: Russia
- Federal subject: Chukotka Autonomous Okrug

Physical characteristics
- Source
  - location: Palyavaam Range
  - coordinates: 68°0′34″N 177°41′51″E
  - elevation: 512 m (1,680 ft)
- Mouth
  - location: Chaun
  - coordinates: 68.7178°N 170.8281°E
  - elevation: 0 m (0 ft)
- Length: 416 km (258 mi)
- Basin size: 12,900 km^{2} (5,000 sq mi)

Basin features
- Progression: Chaun→ East Siberian Sea

The Palyavaam (Russian: Паляваам) is a river in the Chukotka Autonomous Okrug, Russian Far East. It is 416 kilometres (258 mi) long, and has a drainage basin of 12,900 square kilometres (5,000 sq mi).

There is a small populated place in its basin also called Palyavaam. The Humpback whitefish, the East Siberian Grayling, Pink salmon, Chum salmon and Arctic char, are some of the fish species found in its waters.

== Course ==
It has its source in the Palyavaam Range of the Chukotka Mountains. The Palyavaam flows in a roughly westward direction and passes through the sparsely populated areas of Chukotka. Finally it flows into the Chaun close to its outflow into the East Siberian Sea, at the Chaunskaya Bay near Rytkuchi.

The Palyavaam has numerous tributaries. The most important ones are the Elkakvun, Palyarynnat, Karpungveyem, Levtuttyveyem, Kookvyn, Vykvylvegyrgyn and Pekychyn.

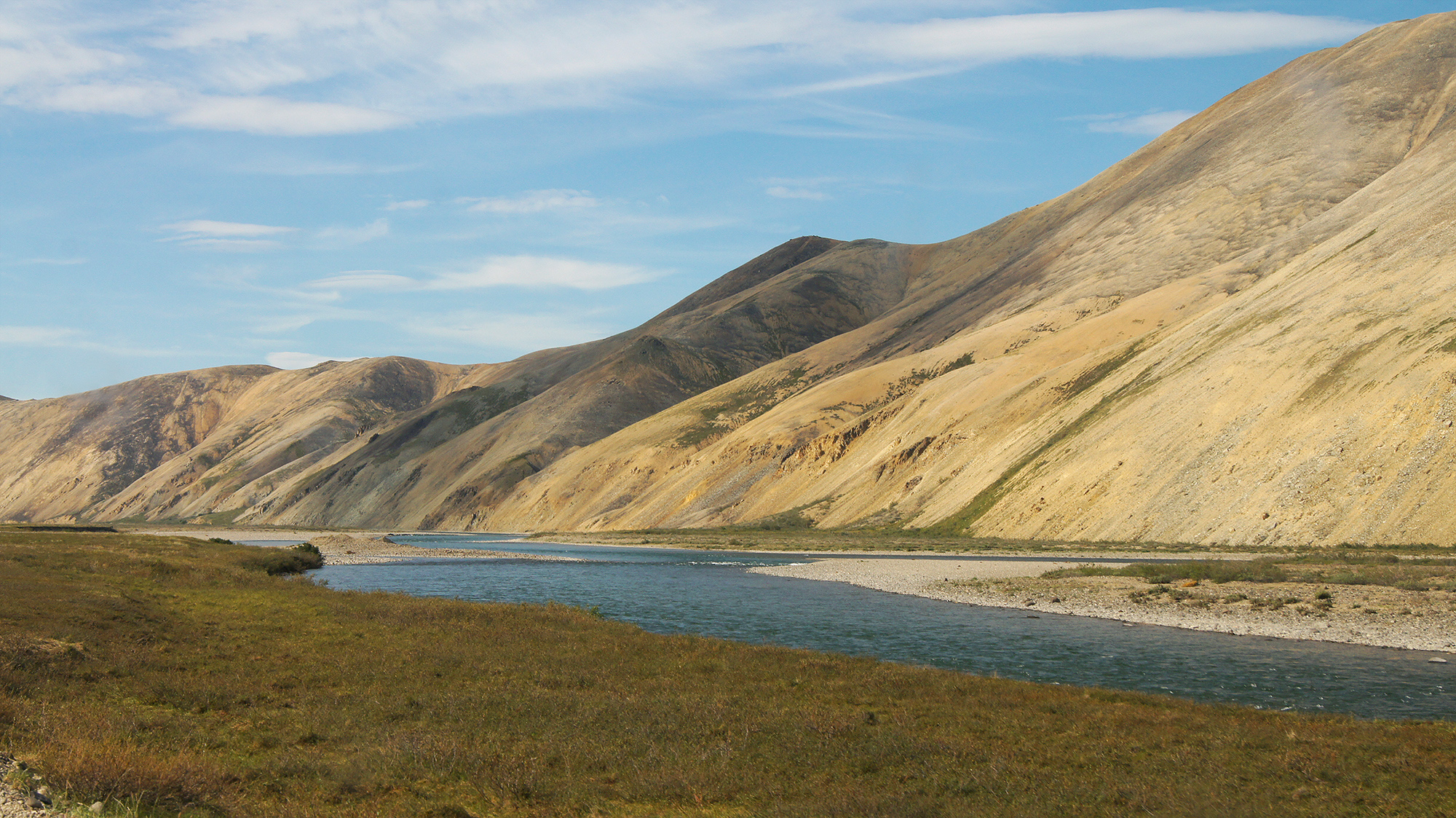
The river flowing at the feet of the Chukotka Mountains.

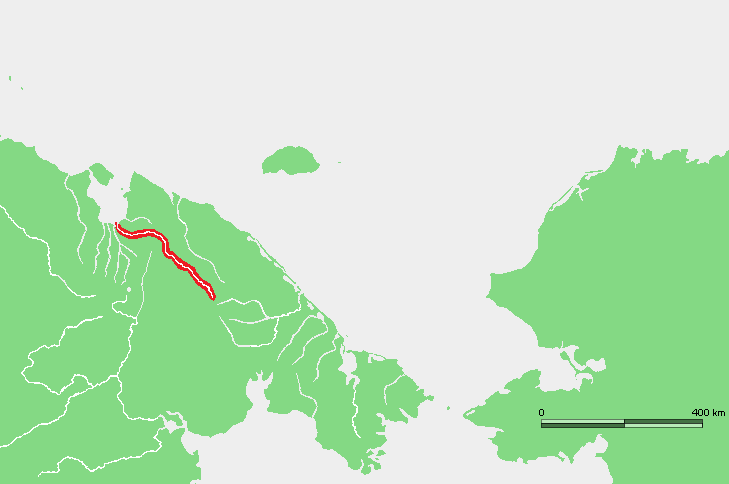
Location of the Palyavaam River course.

== See also ==
- List of rivers of Russia
