= Port of Ilulissat =

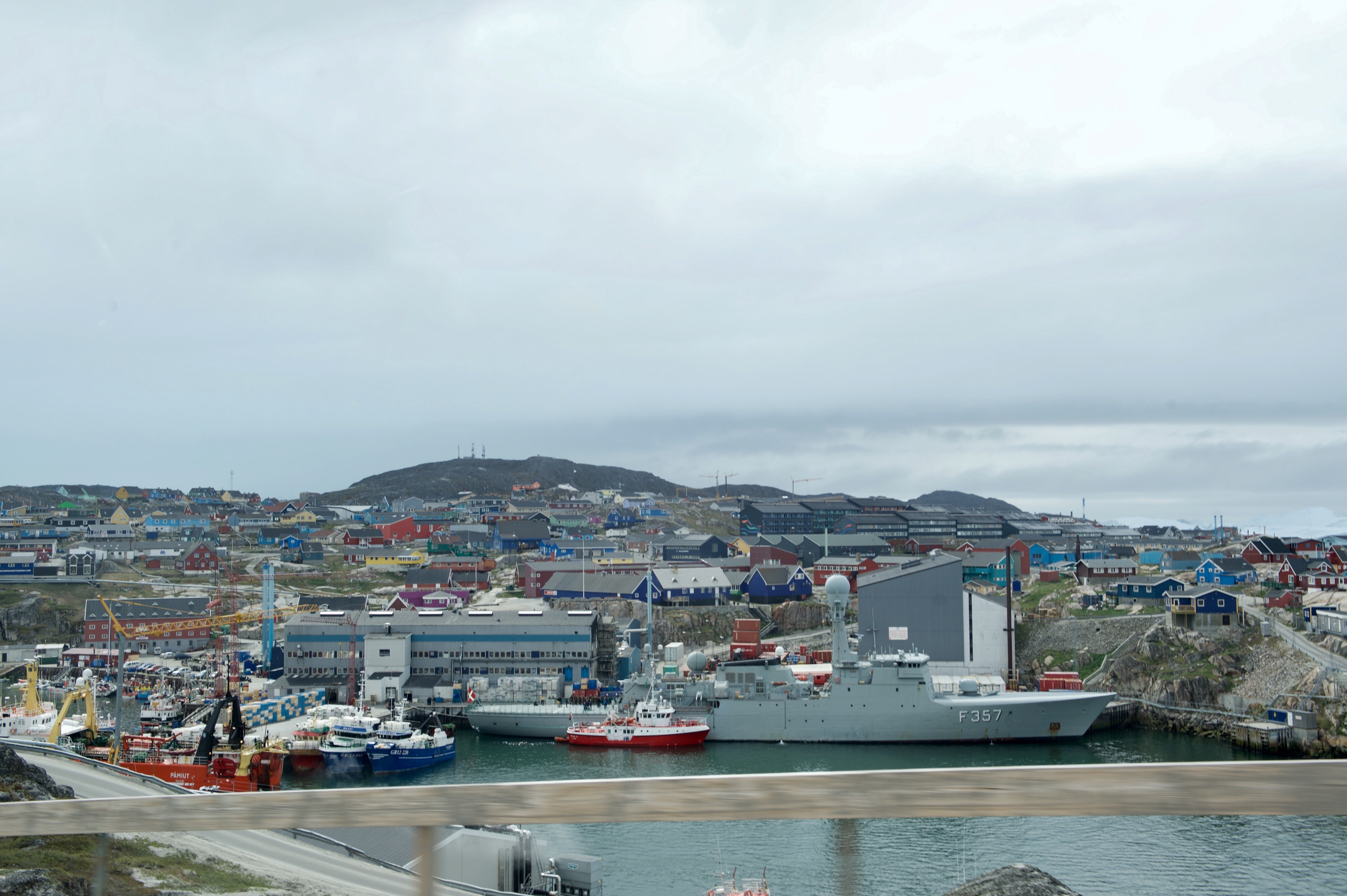
- Container terminal, Ilulissat
- Click on the map for a fullscreen view

Location
- Country: Greenland
- Location: Ilulissat
- Coordinates: 69.222°N 51.095°W
- UN/LOCODE: GLILL

Details
- Owned by: Public
- Type of harbour: Deep-water seaport

Statistics
- Website www.royalarcticline.com

Port and Harbour of Ilulissat is an Atlantic port in Disko Bay at Ilulissat, Greenland.

Accessible most of the year, it is operated by Royal Arctic Line, Arctic Umiaq Line and Royal Greenland. The harbour can be restricted during winter due to sea ice. The inner port area is home to a marina for smaller vessels and ferry and larger vessels to the west side of the port area.
