= Port of Pevek =

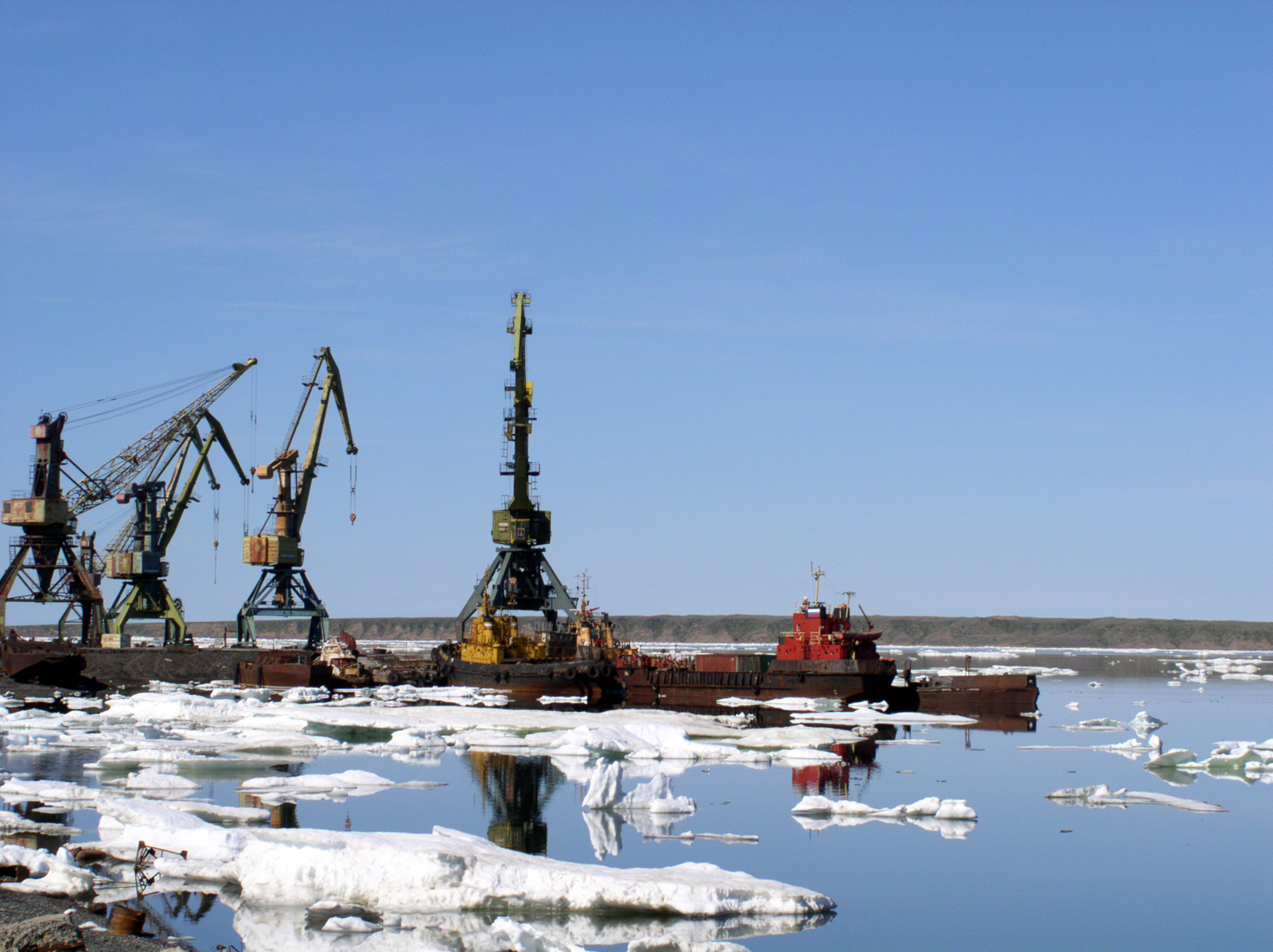
- Port cranes and vessels in Port of Pevek
- Click on the map for a fullscreen view

Location
- Country: Russia
- Location: Pevek, Chukotka
- Coordinates: 69°42′17″N 170°15′49″E
- UN/LOCODE: RUPWE

Details
- Opened: 20 April 1951
- Operated by: AO Morport Pevek
- Land area: 190,000.0 square metres (19.00000 ha)
- No. of piers: 3

Port of Pevek (port code RU PWE, Russian: Порт Певек) is a seaport situated on the northern coast of microdistrict Kosa, Pevek, Russia, located in southeastern area of Pevek Strait (Chaun Bay). It is the most northern seaport of Russia.

== See also ==
- Transport in Russia
