= Chaun =

Chaun Чаун
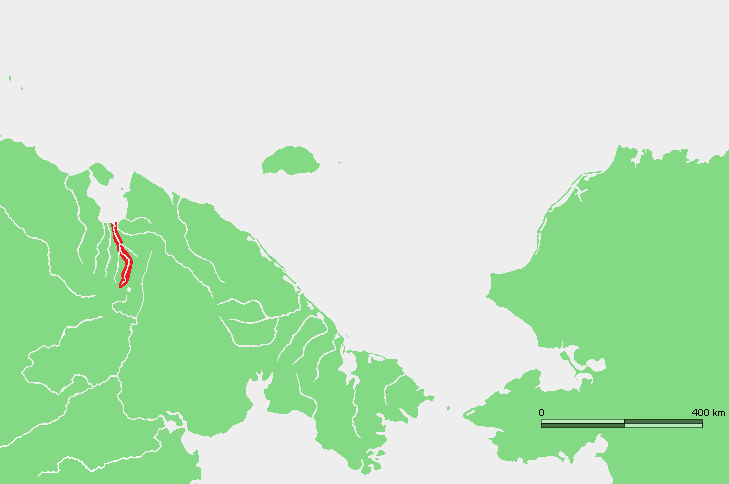
- Location of the Chaun course.

- Location in the Chukotka Autonomous Okrug, Russia

Location
- Country: Russia

Physical characteristics
- Source: Anadyr Plateau
  - location: Chukotka Autonomous Okrug
  - coordinates: 67°33′4″N 171°48′30″E
- Mouth: Chaun Bay
  - coordinates: 68°55′16″N 170°38′59″E
  - elevation: 0 m (0 ft)
- Length: 205 km (127 mi)
- Basin size: 23,000 square kilometres (8,900 mi^{2})
- Discharge
  - location: mouth
  - average: 90 m^{3}/s (3,200 cu ft/s)

The Chaun (Russian: Чаун) is a stream in Far East Siberia. It flows roughly northwards, passing through the sparsely populated areas of the Siberian tundra. It is 205 kilometres (127 mi) long, and has a drainage basin of 23,000 square kilometres (8,900 sq mi).

== Course ==
The Chaun originates in rivers flowing from the Ilirney Range and the northwestern edge of the crater of Lake Elgygytgyn (Maly Chaun). After joining they flow into the East Siberian Sea at Chaun Bay, 100 kilometres (62 mi) south of the port town Pevek. The river Palyavaam discharges into a right distributary of the Chaun.

Its most important tributaries are the Ugatkyn from the left side and the Milguveyem from its right side. The Chaun river gives the Chaun Bay its name. The Chaun and its tributaries belong to the Chukotka Autonomous Okrug administrative region of Russia.

== See also ==
- List of rivers of Russia
