= Amguema (river) =

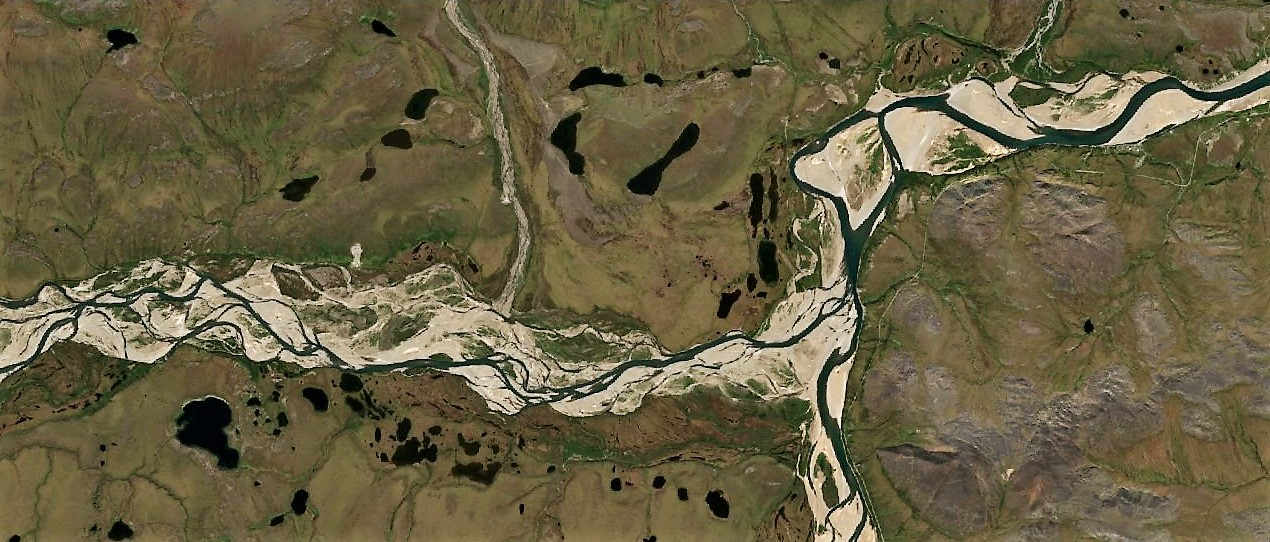
- Sentinel-2 image of the confluence of the Ekityki (left) and the Amguema

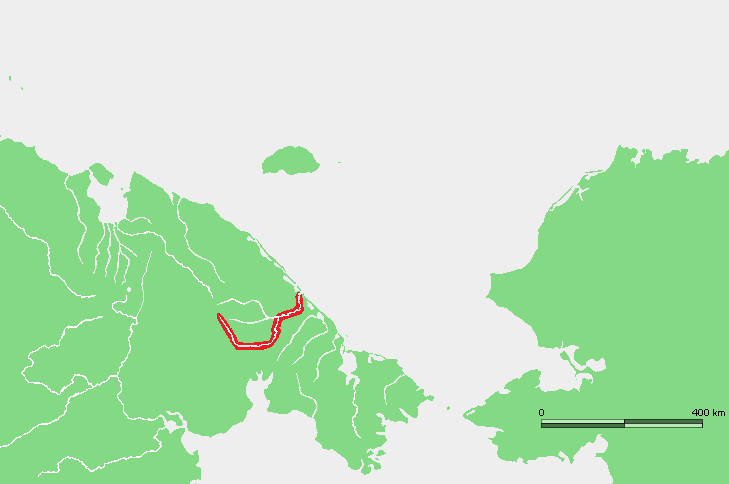
- Native name: Амгуэма (Russian); Оʼмваам (Chukot)

Location
- Country: Russia

Physical characteristics
- Source
  - coordinates: 68°49′N 177°24′E
- Mouth: Chukchi Sea
  - coordinates: 68.2533°N 177.4239°W
- Length: 498 km (309 mi)
- Basin size: 28,100 km^{2} (10,800 sq mi)
- Discharge
  - average: 285 m^{3}/s (10,100 cu ft/s)

The Amguema (Russian: Амгуэ́ма, Chukot: Оʼмваам, O'mvaam; in its upper course Вульвывее́м, Vulvyveyem) is a river in Chukotka Autonomous Okrug, Russia. It is 498 kilometres (309 mi) long, and has a drainage basin of 28,100 square kilometres (10,800 sq mi).

Upriver there is the small town of Amguema, where about 600 mostly Chukchi people live.

== Geography ==
The Amguema flows roughly from SW to NE across the Chukotka Mountains. It belongs to the Amguema basin. It empties into the Chukchi Sea between Cape Schmidt and Cape Vankarem. The 154 km (96 mi) long Ekityki on its left is the main tributary of the Amguema.

== See also ==
- List of rivers of Russia
