= Chaunskaya Bay =

Bay of the East Siberian Sea, Russia

- Чаунская губа (Russian)
- Location of the bay in Chukotka

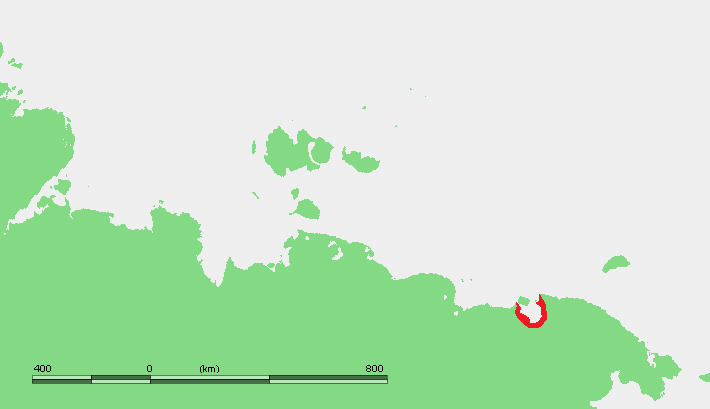
- Location: Far North
- Coordinates: 69.3494°N 169.7736°E
- River sources: Chaun River, Ichuveyem River, Palyavaam River, Lelyuveyem River, Pucheveyem River
- Ocean/sea sources: East Siberian Sea
- Basin countries: Russia
- Max. length: 140 km (87 mi)
- Max. width: 110 km (68 mi)
- Settlements: Pevek

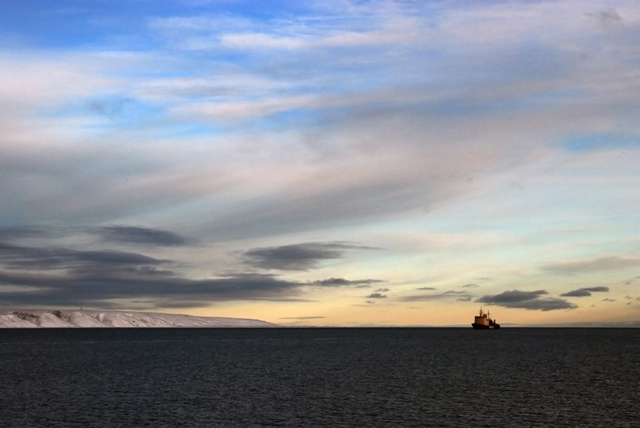
Chaunskaya Bay

The Chaunskaya Bay or Chaun Bay (Russian: Чаунская губа) is an Arctic bay in the East Siberian Sea, in Chaunsky District, Chukotka, northeast Siberia. There is Port of Pevek.

== Geography ==
The bay is open to the north and is 140 km in length. Its maximum width is 110 km. Its mouth is defined by Cape Shelagsky, the end of the Shelag Range, to the east and an unnamed part of Ayon Island to the west. It narrows where the Pevek Peninsula on the east approaches Ayon Island.

Owing to its northerly location, Chaunskaya Bay is covered with ice most of the year.

This bay is the center of one of the larger lowlands in Chukotka. A number of rivers flow into the southeastern corner: Chaun River, Ichuveyem River, Palyavaam River, Lelyuveyem River and Pucheveyem River. There is a protected natural area in the southeast. Lake Elgygytgyn is about 160 km southeast and the town of Bilibino about 160 km southwest.

== History ==
The first Russian to reach the area was probably Mikhail Stadukhin in 1649.

== Gallery ==
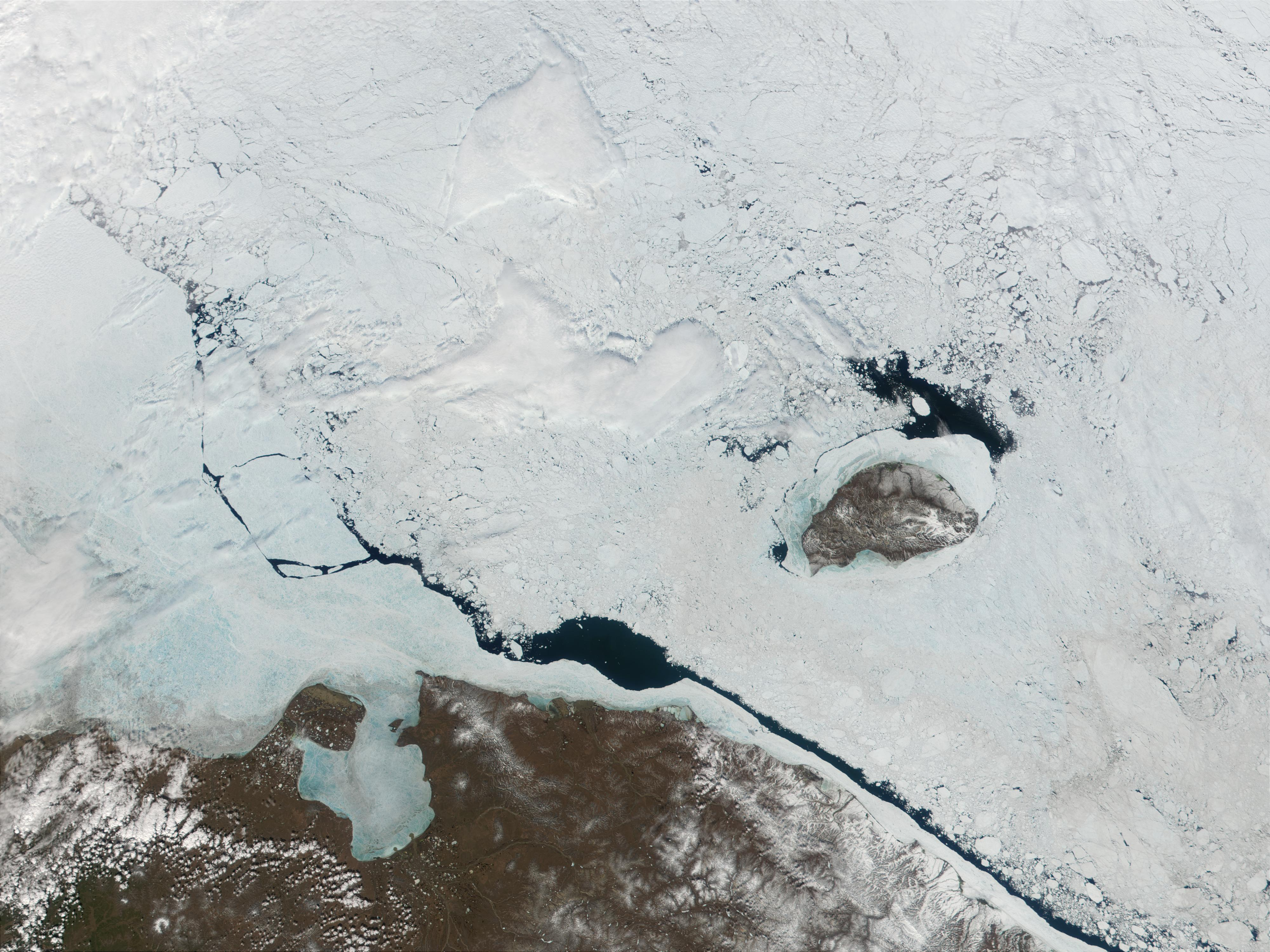
Chaunskaya Bay under ice. Ayon Island and the Pevek Peninsula visible. Wrangel Island to the northeast

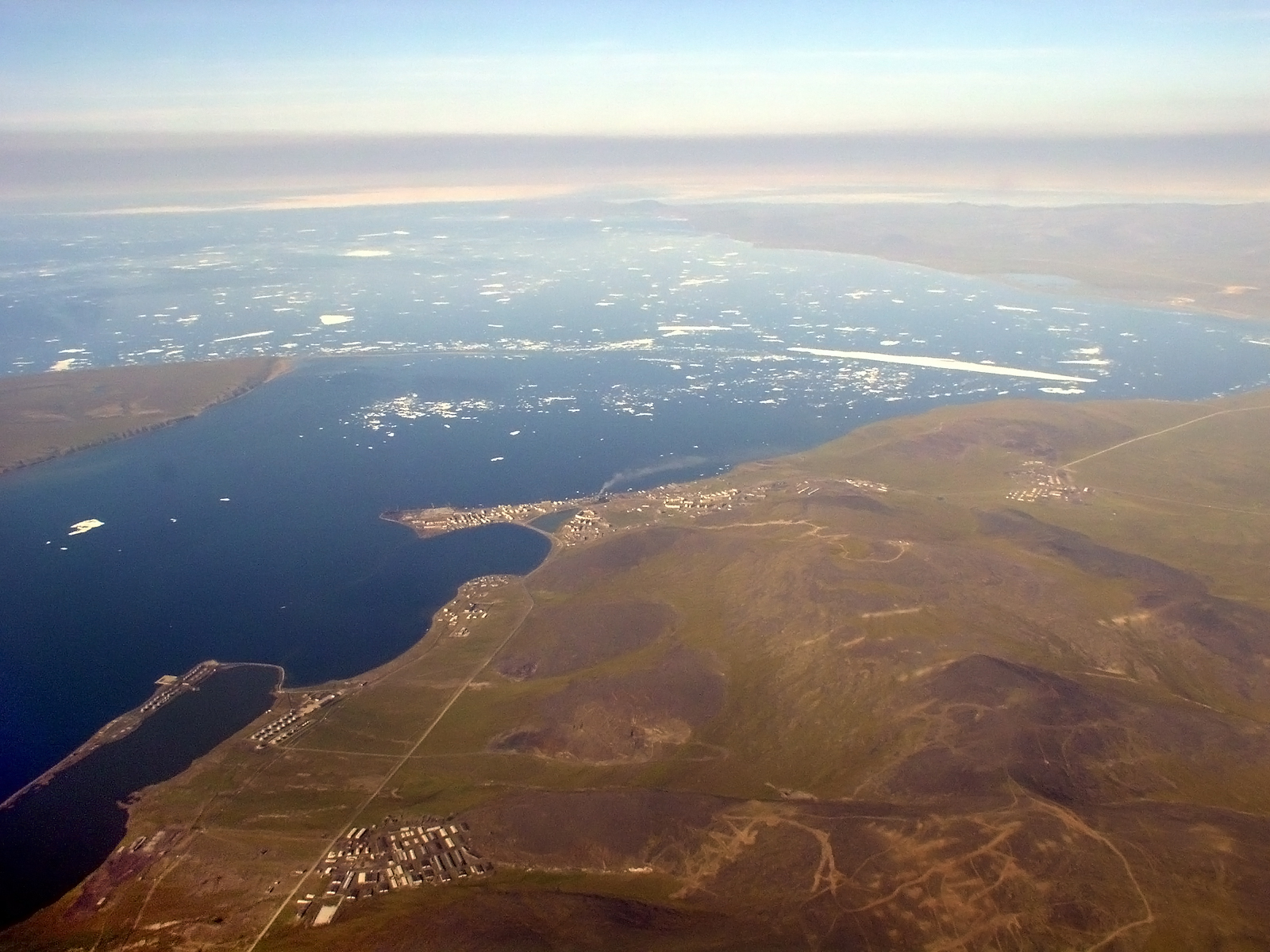
View of Pevek at the mouth of the bay
