= Chaplino dialect =

Dialect of the Central Siberian Yupik language

Chaplino Yupik
- Уӈазиӷмит Uŋazigmit
- Native to: Russia, United States
- Region: Chukotka Autonomous Okrug
- Native speakers: 1,200 (2010)
- Language family: Eskaleut: Eskimo; Yupik; Central Siberian Yupik; Chaplino Yupik
- Early forms: Proto-Eskimo–Aleut: Proto-Eskimo; Proto-Yupik
- Writing system: Cyrillic

Language codes
- ISO 639-3: –
- Glottolog: None

The Chaplino dialect (also known as Chaplinski dialect, Chaplinski Yupik, Eskimo Uŋaziq and Chaplinski language) is a dialect of the Central Siberian Yupik language spoken by the indigenous Eskimo people along the coast of Chukotka Autonomous Okrug in the Russian Far East, in the villages of Novoye Chaplino ("New Chaplino"), Provideniya, Uelkal and Sireniki. The Chaplino dialect is named after the village of Chaplino (also known as "Old Chaplino"; native name is "Уӈазиӄ" (Uŋaziq), from уӈаӄ "whisker" + suffix -зиӄ/-сиӄ). The Chaplino dialect is spoken by the majority of Russian Yuits.

The Chaplino dialect is close in lexicon and grammar to that of the St. Lawrence Island Yupik dialect ("Sivuqaghmiistun").

== Orthography ==
The Chaplino alphabet now stands as follows:

А а	Б б	В в	Г г	Ӷ ӷ	Д д	Е е	Ё ё	Ж ж	З з
И и	Й й	К к	Ӄ ӄ	Л л	Лъ лъ	М м	Н н	Нъ нъ	Ӈ ӈ
О о	П п	Р р	С с	Т т	У у	Ў ў	Ф ф	Х х	Ӽ ӽ
Ц ц	Ч ч	Ш ш	Щ щ	Ъ ъ	Ы ы	Ь ь	Э э	Ю ю	Я я

== Bibliography ==
- Меновщиков, Г. А. (1988). Материалы и исследования по языку и фольклору чаплинских эскимосов [Materials on the language and folklore of the Eskimo] (in Russian). Leningrad: Наука. ISBN 5-02-027861-0.
- Меновщиков, Г. А. (1997). Языки мира. Палеоазиатские языки [Languages of the world. Paleoasian languages] (in Russian). Moscow: Индрик. pp. 75–81. ISBN 5-85759-046-9.
