= Yanrakynnot =

Yanrakynnot Янракыннот
- Selo
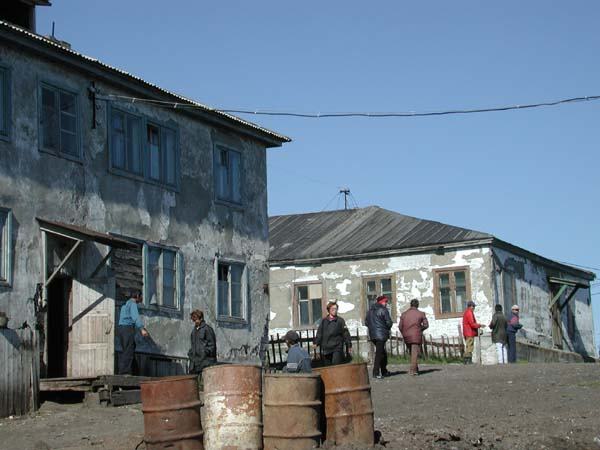
- View of Yanrakynnot
- Interactive map of Yanrakynnot
- Location of Yanrakynnot Yanrakynnot (Chukotka Autonomous Okrug)
- Coordinates: 64°54′00″N 172°31′59″W
- Country: Russia
- Federal subject: Chukotka Autonomous Okrug
- Administrative district: Providensky District

Population (2010 Census)
  - Total: 338
  - Estimate (January 2016): 298 (−11.8%)

Municipal status
  - Municipal district: Providensky Municipal District
  - Rural settlement: Yanrakynnot Rural Settlement
  - Capital of: Yanrakynnot Rural Settlement
- Time zone: UTC+12 (MSK+9)
- Postal code: 689271
- Dialing code: +7 42735
- OKTMO ID: 77710000126

Yanrakynnot (Russian: Янракыннот) is a rural locality (a selo) in Providensky District of Chukotka Autonomous Okrug, Russia. Population: 338 (2010 census); Municipally, Yanrakynnot is a part of Yanrakynnot Rural Settlement in Providensky Municipal District.

== Etymology ==
Its name is derived from the Chukchi word for "detached, firm land", although other sources translate it as "the lonely stand", and others still say it means "hard place".

== History ==
Like many of the small rural localities in Chukotka, the amenities of Yanrakynnot were affected by the dissolution of the Soviet Union; the eight-grade school, for example, was downgraded to just a four-grade school.

== Geography ==
Yanrakynnot is located on the shores of the Venetken (lit. "curved") lagoon, linked to the administrative center of the district, the urban-type settlement of Provideniya, by an 80-kilometer (50 mi) unpaved road.

== Demographics ==
The population according to the most recent census data is 338, of whom 185 were male and 153 female, a slight increase on a 2008 estimate of 330.

== Economy ==
Yanrakynnot is a traditional Chukchi locality, with the economy being dominated by whaling. The locality also serves as a base for those wishing to visit Whale Bone Alley on Yttygran Island or Arakamchechen Island.

== Climate ==
Yanrakynnot has a tundra climate (Köppen climate classification ET) because the warmest month has an average temperature between 0 °C (32 °F) and 10 °C (50 °F).

Climate data for Yanrakynnot
Month	Jan	Feb	Mar	Apr	May	Jun	Jul	Aug	Sep	Oct	Nov	Dec	Year
Mean daily maximum °C (°F)	−11.4 (11.5)	−13.2 (8.2)	−11.6 (11.1)	−6.1 (21.0)	1.2 (34.2)	7.1 (44.8)	10.6 (51.1)	10.3 (50.5)	6.4 (43.5)	0.6 (33.1)	−4.5 (23.9)	−10.6 (12.9)	−1.8 (28.8)
Daily mean °C (°F)	−14.9 (5.2)	−16.7 (1.9)	−15.5 (4.1)	−10.0 (14.0)	−1.6 (29.1)	4.0 (39.2)	7.7 (45.9)	7.7 (45.9)	4.1 (39.4)	−1.5 (29.3)	−7.2 (19.0)	−13.8 (7.2)	−4.8 (23.3)
Mean daily minimum °C (°F)	−18.3 (−0.9)	−20.2 (−4.4)	−19.3 (−2.7)	−13.8 (7.2)	−4.3 (24.3)	0.9 (33.6)	4.8 (40.6)	5.1 (41.2)	1.9 (35.4)	−3.5 (25.7)	−9.9 (14.2)	−17.0 (1.4)	−7.8 (18.0)
Average precipitation mm (inches)	36 (1.4)	26 (1.0)	24 (0.9)	26 (1.0)	21 (0.8)	26 (1.0)	49 (1.9)	66 (2.6)	54 (2.1)	54 (2.1)	53 (2.1)	43 (1.7)	478 (18.6)

== Gallery ==
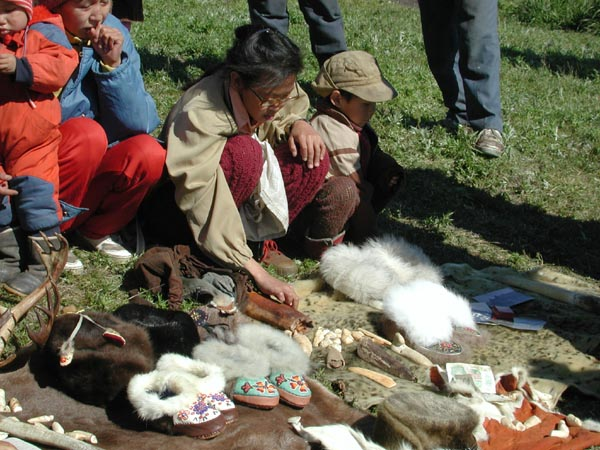
Market in Yanrakynnot

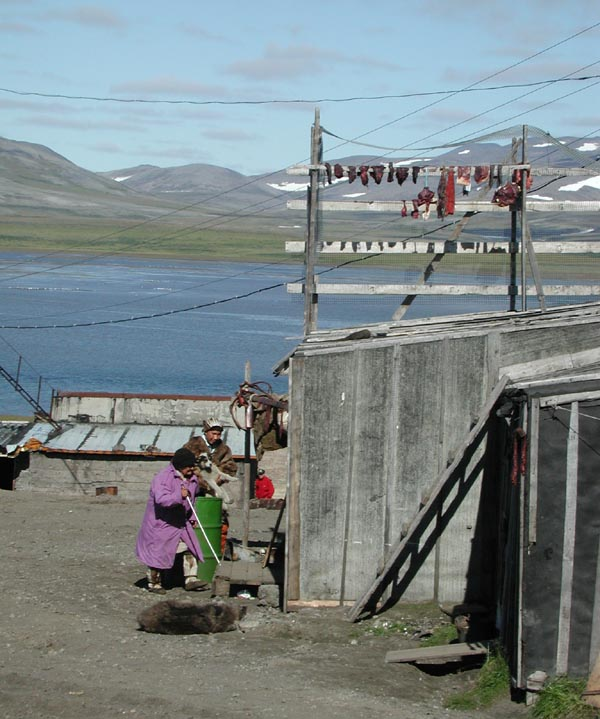
Meat drying outside

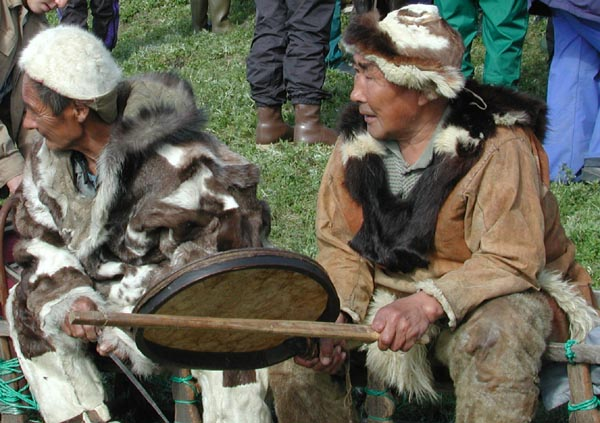
Elder men playing sealskin drum

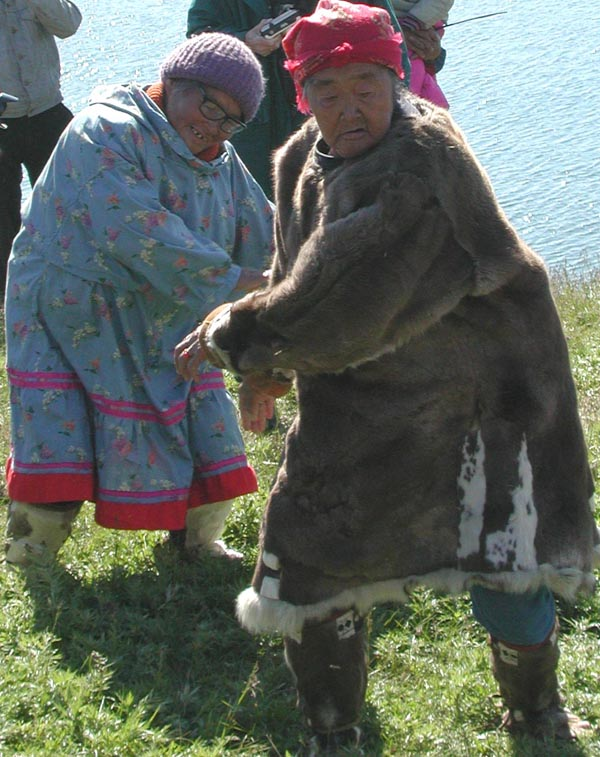
Two elder ladies dancing

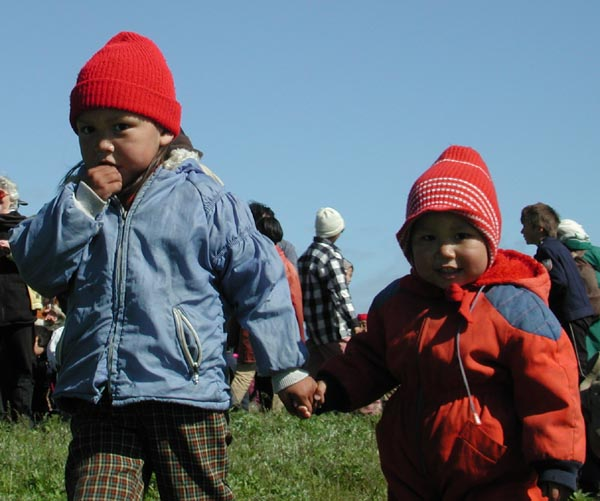
Two children

== See also ==
- List of inhabited localities in Providensky District
