= Yttygran Island =

Island in the Bering Sea

Yttygran
Итыгран / Siklyuk
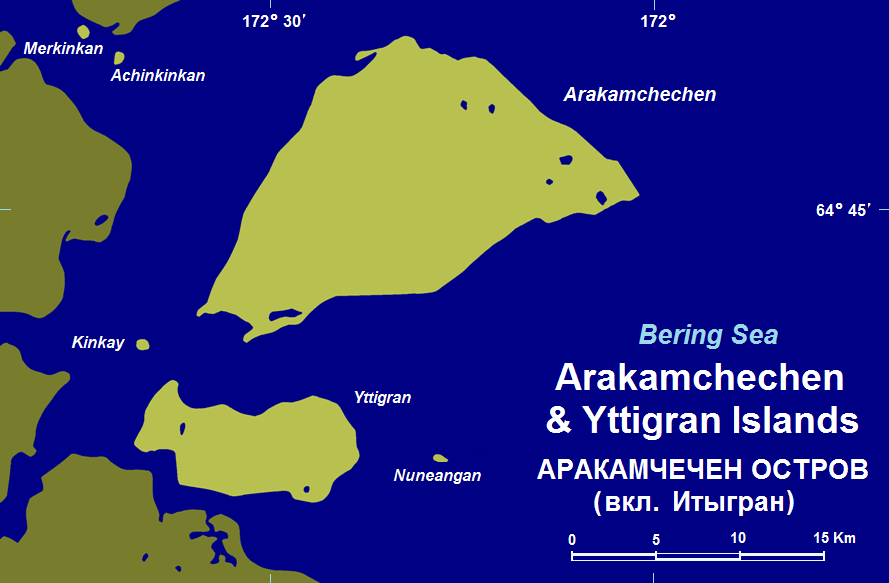
- Arakamchechen and Yttygran Islands

- Location within Russia Location within Chukotka Autonomous Okrug

Geography
- Location: Bering Sea
- Coordinates: 64°35′N 172°27′W
- Area: 55 km^{2} (21 sq mi)
- Length: 13.5 km (8.39 mi)
- Width: 5 km (3.1 mi)
- Highest elevation: 545 m (1788 ft)

Administration
- Russian Federation
- Federal subject: Chukotka

Demographics
- Population: 0

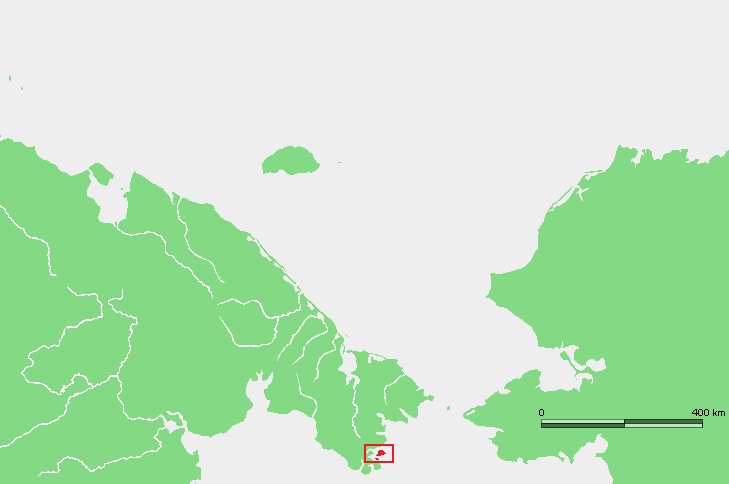
Location of Yttygran and neighboring Arakamchechen Island in Chukotka.

Yttygran Island (Russian: Итыгран; Eskimo–Aleut: Siklyuk) is an island in the Bering Sea 24 kilometres (15 miles) northwest of Cape Chaplino, close to the coast of Chukotka.

Nowadays this island is popular with ecotourists. Beluga whales are common in the waters around Yttigran and neighbouring Arakamchechen islands.

== Geography ==
Yttygran is located 3.8 kilometres (2.4 miles) to the south of Arakamchechen Island and is separated from the continental shore by a sound that is only 1.5 kilometres (0.9 miles) in its narrowest point. Penkigney Bay lies to the NW of the island.

Yttigran is 13.5 kilometres (8.4 miles) long and has a maximum width of 5 kilometres (3.1 miles). It has a mountainous interior.

== Administration ==
Administratively Yttygran Island belongs to Providensky District, part the Chukotka Autonomous Okrug of the Russian Federation.

== Whale Bone Alley ==
Situated on the northern shore of Yttygran island (from the Chukchi Etgyran, meaning "midway dwellings"), Whale Bone Alley consists of a large number of carefully arranged whale skulls, whale bones and stones, along with a considerable number of meat storage pits. It is thought that Whale Bone Alley was used as a central shrine by a number of different villages dotted along the eastern Chukotkan coast. It is thought that the site was used for initiation rituals and for sporting contests, although the local Yupik have a simpler explanation that the island was simply a collective centre for the flensing, butchery and storage of whale meat, an idea supported by the etymology of the Yupik name for Yttygran: Sikliuk, from Siklyugak, meaning "meat pit" in Yupik.

The site is monumental by Chukotkan standards when compared with other early settlements such as Uelen, Ekven, Sireniki and Kivak, and consists of several lines of whale skulls and jaw bones along the shoreline, several large pits behind them and a number of meat pits surrounding a central sanctuary and stone path around one third of the way along the site travelling from south to north.

The site extends some 1800 feet (548 metres) along the northern coast of Yttygran Island and lies on a major whale migration path, and it is thought that the site was chosen partly because of the ease by which local people could kill and butcher a whale and also as a place where people could come together and trade on neutral ground in a forerunner to the fairs held during the period of cossack exploration of the region.

There is no evidence of any monumental ritual centre like this elsewhere in any other part of Eskimo lands, though there are sites along the Chukotkan coast where the whale skull motifs can be seen at sites such as Nykhsirak.

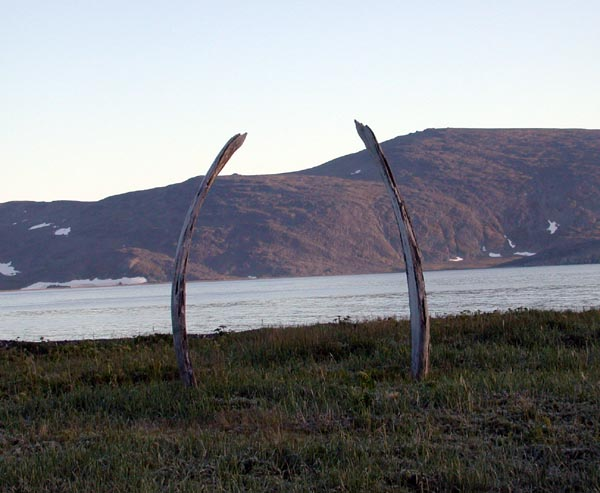
Ceremonial whale ribs, Whale Bone Alley.

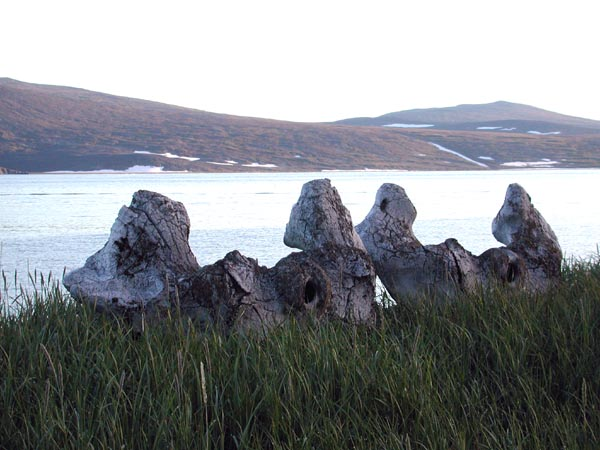
Whale bones, Whale Bone Alley.

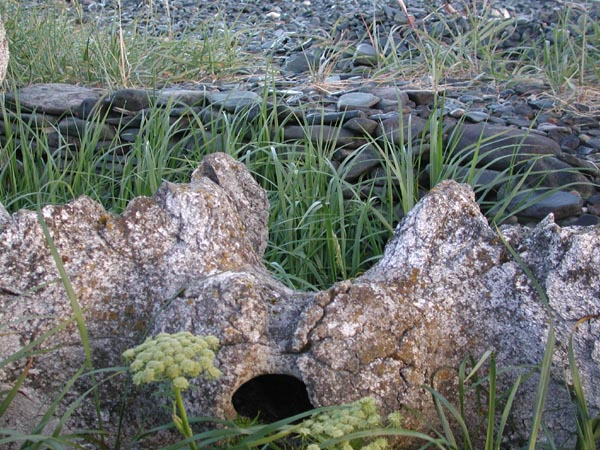
Meat storage pit, Whale Bone Alley.
