= Sireniks =

Extinct Siberian language

Sirenik Yupik: сиӷы́ныгмы̄́ӷий

Regions with significant populations
- Sireniki, Russia

Languages
- Siberian Yupik, Russian, formerly Sirenik

Religion
- formerly shamanism

Sirenik or Sireniki (Sirenik Yupik: сиӷы́ныгмы̄́ӷий Sirenik Yupik pronunciation: [siˈʁənəɣˈməːʁij]) are an Eskaleut-speaking ethnic group of Chukotka Autonomous Okrug and former speakers of a divergent Eskimo-Aleut language in Siberia, before its extinction in 1997. The total language death of this language means that now the cultural identity of Sirenik Yupik is maintained through other aspects: slight dialectal difference in the adopted Siberian Yupik language; sense of place, including appreciation of the antiquity of their settlement Sirenik.

== Location ==
At the beginning of the 20th century, speakers of the Sirenik language inhabited the settlements of Sirenik, Imtuk, and some small villages stretching to the west from Sirenik along south-eastern coasts of the Chukchi Peninsula. As early as in 1895, Imtuk was already a settlement with mixed population of Sirenik Yupik and Ungazigmit (the latter belonging to Siberian Yupik).

== Language ==
The Yupik population of settlement of Сиреники (Sireniki, plural of Sirenik) formerly spoke an Eskaleut language with several unique traits. For example, dual number is not known in Sirenik, while most Eskimo–Aleut languages have dual, including the neighboring Siberian Yupik relatives. These differences amounted to mutual unintelligibility with Siberian Yupik and the Sirenik language's nearest language relatives. The language is now extinct.

Language differences (even from its neighboring Yupik relatives) meant Sirenik Yupik had to speak either Siberian Yupik or Chukchi, an unrelated language, to communicate with the neighboring (linguistically related) Siberian Yupik. These were distinct, mutually unintelligible languages.

The linguistic classification of Sirenik language is still under debate. It is sometimes regarded as a third branch of Eskimo (along with Inuit and Yupik), but is also sometimes classified as a Yupik language.

The last native speaker of Sirenik, Vyie (Valentina Wye) (Russian: Выйе) died in January 1997. Thus, the language is extinct, and today Sirenik Yupik speak Siberian Yupik language and/or Russian.

== History ==
Little is known about Sirineki history, besides some conjectures based on linguistical consideration. Sirenik Yupik culture has been influenced by that of Chukchi (witnessed also by folktale motifs).

=== Location ===
Sireniki is an old settlement; it has existed at least for 2500 years. It is the only Yupik village in Siberia that has not been relocated, even during the assimilation policy. This fact is a part of establishing recent cultural identity of Sireniki Yupik.

=== Diachronic linguistics ===
Little is known about the history of the Sirenik language. The uniqueness of the Sirenik language may be the result of a supposed long isolation from other Inuit and Yupik groups, and contact with speakers of unrelated languages for many centuries. Influence by Chukchi language is clear.

There are evidences that this small language had at least two territorial dialects in the past, although the number of its speakers was very few even at the end of the nineteenth century.

== Cultural identity ==
The total language death of the Sirenik language means that now the cultural identity of Sirenik Yupik is maintained through other aspects:

- Some of these factors are still of linguistic nature. Although during the language shift the language of Ungazigmit (a dialect of the Siberian Yupik language) has been adopted, they speak it with some variation, making a dialect.
- Younger generations do not speak any Eskaleut language (neither that of Ungazigmit), they speak Russian. But the cultural identity is maintained not only through linguistic factors, there is also a "sense of place" concerning their village. Sirenik is the only Eskaleut settlement in Siberia that has not been relocated, thus it has preserved its 2500-year-long anciency.

The cultural identity of other ethnic groups living in Sirenik settlement has been researched as well.

== Spiritual culture ==
At one time, traditional spiritual practices were prohibited by authorities, still, some knowledge about these ways survived. The last shaman in Sireniki died around 1990. Since then there has been no shaman in the village. Scholars observed shamanic practices among the Sireniki in the early 20th century. A folklore tale text mentions a feast that could possibly include shamanic features.

=== Folklore ===
==== Animals ====
In their folklore, we can find the motif of the benevolent spider:

- In many tales, the spider saves the protagonist from peril with its cobweb, capable of lifting the endangered hero up to the sky. The same motif is present also in Siberian Yupik folklore.
- The spider is a benevolent creature also in another Sirenik tale, where she (personified as an old woman) desires the gift of eternal life for people: old age followed by rejuvenation. In this question, the spider is standing in debate with the beetle: the latter proposes, that human life should end in death.

Also some other animals can be presented in folklore as helpers of people: loon, fox, wolf, mouse, deer. As for malevolent powers, devils (/tunʁaki/) belong to such dangers, they can feature in the shape of human, animal or fantastic beings. As mentioned, beetle can be presented as malevolent for people. Folklore can feature man fighting with a big worm.

==== Space and time ====
Mythology of this culture can reveal some beliefs about time and space.

===== Temporal dilation motif =====
There is a motif in some Paleoasiatic cultures: wandering people, after a long absence, observe that they have remained young compared to their children who remained at home. Sirenik people have such a tale as well: the protagonist, returning home after a long travel, must face with the fact that his son has become an old man (while he himself remained young).

More familiar examples of folklore from the world presenting such kind of temporal dilation motifs: Urashima Taro and (without remaining young) Rip Van Winkle.

==== Celestial motifs ====
Another tale presents the sky as an upper world where people can get to and return from, and experience adventures there: communicate with people living there, kill a big worm, observe the earth from up there through a hole, descend back to the earth.

==== Magic ====
Several Inuit and Yupik peoples had beliefs in usage of amulets, formulae (spells, charms). Furthermore, several peoples living in more or less isolated groups (including many Inuit and Yupik ones) understand natural phenomena on a personal level: there are imagined beings resembling to human but differing as well. As for Sirenik people, in one of their tales, we find the motif of the effective calling of natural phenomena for help in danger: an eagle is pursuing people on the ice, and a woman begins to talk about calling wind and frost, then at once the river freezes in, and the eagle freezes onto the ice.

==== Some tale examples ====
Only their short summaries follow. Quotation marks refer not to literate citation, they just separate remarks from tale summaries.

===== Cormorants =====
An animal tale, taking place on a cliff near the so-called fast-ice edge, narrating a conflict between a cormorant and a raven family. The raven wants to steal and eat a child of the a cormorant pair by deceit, but one of the cormorants notices the trick and turns it against the raven so that the robber eats its own child unknowing.

===== Yari =====
The sample of a loon's cry is just an illustration. It is not linked to any ethnographic record, it is only of ethological relevance.

This tale shows Chukchi people influence, moreover, it may be a direct borrowing. It is an example of the "[domesticated] reindeer" genre, presenting conflicts among different groups for seizing reindeer herds. The tale features also magical animal helpers (the wolf and the diver).

A man lived together with his daughter, Yari. Yari had also a little brother. They had many reindeer, and Yari herded them. One day, strangers took all the reindeer, together with Yari. The father remained alone with the little boy, and they fell upon the parish. The boy became a hunter. One day, a wolf waited for him, the beast recommended him to find out whether they had to own ever any reindeer. the origin of their poverty from the father. The boy followed the council, but his father denied the past, claiming that they have never had any domestic animal and they have always lived from wild deer. Soon, the boy, while hunting, met a diver waiting especially for him, and the bird gave him the same council as the wolf, but the father denied the truth again. Both animals revealed the boy the truth and promised him that they help him to retrieve the reindeer herd. They had a long way. First the boy rode the running wolf, then he rode the flying diver. They found the strangers who kept their former reindeer herd, and also the sister of the boy, Yari. The diver made rain with its cry, and the wolf called the reindeer together, the boy managed to speak to Yari, and all they began to return home, together with the herd. The strangers noticed that by have been beaten in a battle. The boy and the girl returned home with the two helper animals and the herd. The family of the boy and that of the wolf established reciprocal intermarriage link. The father of the boy felt joy upon their return, but he died later. The wolf helped to herd the reindeer regularly, and the family helped the diver to hatch her eggs in safety.

===== Cousins =====
Two brothers live together. The older has a son, the younger has a daughter. The two cousins lie together in secret. The parents notice that and regard it such a shame that they lie in ambush and kill the boy. The girl preserves his skull. Later the parents notice that the girl and the skull can keep conversation. They abandon the girl by deceit and move to another place. The girl remains alone, but the skull asks her to throw him into fire in a special way. After this, the skull reincarnates into his former form. Moreover, they get a large reindeer herd in a magical way. The parents visit them, but the young refuse even to notice them, the girl refuses to forgive. The parents return to the place they have moved to, and commit suicide.

A Chukchi tale contains almost the same series of motifs (except for the incest and the infanticide at the beginning). The Chukchi tale begins with the girl's finding a skull incidentally. Besides that, in the Chukchi tale, the girl, just after having been abandoned by her parents, begins to accuse the skull and push it with her feet rudely. And on the visit of her returning parents, she seemingly forgives them, but kills them by deceit.

A related tale has been collected also among Ungazighmiit (belonging to Siberian Yupik). Like the Sirenik variant, also the Ungazighmii one begins with the incest of cousins and the following infanticide, but it is the father of the girl who wants to kill his own daughter, and the father of the boy persuades him to kill the boy instead. At the end of the tale, the girl shows no sign of revenge, and it is the boy who initiates something that petrifies the parents (literally).

===== Man with two wives =====
The author mentions the time dilation motif (mentioned above), present among several Paleoasian peoples. The text of the tale itself does not contain a direct mentioning of time dilation caused by travel or absence: the protagonist's remaining young seems to be rather the result of a bless, spoken by the old man the protagonist has saved.

A man lived with two wives. He left his home and went into the sea. He came to the land of ringed seals, he remained there for a night and slept there with two women. The other they, he left and came to the land of other marine animals, where the same story repeated. Finally, he came to a land, where he was accepted as a guest at an old man's family. The guest liberated the old man's family from their enemies. The old man spoke aloud: "From now on, the boy be young and strong and remain strong!". the man returned home finally, and indeed, he found that his own son had become an old man during his absence, moreover, the old son died at the very moment of the return of his father.

===== Man =====
The same or similar motifs can be found also among Ungazigmit, moreover, an Ungazigmi tale extends the story with the further life of the girl after having been pulled up to the sky by the benevolent spider.

A father insults his daughter because she refuses to marry anybody. The affronted girl leaves him. After a hard wandering of her, two men (a brother pair) catches her and keeps her as a sister. While the men hunt, a malevolent being [the beetle, as mentioned above] deceits her and eats her brain. The brothers, returning from hunt, try to save her by implanting the brain of a domesticated deer and the brain of a wild deer in place of her robbed brain. The girl heals, but soon changes into a deer. The elder brother finds an old woman living inside a hill, and gets her help to find the deer-girl: the deer has wandered far away, and joined a herd there, far, "beyond sunrise". The man, using the advice of the old woman, finds the herd, and, by cutting up the female deer, the girl steps out of the body in her former human form. They return home. Soon, the elder brother visits the hill again to present the old woman a killed deer in gratitude, meanwhile the younger brother begins to touch and grasp the girl in the absence of the elder brother. The girl, while defending herself, kills the man. [The Siberian Yupik variants of this motif emphasize that it is an unintended accident.] Of fright, the girl hides the corpse, but the elder brother discovers it incidentally and prepares a plan to kill the girl. A benevolent being [the spider, as mentioned above] reveals the plan to the girl: the man wants to call the girl to keep a ritual for the abundance of game, and during the pretended "ritual", he wants to push the girl into a pit full of carnivorous worms. Really, everything happens so, but in the critical moment, the spider saves the pushed-in girl by pulling her up with its cobweb. The older brother, having seen this revulsion, despairs and jumps into the pit himself.

=== Taboo ===
Like several other Inuit and Yupik groups, the inhabitants of Sirenik had beliefs prohibiting certain activities, that were thought to be disadvantageous in a magical way. Carrying an uncovered drum on the street was thought to trigger stormy weather. Bad weather was the supposed effect of burning seaweed on campfire, too. A great deal of the taboos (like several other beliefs) were thought to serve chances of survival and sustenance, securing abundance of game. Several of them restricted the exploitation of resources (game).

=== Shamanism ===
Like Yupik and Inuit cultures themselves, examples of shamanism among Inuit and Yupik peoples can be diverse.

During the Stalinist and post-Stalinist periods, shamanism was prohibited by authorities. Nevertheless, some knowledge about shamanistic practices survived. The last shaman in Sirenik died before 2000, and since then there has been no shaman in the village. Earlier in the 20th century, shamanistic practices could be observed by scholars in Sirenik, and also a folklore text mentions a feast that could include shamanistic features.

== Recent history and today ==
The Sirenik people maintain traditional subsistence skills, such as building large skin boats similar to the angyapik among Siberian Yupik, and umiak among many other Inuit and Yupik peoples.

Poverty, unemployment, and alcoholism challenge their community. Medical care and supplies to the settlement can be inadequate.
