= Nunligran =

Nunligran Нунлигран Нунлыгран (Chukchi)
- Selo

Other transcription(s)
  - Chukchi: Нунлыгран
- Interactive map of Nunligran
- Location of Nunligran Nunligran (Chukotka Autonomous Okrug)
- Coordinates: 64°47′54″N 175°22′37″W
- Country: Russia
- Federal subject: Chukotka Autonomous Okrug
- Administrative district: Providensky District

Population (2010 Census)
  - Total: 360
  - Estimate (January 2016): 297 (−17.5%)

Municipal status
  - Municipal district: Providensky Municipal District
  - Rural settlement: Nunligran Rural Settlement
  - Capital of: Nunligran Rural Settlement
- Time zone: UTC+12 (MSK+9)
- Postal code: 689274
- Dialing code: +7 42735
- OKTMO ID: 77710000111

Nunligran (Russian: Нунлигран; Chukot: Нунлыгран, Nunlygran) is a village (selo) in Providensky Municipal District of Chukotka Autonomous Okrug, in the Far Eastern Federal District of Russia. Population: 360 (2010 census); Municipally, Nunligran is subordinated to Chukotsky Municipal District and incorporated as Nunligran Rural Settlement.

== Geography ==
The settlement, about 180 km from Provideniya, is a Chukchi village that replaced a Yupik village, Indeed, the name is derived from a combination of the two languages: "Nunalyk", the Yupik for "having a village" and "Ran", the Chukchi word for "Dwelling". It is not clear whether the Chukchi gradually became the dominant race in the village or whether they forced the Yupik out.

The village is situated located nearly 20 km (12 mi) to the west of the shore of the Achchyon lagoon, separated from the Bering Sea by a sandy spit.

== Demographics ==
As of 2010 Nunligran had a population of 360, of whom 191 were male and 169 female. This was a slight reduction on a 2006 estimate of 370.

== Culture ==
The state Chukchi–Yupik ensemble "Ergyron" (lit. "Sunrise" in Chukchi) composed a song entitled Nunligran.

== Climate ==
Nunligran has a Tundra climate (ET) because the warmest month has an average temperature between 0 °C (32 °F) and 10 °C (50 °F).

Climate data for Nunligran
Month	Jan	Feb	Mar	Apr	May	Jun	Jul	Aug	Sep	Oct	Nov	Dec	Year
Record high °C (°F)	3 (37)	7 (45)	3 (37)	6 (43)	14 (57)	22 (72)	23.9 (75.0)	22.2 (72.0)	19.1 (66.4)	8 (46)	6.1 (43.0)	4.4 (39.9)	23.9 (75.0)
Mean daily maximum °C (°F)	−11.1 (12.0)	−12.1 (10.2)	−9.1 (15.6)	−5.1 (22.8)	2.4 (36.3)	8.1 (46.6)	11.9 (53.4)	11.2 (52.2)	6.9 (44.4)	0.4 (32.7)	−5.6 (21.9)	−9.6 (14.7)	−1 (30)
Mean daily minimum °C (°F)	−15.5 (4.1)	−17.5 (0.5)	−15.6 (3.9)	−11.6 (11.1)	−2.2 (28.0)	2.5 (36.5)	6.2 (43.2)	6.1 (43.0)	2.4 (36.3)	−2.9 (26.8)	−9.2 (15.4)	−13.7 (7.3)	−5.9 (21.4)
Record low °C (°F)	−39.1 (−38.4)	−33.7 (−28.7)	−32.3 (−26.1)	−27.3 (−17.1)	−17 (1)	−4.1 (24.6)	1.7 (35.1)	−1 (30)	−5.6 (21.9)	−16.8 (1.8)	−25.7 (−14.3)	−30.4 (−22.7)	−39.1 (−38.4)
Average rainfall mm (inches)	48 (1.9)	36 (1.4)	30 (1.2)	33 (1.3)	30 (1.2)	36 (1.4)	54 (2.1)	81 (3.2)	81 (3.2)	60 (2.4)	75 (3.0)	60 (2.4)	624 (24.6)
Average snowy days	18	14	14	19	13	2	0	0	3	16	16	19	134

== See also ==
- List of inhabited localities in Providensky District
