= Cape Bering =

Cape in the Chukotka Autonomous Okrug, Russia

Coordinates: 65°00′05″N 175°53′10″W

Cape Bering (Russian: Мыс Беринга) is a cape on the southwest coast of the Chukchi Peninsula, washed by Bering Sea in the Providensky District of the Chukotka Autonomous Okrug in Russia.

Enmelen (lit. "craggy" in Chukchi) is situated near Cape Bering.
