= Medvezhye (Chukotka Autonomous Okrug) =

Lake of Chukotka Autonomous Okrug

- Медвежье
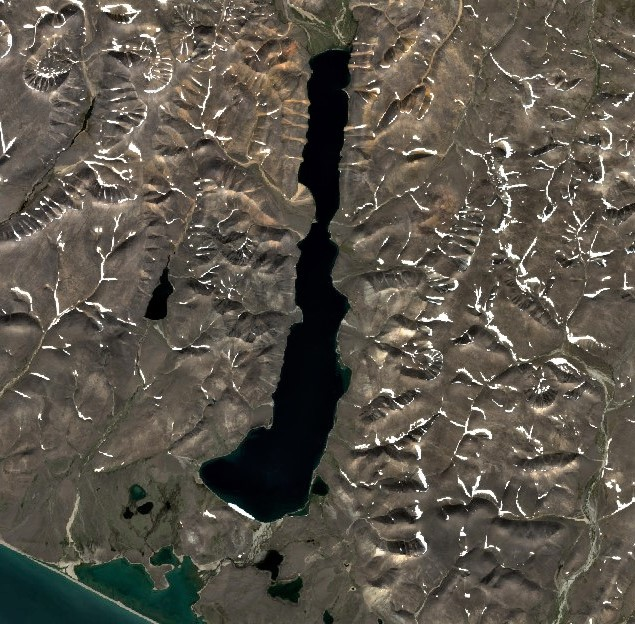
- Sentinel-2 image of the lake

- Location in Chukotka Autonomous Okrug, Russian Far East
- Location: Chukotka Autonomous Okrug
- Coordinates: 65°36′58″N 176°24′45″W
- Primary inflows: Unnamed
- Primary outflows: Unnamed
- Basin countries: Russia
- Max. length: 15.3 km (9.5 mi)
- Max. width: 3.1 km (1.9 mi)
- Surface area: 24 km^{2} (9.3 sq mi)
- Islands: None

Medvezhye (Russian: Медвежье), also known as Mezhgornoye (Russian: Межгорное), is a lake in Providensky District, Chukotka Autonomous Okrug, Russian Federation.

There are no permanent settlements on the shores of the lake. The nearest inhabited place is Enmelen, located 40 km (25 mi) to the southeast.

== Geography ==
Medvezhye is located in the Chukotka Peninsula, 90 km (56 mi) east of Kresta Bay, close to the Gulf of Anadyr of the Bering Sea. It is a long and narrow lake that lies at the southeastern end of the Chukotka Mountains. The lake fills a valley oriented from north to south bound by mountains on either side. Its southern end is separated from a coastal lagoon by a 2 km (1.2 mi) to 3 km (1.9 mi) wide strip of land.

Lake Medvezhye freezes in early October and stays under ice until mid-June.

== See also ==
- List of lakes of Russia
