= Pychgynmygytgyn =

Lake of Chukotka Autonomous Okrug

- Пычгынмыгытгын / Пэчгэнмыгытгын
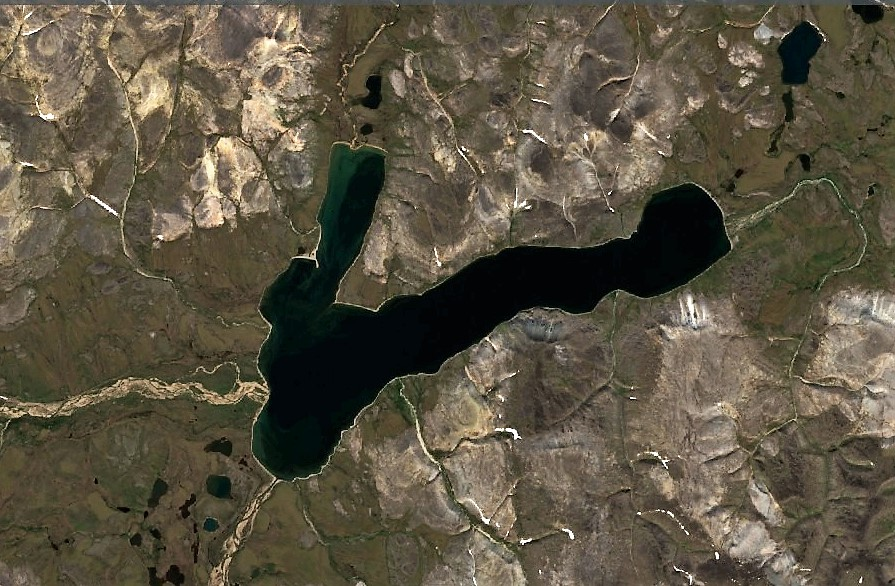
- Lake Pychgynmygytgyn Sentinel-2 image

- Location in Chukotka Autonomous Okrug, Russian Far East
- Location: Chukotka Autonomous Okrug
- Coordinates: 66°12′12″N 175°41′46″W
- Type: Oligotrophic
- Primary inflows: Eetikit
- Primary outflows: Kevyanvyveem
- Catchment area: 366 km^{2} (141 sq mi)
- Basin countries: Russia
- Max. length: 8 km (5.0 mi)
- Max. width: 2.4 km (1.5 mi)
- Surface area: 13.1 km^{2} (5.1 sq mi)
- Surface elevation: 110 m (360 ft)
- Islands: None

Pychgynmygytgyn (Russian: Пычгынмыгытгын or Пичхинмыитхын; Chukot: Пэчгэнмыгытгын) is a freshwater lake in Providensky District, Chukotka Autonomous Okrug, Russian Federation. It has an area of 13.1 km^{2} (5.1 sq mi).

There are no permanent settlements on the shores of the lake. The nearest inhabited place is Nutepelmen, located 97 km (60 mi) to the NNE.

The name of the lake in Chukot means "a lake near a rock where food was obtained."

== Geography ==
Pychgynmygytgyn is located in the Chukotka Peninsula, 55 km (34 mi) southwest of Kolyuchin Bay. It is a V-shaped lake that lies in a wide intermontane basin of the central part of the Chukotka Mountains.

River Eetikit flows into the western lakeshore and the 38 km (24 mi) long Kevyanvyveem flows out of Pychgynmygytgyn from the south.

The lake freezes in the first half of September and stays under ice until June.

== Flora and fauna ==
Pychgynmygytgyn is surrounded by tundra. Arctic char is common in the lake. The Taranets char is also found in its waters.

== See also ==
- List of lakes of Russia
