= Achchyon =

Lake of Chukotka Autonomous Okrug

- Аччён / А’чон / Асун
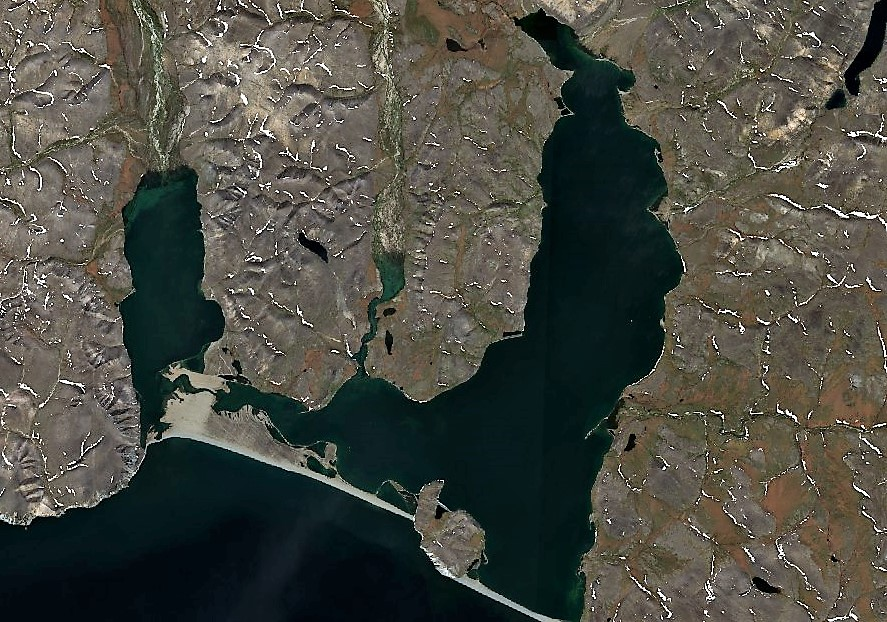
- Sentinel-2 image of the lake in June

- Location in Chukotka Autonomous Okrug, Russian Far East
- Location: Chukotka Autonomous Okrug
- Coordinates: 64°48′27″N 174°40′58″W
- Type: Coastal lagoon
- Primary inflows: Ergytgyn, Likvylenveem, Kuyulvayam and Keperveem
- Basin countries: Russia
- Max. length: 19.8 km (12.3 mi)
- Max. width: 10.5 km (6.5 mi)
- Surface area: 91 km^{2} (35 sq mi)
- Max. depth: 27 m (89 ft)
- Shore length^{1}: 85 km (53 mi)
- Islands: None
- ^{1} Shore length is not a well-defined measure.

Achchyon (Russian: Аччён; Chukot: А’чон; Central Siberian Yupik: Асун), is a lake in Providensky District, Chukotka Autonomous Okrug, Russian Federation.

There are archaeological remains of a Siberian Yupik settlement by the lakeshore. Currently there is no permanent human habitation on the shores of the lake. The nearest inhabited place is Nunligran village, located nearly 20 km (12 mi) to the west. The name of the lake in Chukot means "pink salmon."

== Geography ==
Achchyon is a coastal lagoon located in the Chukotka Peninsula, at the southeastern end of the Chukotka Mountains. Its southern end is separated from Anadyr Bay by a narrow landspit. The water is clear and the lake bottom is pebbly and sandy.

The lake freezes in early October and stays under ice until mid-June. The salinity of the waters is variable. During severe storms in the Bering Sea, the waves break over the landspit and large amounts of seawater spill into the lake. However, there are four rivers —Ergytgyn, Likvylenveem, Kuyulvayam and Keperveem, as well as fourteen unnamed streams that flow into Achchyon. They contribute to greatly reduce the average salinity of the lake.

== Fauna ==
Sockeye salmon, pink salmon, Chinook salmon, Arctic char, taranets char and vendace are common in the waters of the lake. Achchyon used to be an important place for industrial-scale fisheries in the region. In the 1950s, salmon production reached 50 metric tons, but catches have plummeted since the end of the 20th century. Achchyon includes a 1,980 ha (4,900 acres) protected area since 1975.

== See also ==
- List of lakes of Russia
