= Arakamchechen Island =

Russian island in the Bering Sea

Arakamchechen
Аракамчечен / Kigini
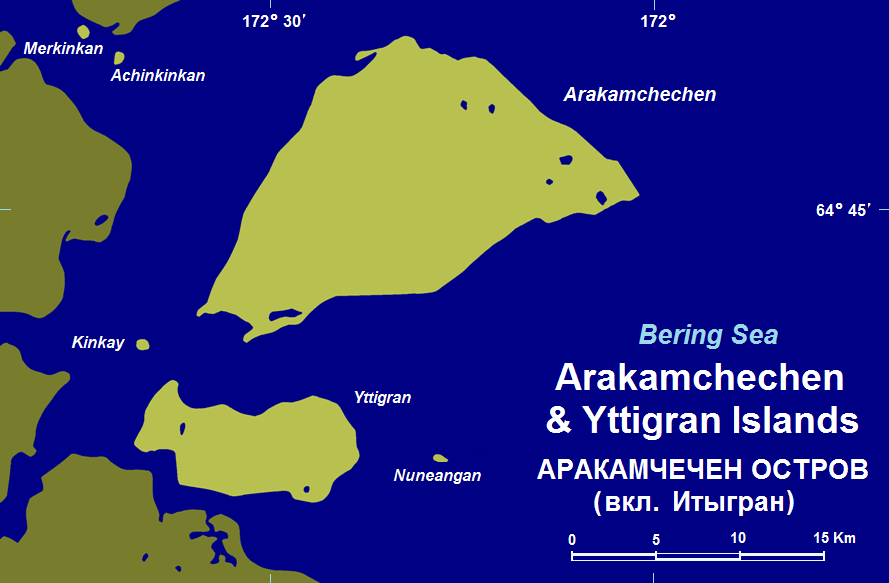
- Arakamchechen and Yttygran Islands

- Location within Russia

Geography
- Location: Bering Sea
- Coordinates: 64°45′N 172°23′W
- Area: 276.8 km^{2} (106.9 sq mi)
- Length: 32 km (19.9 mi)
- Width: 21 km (13 mi)
- Highest elevation: 613 m (2011 ft)

Administration
- Russian Federation
- Federal subject: Chukotka

Demographics
- Population: 0

Arakamchechen Island (Russian: Аракамчечен; Eskimo–Aleut: Kigini) is an island in the Bering Sea.

== Geography ==
Arakamchechen lies north of Cape Chaplino, close to the coast of Chukotka. It is separated from the continental shore by an 8 km wide sound. This island is inhabited; the main settlement is Yanrakynnot village.

Arakamchechen Island is 32 km long and has a maximum width of 21 km. It has a mountainous interior. South of it lies Yttygran Island and west of it Penkigney Bay. There is a 5 km wide sound between the two islands.

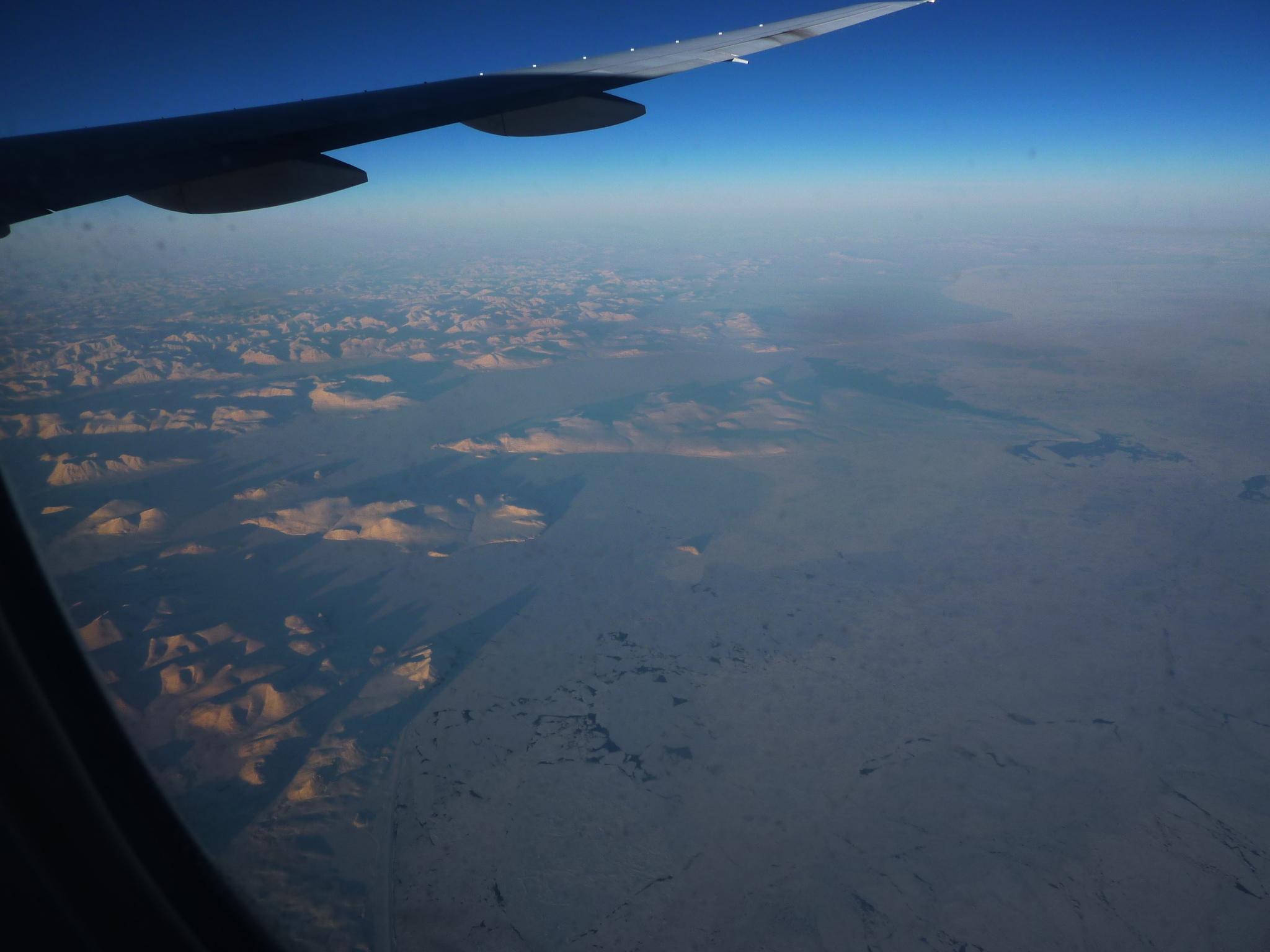
Arakamchechen (above the center of the photo) and the smaller Yttygran (left of center). The tiny island to the south of Arakamchechen is Nuneangan.

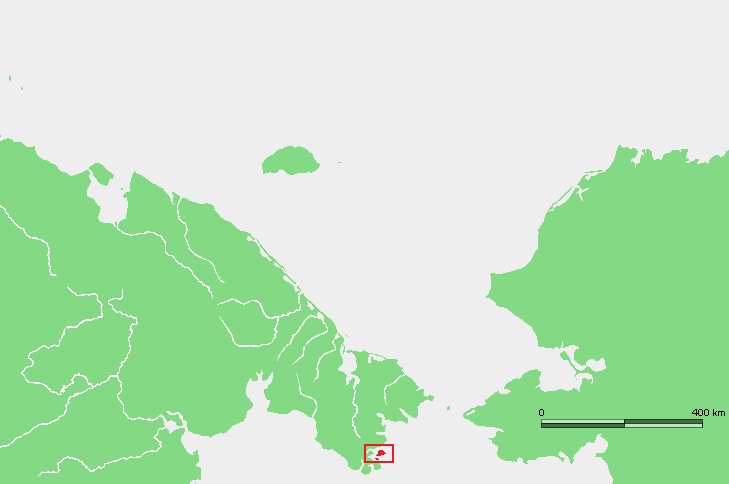
Location of Arakamchechen Island in Chukotka

== Administration ==
Administratively Arakamchechen Island belongs to the Chukotka Autonomous Okrug of the Russian Federation.

Nowadays this island is popular with tourists who come to enjoy the wildlife. Many walruses live in rookeries in the shores of this island.
