= Salvelinus taranetzi =

Conservation status
- Least Concern (IUCN 3.1)

Scientific classification
- Kingdom: Animalia
- Phylum: Chordata
- Class: Actinopterygii
- Order: Salmoniformes
- Family: Salmonidae
- Genus: Salvelinus
- Species: S. taranetzi

Binomial name
- Salvelinus taranetzi Kaganowsky, 1955

Species of fish

Salvelinus taranetzi, also known as the Taranets char, is a species of salmonid fish native to Chukotka, Northeast Russia.

== Distribution ==
This char lives in glacier lakes and river basins of Chukotka, Russian Far East, where it may adapt to extremely severe conditions. It may be found both in fresh and brackish waters between the Kolyma River and the Bering Sea, including the Rauchua (Bilibino District), the Chaun Bay rivers (Chaun District), Pegtymel River, Amguema River, Vankarem River and Kymyneyveem River (Iultinsky District), as well as the rivers of the Kolyuchin Bay, Chegitun River, Uttyveem River and Koolenvaam River, the Saint Lawrence Bay, Mechigmen Bay, Getlyangen, Lake Achchyon, Nunyamovaam and Erguveem (Providensky District) and Seutakan, Chelkun and Ioniveyem River. Kresta Bay (Iultinsky District), the Anadyr basin (Anadyr District) and the rivers with mouths on the coast south of Anadyr.
