= Novoye Chaplino =

Novoye Chaplino Новое Чаплино
- Selo
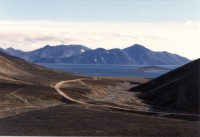
- Road to Novoye Chaplino
- Interactive map of Novoye Chaplino
- Location of Novoye Chaplino Novoye Chaplino (Chukotka Autonomous Okrug)
- Coordinates: 64°29′54″N 172°51′42″W
- Country: Russia
- Federal subject: Chukotka Autonomous Okrug
- Administrative district: Providensky District
- Founded: 1958

Population (2010 Census)
  - Total: 419
  - Estimate (January 2016): 362 (−13.6%)

Municipal status
  - Municipal district: Providensky Municipal District
  - Urban settlement: Provideniya Urban Settlement
- Time zone: UTC+12 (MSK+9)
- Postal code: 689272
- Dialing code: +7 42735
- OKTMO ID: 77710000106

Novoye Chaplino (Russian: Новое Чаплино, Siberian Yupik: Ungaziq) is a village (selo) in Providensky District of Chukotka Autonomous Okrug, in the Far Eastern Federal District of Russia. Population: 419 (2010 census); Municipally, Novoye Chaplino is subordinated to Providensky Municipal District. In 2010, a law was passed abolishing the municipal rural settlement of Novoye Chaplino. The village continues to exist, but is now municipally part of Providenia Urban Settlement.

== History ==
=== Origins ===
The village was founded in 1960, although some sources state that it was founded in 1958 as a result of the merging of several nearby coastal villages into one. Villages such as Unazik (lit "Bewhiskered" in Yupik and formerly an important local whaling centre), Kivak (lit. "Green Glade" in Yupik and the site of an ancient settlement several thousand years old) and Plover, as well as settlements from much further up the coast such as the now abandoned village of Naukan.

=== Post-Soviet history ===
Novoye Chaplino is a good example of how following the collapse of the Soviet Union, the outflow of Russian migrants allowed indigenous people to take up senior administrative posts in the local administration. In a similar situation to other Chukotkan villages such as Markovo, During Soviet times, about 25% of the population of the village were non-indigenous in-comers. Despite being in the minority, they formed the majority of senior employees in areas such as the state farm, village administration and technical services. In-comers also dominated senior positions at the school including the principal, boarding-school supervisore, administrative director, bookkeeper and 11 out of the 18 licensed teachers.

Following the collapse of the Soviet Union, indigenous people managed to gain more influence in their key local services. By 1995, in-comer departure was almost complete. Whereas over 110 people out of a population of 460 were non-indigenous in 1986, barely 30 remained nine years later, and those were mostly married to indigenous villagers. Although the economic situation meant that a number of local industries had closed or had truncated staff numbers, in the state farm, three-quarters of the top officials were indigenous people and over two-thirds (of the admittedly smaller) school were either Chukchi or Yupik.

=== Recent history ===
On September 10, 2010, a law was passed abolishing Novoye Chaplino and Sireniki at municipal level. Novoye Chaplino as an entity continues to exist, but it is no longer a rural settlement on its own, but simply an inhabited locality within Provideniya urban settlement. The right of the village to local administration was removed and such responsibilities were taken over by Provideniya municipal administration on January 1, 2011. Provideniya municipal administration also took control of all municipal property, all municipal property rights and all local budgets on this date.

== Demographics ==
The population according to the most recent census data, prior to the abolition of the rural settlement was 419, of whom 206 were male and 213 female. This represents a significant increase on a 2008 estimate of about 330, but is flat against a 2003 estimate of 422, more than 90% of which were Chukchi or Siberian Yupik.

== Culture and economy ==
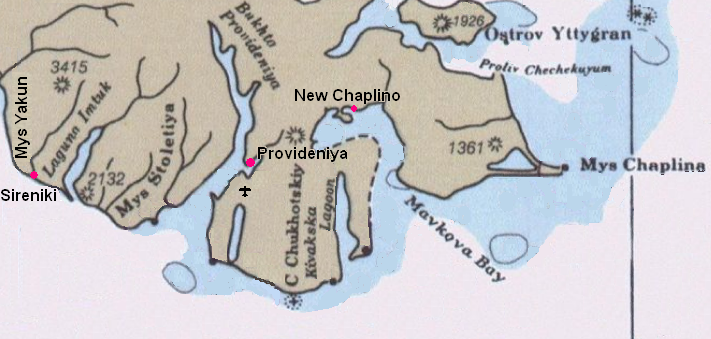
Provideniya, Provideniya Bay, and surrounding area

The village is populated mainly by Yupik, and whaling is the main source of employment in the area.

The Chaplino hot-springs are an important local attraction. There are other springs near the former village of Kivak, but these are less popular due to their isolation.

== Climate ==
Novoye Chaplino has a Tundra climate (ET) because the warmest month has an average temperature between 0 °C (32 °F) and 10 °C (50 °F).

Climate data for Novoye Chaplino
| Month | Jan | Feb | Mar | Apr | May | Jun | Jul | Aug | Sep | Oct | Nov | Dec | Year |
|---|---|---|---|---|---|---|---|---|---|---|---|---|---|
| Record high °C (°F) | 3 (37) | 7 (45) | 3 (37) | 6 (43) | 14 (57) | 22 (72) | 23.9 (75.0) | 22.2 (72.0) | 19.1 (66.4) | 8 (46) | 6.1 (43.0) | 4.4 (39.9) | 23.9 (75.0) |
| Mean daily maximum °C (°F) | −11.1 (12.0) | −12.1 (10.2) | −9.1 (15.6) | −5.1 (22.8) | 2.4 (36.3) | 8.1 (46.6) | 11.9 (53.4) | 11.2 (52.2) | 6.9 (44.4) | 0.4 (32.7) | −5.6 (21.9) | −9.6 (14.7) | −1 (30) |
| Mean daily minimum °C (°F) | −15.5 (4.1) | −17.5 (0.5) | −15.6 (3.9) | −11.6 (11.1) | −2.2 (28.0) | 2.5 (36.5) | 6.2 (43.2) | 6.1 (43.0) | 2.4 (36.3) | −2.9 (26.8) | −9.2 (15.4) | −13.7 (7.3) | −5.9 (21.4) |
| Record low °C (°F) | −39.1 (−38.4) | −33.7 (−28.7) | −32.3 (−26.1) | −27.3 (−17.1) | −17 (1) | −4.1 (24.6) | 1.7 (35.1) | −1 (30) | −5.6 (21.9) | −16.8 (1.8) | −25.7 (−14.3) | −30.4 (−22.7) | −39.1 (−38.4) |
| Average rainfall mm (inches) | 48 (1.9) | 36 (1.4) | 30 (1.2) | 33 (1.3) | 30 (1.2) | 36 (1.4) | 54 (2.1) | 81 (3.2) | 81 (3.2) | 60 (2.4) | 75 (3.0) | 60 (2.4) | 624 (24.6) |
| Average snowy days | 18 | 14 | 14 | 19 | 13 | 2 | 0 | 0 | 3 | 16 | 16 | 19 | 134 |

== See also ==
- List of inhabited localities in Providensky District
