= Enmelen =

Enmelen Энмелен Энмыԓьын (Chukchi)
- Selo
- Interactive map of Enmelen
- Location of Enmelen Enmelen (Chukotka Autonomous Okrug)
- Coordinates: 65°00′N 175°51′W
- Country: Russia
- Federal subject: Chukotka Autonomous Okrug
- Administrative district: Providensky District

Population (2010 Census)
  - Total: 367
  - Estimate (January 2016): 299 (−18.5%)

Municipal status
  - Municipal district: Providensky Municipal District
  - Rural settlement: Enmelen Rural Settlement
  - Capital of: Enmelen Rural Settlement
- Time zone: UTC+12 (MSK+9)
- Postal code: 689272
- Dialing code: +7 42735
- OKTMO ID: 77710000121

Enmelen (Russian: Энмелен; Chukchi: Энмыԓьын, romanized: Enmyḷ’yn; Yupik: Ынмылин, romanized: Ynmylin) is a village (selo) in Providensky District of Chukotka Autonomous Okrug, in the Far Eastern Federal District of Russia. Population: 367 (2010 census); Municipally, Enmelen is subordinated to Providensky Municipal District and incorporated as Enmelen Rural Settlement.

== Geography ==
Enmelen (lit. "craggy" in Chukchi) is situated near Cape Bering well over 200 km from Provideniya. The settlement is not connected by road to any other places. It is populated by a mixture of Chukchi and Yupik and near the village is the site of an ancient Yupik settlement.

== Demographics ==
The population according to the most recent census data was 367, of whom 188 were male and 179 female, a slight decrease on a 2006 estimate of 390.

== Economy ==
The village is supported by a combination of reindeer herding and the hunting of sea mammals.

== Climate ==
Enmelen has an arctic climate (Köppen climate classification ET) with very cold, long winters and cool, short summers.

Climate data for Enmelen
Month	Jan	Feb	Mar	Apr	May	Jun	Jul	Aug	Sep	Oct	Nov	Dec	Year
Mean daily maximum °C (°F)	−12.0 (10.4)	−14.7 (5.5)	−12.7 (9.1)	−7.3 (18.9)	0.7 (33.3)	7.3 (45.1)	10.9 (51.6)	10.1 (50.2)	5.8 (42.4)	−0.9 (30.4)	−6.7 (19.9)	−12.1 (10.2)	−2.6 (27.2)
Daily mean °C (°F)	−15.6 (3.9)	−18.2 (−0.8)	−16.5 (2.3)	−11.2 (11.8)	−2.2 (28.0)	4.2 (39.6)	7.8 (46.0)	7.4 (45.3)	3.5 (38.3)	−3.3 (26.1)	−9.4 (15.1)	−15.3 (4.5)	−5.7 (21.7)
Mean daily minimum °C (°F)	−19.2 (−2.6)	−21.6 (−6.9)	−20.2 (−4.4)	−15.1 (4.8)	−5.1 (22.8)	1.1 (34.0)	4.8 (40.6)	4.8 (40.6)	1.3 (34.3)	−5.6 (21.9)	−12.1 (10.2)	−18.5 (−1.3)	−8.8 (16.2)
Average precipitation mm (inches)	43 (1.7)	30 (1.2)	22 (0.9)	24 (0.9)	22 (0.9)	33 (1.3)	57 (2.2)	65 (2.6)	56 (2.2)	52 (2.0)	58 (2.3)	44 (1.7)	506 (19.9)

== See also ==
- List of inhabited localities in Providensky District
