= Central Siberian Yupik language =

Endangered Yupik language spoken by the Siberian Yupik people near the Bering Strait

Central Siberian Yupik
- St. Lawrence Island Yupik
- Akuzipik, Yupigestun, Юпик
- Native to: United States, Russia
- Region: Chukchi Peninsula (Chukotka, Russia), Bering Strait region, St. Lawrence Island
- Ethnicity: 2,828 Siberian Yupiks
- Native speakers: • 400–750 in United States • 172–1,200 in Russia (with Chaplino dialect) (2021)
- Language family: Eskaleut: Eskimo; Yupik; Central Siberian Yupik
- Early forms: Proto-Eskimo–Aleut: Proto-Eskimo; Proto-Yupik
- Dialects: Chaplino Yupik; St. Lawrence Island Yupik
- Writing system: Latin, Cyrillic

Official status
- Official language in: Russia: Chukotka (in Chukchi Peninsula); United States: Alaska

Language codes
- ISO 639-3: ess
- Glottolog: cent2128 Central Siberian Yupik
- ELP: Central Siberian Yupik
- Yupik settlements around the Bering Strait. The Siberian Yupik settlements are indicated with red dots.

- Central Siberian Yupik is classified as Definitely Endangered by the UNESCO Atlas of the World's Languages in Danger.

Central Siberian Yupik (also known as Akuzipik, Yupigestun, and St. Lawrence Island Yupik, is an endangered Yupik language spoken by the Indigenous Siberian Yupik people along the coast of Chukotka in the Russian Far East and in the villages of Savoonga and Gambell on St. Lawrence Island. The language is part of the Eskimo–Aleut language family.

In the United States, the Alaska Native Language Center identified about 400–750 Yupigestun speakers, considering "dormant speakers" who understand but cannot converse. In Russia in 2021, 172 people indicated that they speak the language, while only 92 of them use it in everyday life. Thus, the total number of speakers is no more than 550–900 people.

== Dialects and subgroups ==
Siberian Yupik has two dialects: Chaplino (Chaplinski) Yupik (Uŋazigmit) is spoken on the shores of Chukotka Autonomous Okrug in the Russian Far North, and St. Lawrence Island Yupik (Sivuqaghmiistun) is spoken on St. Lawrence Island, Alaska.

Chaplino, or Uŋazigmit, is the largest Yupik language of Siberia (the second one is Naukan Yupik), and is named after the settlement of Уӈазиӄ (Ungaziq; Chaplino or Old Chaplino in Russian). The word Ungazighmii / Уңазиӷмӣ [uŋaʑiʁmiː] (plural Ungazighmiit / Уңазиӷмӣт [uŋaʑiʁmiːt]) means "Ungaziq inhabitant(s)". People speaking this language live in several settlements in the southeastern Chukchi Peninsula (including Novoye Chaplino, Provideniya, and Sireniki), Uelkal, Wrangel Island, and Anadyr. The majority of Chaplino Yupik speakers live in the villages of Novoye Chaplino and Sireniki. In another terminology, these people speak Chaplino, and Ungazighmiit people speak one of its dialects, along with other dialects spoken by Avatmit, Imtugmit, Kigwagmit, which can be divided further into even smaller dialects.

The second dialect, St. Lawrence Island Yupik, is believed to be an offspring of Chaplino with only minor phonetic, phonological, morphological, syntactical and lexical differences, and the two dialects are virtually identical.

== Phonology ==
=== Consonants ===
Unlike the Central Alaskan Yupik languages, Siberian Yupik has a series of retroflex fricatives, more similar to the Alaskan Inuit dialects.

		Labial	Alveolar	Retroflex	Palatal	Velar		Uvular		Glottal
		Labial	Alveolar	Retroflex	Palatal	plain	lab.	plain	lab.	Glottal
Nasal	voiceless	m̥	n̥			ŋ̊	ŋ̊ʷ			
Nasal	voiced	m	n			ŋ	ŋʷ			
Stop		p	t			k	kʷ	q	qʷ	
Fricative	voiceless	f	s	ʂ		x	xʷ	χ	χʷ	h
Fricative	voiced	v	z	ʐ		ɣ	ɣʷ	ʁ	ʁʷ	
Fricative	lateral		ɬ							
Approximant			l		j					

=== Vowels ===
	Front	Central	Back
Close	i		u
Mid		ə	
Open		a	

== Morphosyntax ==
Morphosyntax is the study of grammatical categories or linguistic units that have both morphological and syntactic properties. Central Siberian Yupik’s structure most resembles this category. In addition, CSY can be described as using both internal and external syntax. Internal syntax is used here to describe the way that postbases are added to a base or added to one another, contrasted with external syntax, which refers to the order of independent words.

Central Siberian Yupik is a polysynthetic language, meaning it is made up of long, structured words containing many separate meaningful parts (morphemes). In fact, a single word can be an entire sentence. CSY is also an ergative-absolutive language, in contrast to the nominative-accusative structure of English and many Indo-European languages.

Most Siberian Yupik words consist of a "base" or "stem", followed by zero or more "postbases", followed by one "ending", followed by zero or more "enclitics":

angyagh- -ghllag- -nge- -yug- -tuq -llu
boat big acquire want 3SG-PRES also
stem postbase postbase postbase ending enclitic
"Also, he/she wants to acquire a big boat."

Generally, the "base" or "stem" contains the root meaning of the word, while the "postbases", which are suffixing morphemes, provide additional components of the sentence (see example above). As shown, postbases include items with adjectival and verbal qualities, among other elements. The "ending" (Woodbury’s term) is an inflectional suffix to the right of the postbase that contains grammatical information such as number, person, case, or mood. Enclitics are bound suffixes that follow the inflectional ending of a word. An attached enclitic affects the meaning of the entire sentence, not just the element to which it is attached. The exception is the enclitic ‘llu,’ shown above, which has a basic meaning of ‘and.’

=== Bases ===
The base forms the lexical core of the word and belongs to one of three main classes: noun bases, verb bases and particle bases.

- Noun bases (N)
  - Ordinary noun bases (intransitive, transitive)
  - Independent pronoun bases (intransitive)
  - Demonstrative bases (D) (intransitive)
  - Adjectival noun bases
    - Inflecting as ordinary noun bases (intransitive, transitive)
    - Independent relative bases
    - Quantificational bases (Q)
      - Numeral (NM) bases: cardinal (intransitive); ordinal (transitive)
      - Specifier (SP) bases: cardinal (intransitive); partitive (transitive)
  - Locational bases
    - Demonstrative adverb (DA) bases (intransitive)
    - Positional (PS) bases (transitive)
  - Temporal bases
    - Temporal noun bases (intransitive, transitive)
    - Temporal particle bases
- Verb bases (V)
  - Exclusively intransitive (Vi)
  - Exclusively transitive (Vt)
  - Ambivalent
- Particles
  - Independent particles
  - Sentence particles
  - Phrasal participles
  - Enclitics

Noun endings indicate number (singular, dual, or plural), case, and whether or not the noun is possessed. If the noun is possessed, the ending indicates the number and person of the possessor. Siberian Yupik has seven noun cases:

1. absolutive
2. relative (ergative-genitive)
3. ablative-modalis
4. localis
5. terminalis
6. vialis
7. aequalis

=== Absolutive case noun endings ===
As in other ergative-absolutive languages, absolutive case is used to mark nouns that are generally the subjects of intransitive verbs or the objects of transitive verbs.

		Singular Noun	Plural Noun	Dual Noun
Unpossessed		Ø	-t	-k
1st person possessor	singular	-ka	-nka	-gka
1st person possessor	plural	-put	-put	-gput
1st person possessor	dual	-pung	-pung	-gpung
2nd person possessor	singular	-n	-ten	-gken
2nd person possessor	plural	-si	-si	-gsi
2nd person possessor	dual	-tek	-tek	-gtek
3rd person possessor	singular	-a	-i	-kek
3rd person possessor	plural	-at	-it	-gket
3rd person possessor	dual	-ak	-ik	-gkek
3rd person reflective possessor	singular	-ni	-ni	-gni
3rd person reflective possessor	plural	-teng	-teng	-gteng
3rd person reflective possessor	dual	-tek	-tek	-gtek

=== Relative/ergative case noun endings ===
Ergative case identifies nouns as a subject of a transitive verb and acts as the genitive form in ergative-absolutive languages.

		Singular Noun	Plural Noun	Dual Noun
Unpossessed		-m	-t	-k
1st person possessor	singular	-ma	-ma	-gma
1st person possessor	plural	-mta	-mta	-gemta
1st person possessor	dual	-mtung	-mtung	-gemtung
2nd person possessor	singular	-gpek	-gpek	-gpek
2nd person possessor	plural	-gpesi	-gpesi	-gpesi
2nd person possessor	dual	-gpetek	-gpetek	-gpetek
3rd person possessor	singular	-an	-in	-gkenka
3rd person possessor	plural	-ita	-ita	-gkenka
3rd person possessor	dual	-ita	-ita	-gkenka
3rd person reflective possessor	singular	-mi	-mi	-gmi
3rd person reflective possessor	plural	-meng	-meng	-gmeng
3rd person reflective possessor	dual	-meng	-meng	-gmeng

=== Ablative-modalis case noun endings ===
The ablative case is used to indicate the agent in passive sentences, or the instrument, manner, or place of the action described by the verb.

		Single Noun	Plural Noun	Dual Noun
Unpossessed		-meng	-neng	-gneng
1st person possessor	singular	-mneng	-mneng	-gemneng
1st person possessor	plural	-mnneng	-mnneng	-gemneng
1st person possessor	dual	-mtegneng	-mtegneng	-gemtegneng
2nd person possessor	singular	-gpe(g)neng	-gpe(g)neng	-gpe(g)neng
2nd person possessor	plural	-gpesineng	-gpesineng	-gpesineng
2nd person possessor	dual	-gpetegneng	-gpetegneng	-gpetegneng
3rd person possessor	singular	-aneng	-ineng	-gkeneng
3rd person possessor	plural	-itneng	-itneng	-itneng
3rd person possessor	dual	-gkeneng	-itneng	-itneng
3rd person reflective possessor	singular	-mineng	-mineng	-gmineng
3rd person reflective possessor	plural	-meggneng	-meggneng	-gmeggneng
3rd person reflective possessor	dual	-meg(te)neng	-meg(te)neng	-gmeg(te)neng

The endings of the locative and terminative cases are the same as those of the ablative case except that the locative case has -mi and -ni and the terminative case has -mun and -nun in place of the -meng and -neng at the end of the ablative case endings.

=== Prolative case noun endings ===
In grammar, the prolative case, also called the vialis case, is a grammatical case of a noun or pronoun that expresses motion by the referent of the noun it marks.

		Singular Noun	Plural Noun	Dual Noun
Unpossessed		-kun	-tgun	-gnekun
1st person possessor	singular	-mkun	-mkun	-gemkun
1st person possessor	plural	-mteggun	-mteggun	-gemteggun
1st person possessor	dual	-mtegnegun	-mtegnegun	-gemtegnegun
2nd person possessor	singular	-gpegun	-gpegun	-gpegun
2nd person possessor	plural	-gpesigun	-gpesigun	-gpesigun
2nd person possessor	dual	-gpetegnegun	-gpetegnegun	-gpetegnegun
3rd person possessor	singular	-akun	-ikun	-gkenkun
3rd person possessor	plural	-itgun	-itgun	-itgun
3rd person possessor	dual	-gkenkun	-itgun	-itgun
3rd person reflective possessor	singular	-mikun	-mikun	-gmikun
3rd person reflective possessor	plural	-megteggun	-megteggun	-gmegteggun
3rd person reflective possessor	dual	-megtegnegun	-megtegnegun	-gmegtegnegun

=== Equative noun case endings ===
Equative is a case that expresses the standard of comparison of equal values.

		Singular Noun	Plural Noun	Dual Noun
Unpossessed		-tun	-stun	-gestun
1st person possessor	singular	-mtun	-mtun	-gemtun
1st person possessor	plural	-mtestun	-mtestun	-gemtestun
1st person possessor	dual	-mtegestun	-mtegestun	-gemtegestun
2nd person possessor	singular	-gpetun	-gpetun	-gpetun
2nd person possessor	plural	-gpesistun	-gpesistun	-gpesistun
2nd person possessor	dual	-gpetegetun	-gpetegetun	-gpetegetun
3rd person possessor	singular	-atun	-itun	-gketun
3rd person possessor	plural	-itun	-itun	-itun
3rd person possessor	dual	-gketun	-itun	-itun
3rd person reflective possessor	singular	-mitun	-mitun	-gmitun
3rd person reflective possessor	plural	-megestun	-megestun	-gmegestun
3rd person reflective possessor	dual	-megestun	-megestun	-gmegestun

=== Postbases ===
Derivation is accomplished in CSY by attaching suffixes called postbases. Productivity in the context of CSY is defined as the free addition of a postbase to any base without an unpredictable semantic result; non-productivity implies that said postbases cannot combine freely but are limited to attaching to only a particular set of bases. Postbases are either nominal or verbal and select nominal or verbal bases or expanded bases to attach to (an expanded base is a base followed by one or more postbases). There are four kinds of postbases:

1. VN: postbases deriving nouns from verbs
2. NV: postbases deriving verbs from nouns
3. NN: postbases constructing complex nouns
4. VV: postbases constructing complex verbs

These postbases can indicate a wide variety of meaning, including:

For nouns:

- quantification,
- adjectival modification,
- being and becoming,
- a type of verbal noun-incorporation

For verbs:

- changes in transitivity,
- adverbial modification,
- evidentially,
- negation,
- tense,
- agent noun formation,
- relative clause formation,
- various types of verbal complementation

It is estimated that CSY has approximately 547 postbases: 75 NN, 55 NV, 30 VN, and 387 VV. It appears that in CSY the large majority of NN, NV, and VN postbases are productive; for the VV postbases, there are approximately 190 non-productive ones and 197 productive ones.

==== Characteristics of polysynthetic postbases ====
There are no clear morphological position classes in CSY. A position class is the organization of morphemes or a morpheme class into a linear ordering with no apparent connection to syntactic, semantic, or phonological representation. In the example below, it is semantic restrictions that dictate the order.

negh- -yaghtugh- -yug- -umaeat -yagh- -pete- -aa -llu
eat go.to.V want.to.V PST FRUSTR INFER IND.3S3S also
‘Also, it turns out she/he wanted to go eat it, but. . .’.

Some postbases can be used recursively, as in the example below.

itegh- -sqe- -yaghtugh- -sqe- -aa
come.in ask.to.V go.to.V ask.to.V IND.3S3S
‘He_{i} asked him_{j} to go ask himk to come in’.

Recursion can also be used for emphasis.

pinitun-(ngw/w)aagh-(ngs/w)aagh
really really well

There is variability in postbase ordering with no change in semantic outcome.

aane- -nanigh- -utke -aa
go.out cease.to.V V.on.account.of IND.3S3S
‘He ceased going out on account of it’.

aane- -utke- -nanigh- -aa
go.out V.on.account.of cease.to.V IND.3S3S
‘He ceased going out on account of it’.

Abbreviations: V, verb; PST, past tense; FRUSTR, frustrative (‘but . . ., in vain’); INFER, inferential evidential (often translatable as ‘it turns out’); INDIC, indicative; 3S3S, third-person subject acting on third-person object): (de Reuse 2006) Note: postbases noted in bold.

Note: there is a general rule in CSY of semantic scope in which the rightmost postbase will have scope over the left. However, there are many exceptions, as in the example above.

=== Enclitics ===
Following are a brief list and description of enclitics in CSY. The table is recreated from de Reuse (1988).

1. -lli: modal function, interrogative
2. -tuq: modal function, optative
3. -qa, -sa, -wha: modal function, exhortative or exclamative
4. -nguq: evidential function
5. -llu: focus marking or conjunction
6. -iii: can be interrogative; sometimes marks a perlocutionary act
7. -ta, -Vy: mark illocutionary acts
8. -ngam, -qun: mark the "presupposition that the hearer is unaware that the speaker lacks crucial information"
9. -mi: shifts the attention of the hearer

1st Position	2nd Position	3rd Position	4th position
-sa			-nguq
-ta			-nguq
-llu	-ngam	-tuq	-nguq
-llu	-qun		-nguq
-llu	-wha		-nguq
-llu	-lli		

Note: the ‘position’ references above refer to the position of the postbase following the main base.

== Other Eskimo languages spoken in Chukotka ==
=== Other Yupik languages ===
Naukan, or Nuvuqaghmiistun, the second largest Yupik language spoken in Chukotka, is spoken in settlements including Uelen, Lorino, Lavrentiya, and Provideniya.

=== Debated classifications ===
Additionally, the Sireniki Eskimo language, locally called Uqeghllistun, was an Eskimo language once spoken in Chukotka. It had many peculiarities. Sometimes it is classified as not belonging to the Yupik branch at all, thus forming (by itself) a stand-alone third branch of the Eskimo languages (alongside Inuit and Yupik). Its peculiarities may be the result of a supposed long isolation from other Eskimo groups in the past.

Sireniki became extinct in early January 1997.
