= Cape Chaplino =

Cape in the Chukotka Autonomous Okrug, Russian Federation

Cape Chaplin Мыс Чаплина; Angazik
- Cape
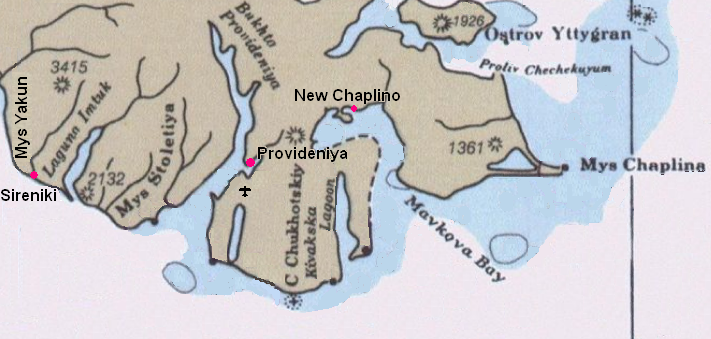
- Map of Cape Chaplin area

- Coordinates: 64°24′17″N 172°13′39″W
- Location: Chukotka, Russia
- Offshore water bodies: Chukchi Sea

Cape Chaplin or Cape Chaplino (Russian: Мыс Чаплина; Mys Chaplina; Eskimo–Aleut: Angazik) is a cape pointing eastward in the Bering Sea in the Chukotka Autonomous Okrug of the Russian Federation.

The area was first surveyed described and mapped by Russian mariner Count Fyodor Petrovich Litke during the First Kamchatka Expedition and it was named by Litke in honor of midshipman Peter Avraamovich Chaplin, a member of the expedition.

== Geography ==
This headland is located in an area of narrow beach ridges and swales which form a roughly triangular lagoon.

Cape Chaplino was the site of the Yupik village named Ungazik (Chaplino; Unisak on United States Coast and Geodetic Survey charts) which gave its name to the Chaplinski dialect of the Siberian Yupik language. The cape is shown as "Indian Point" on a USC&GS chart from 1897.

== Bibliography ==
- Reid, Anna (2002) The Shaman's Coat A Native history of Siberia Phoenix (Orion Books)London paperback edition 2003
