= Penkigney Bay =

Bay in Russia

- Пенкегней (Russian); Пэнкэнэй (Chukot)
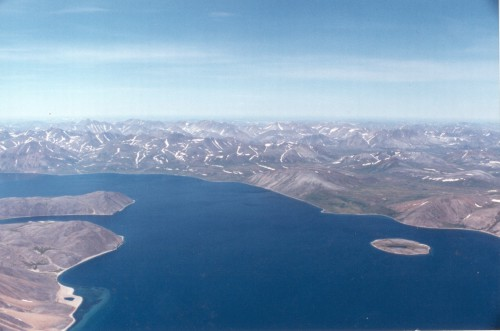
- View of Penkigney Bay from the east

- Location
- Location: Far North
- Coordinates: 64°49′N 172°49′W
- River sources: Kitlyaren, Pestsovaya
- Ocean/sea sources: Bering Sea
- Basin countries: Russia
- Max. length: 23 km (14 mi)
- Max. width: 4.8 km (3.0 mi)
- Average depth: 100 m (330 ft)

Penkigney Bay (Russian: Пенкегней, Penkegney; Chukot: Пэнкэнэй, Pènkènèj) is a bay of the Bering Sea on the eastern coast of the Chukotka Peninsula, Russian Federation. Administratively the bay is part of the Providensky District of Chukotka.

== Geography ==
Penkigney Bay is a fjord. The inner part of it stretches in a southwest/northeast direction for about 15 km and then it bends and opens towards the southeast for about 8 km until its mouth. It has an average width of about 4 km. There are two inlets and a coastal lagoon enclosed by a landspit inside the bay. Merkinkan and Achinkinkan are two small islands located at the entrance of the fjord on its northern side, and beyond the point on the southern side lies Alera Bay, a small cove. There are no permanent settlements in the shores of this bay.

== History ==
This bay was first surveyed described and mapped by midshipman Makar Ratmanov during the First Kamchatka Expedition in the autumn of 1828 led by Russian mariner Count Fyodor Petrovich Litke.

Penkigney bay was visited later in the 19th century by Adolf Erik Nordenskiöld during his Vega Expedition that made the Northeast Passage. Nordenskiöld called the bay "Konyam Bay":

Some days after we anchored in Konyam Bay (64 deg. 49' N.L., 172 deg. 53' W.L. from Greenwich). We found there only pure reindeer-owning Chukches; there was no coast population living by hunting and fishing.

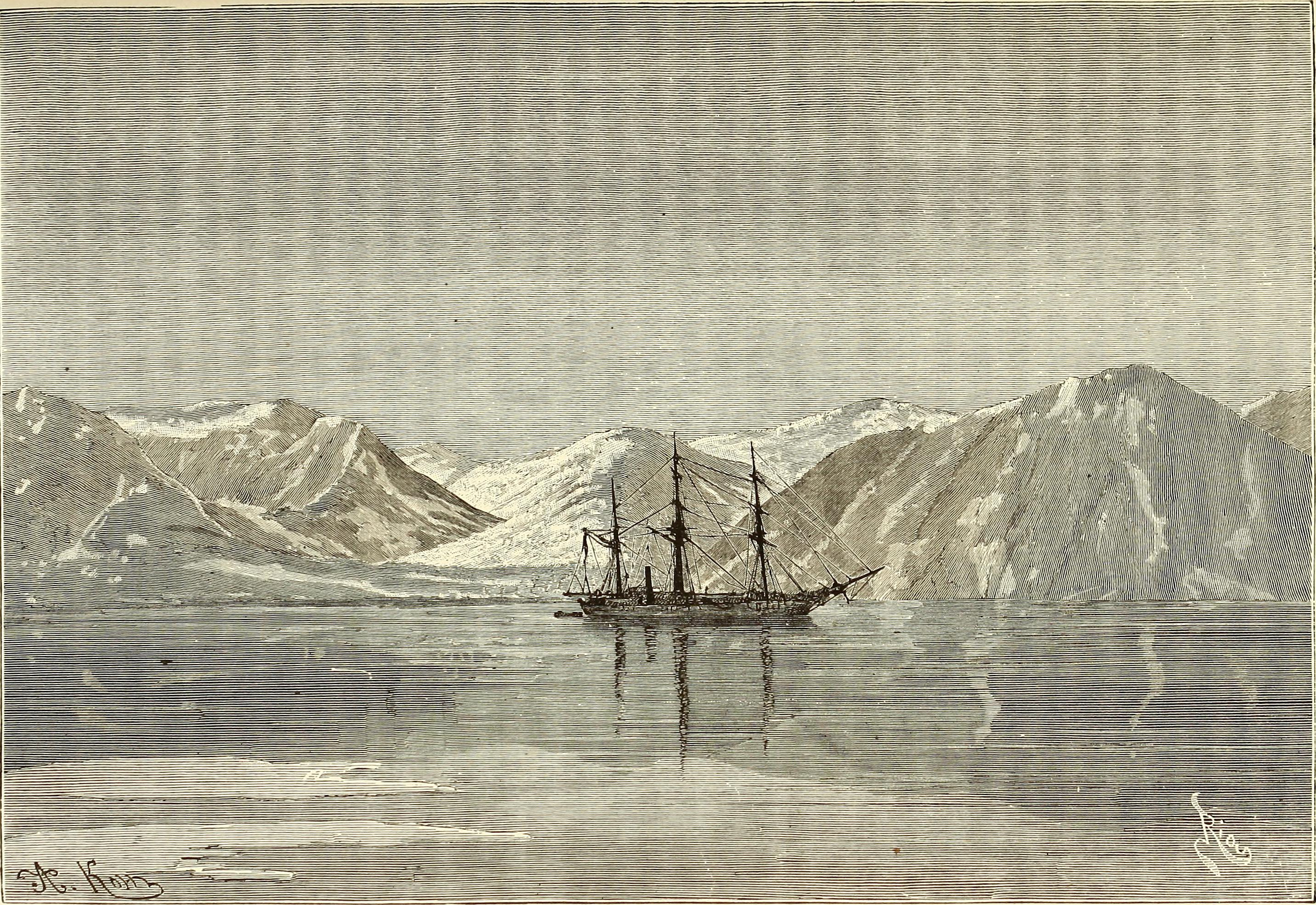
View of the SS Vega at anchor in Penkigney Bay.

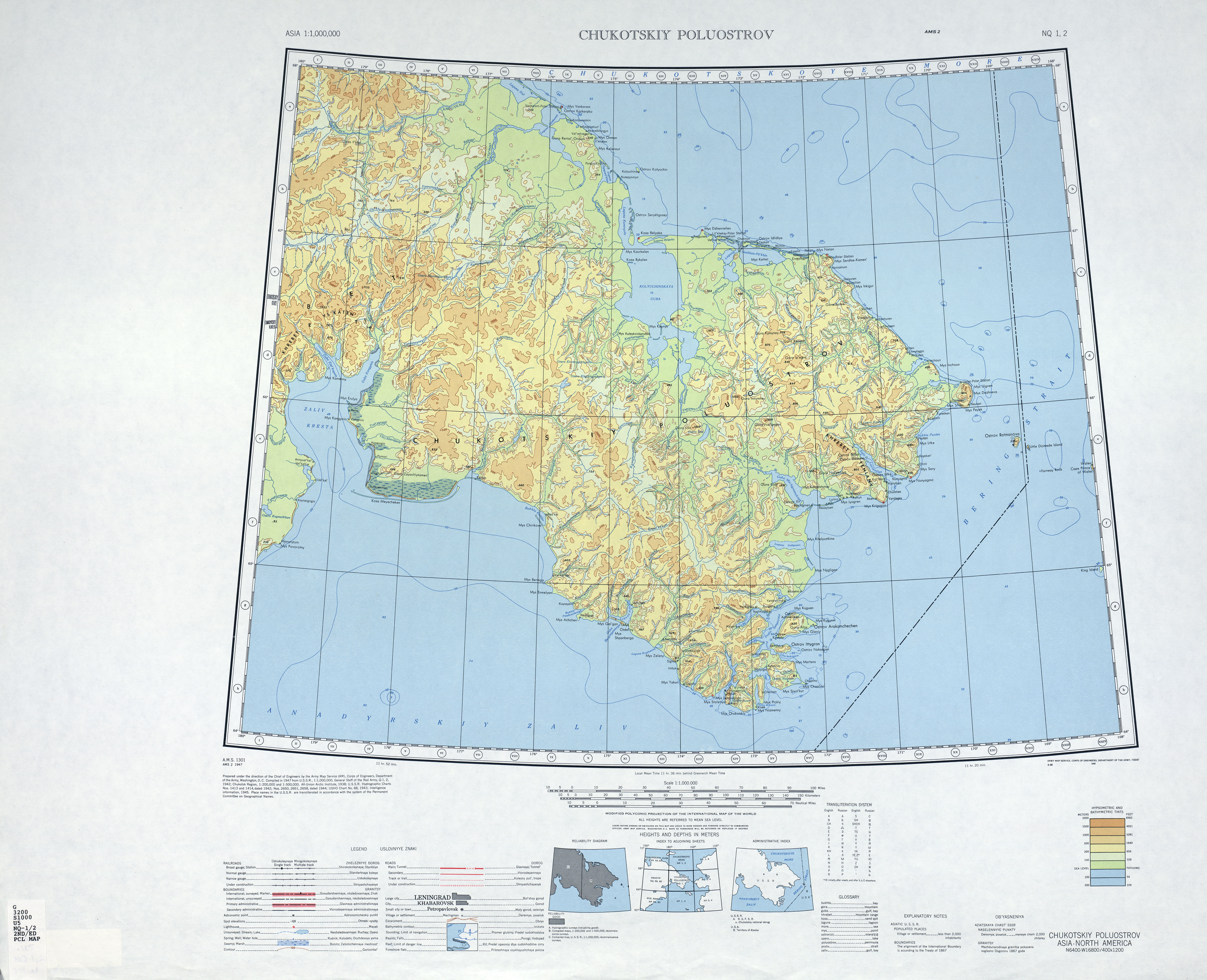
1947 map of the Chukchi Peninsula.

== See also ==
- List of fjords of Russia
