= Sireniki =

Sireniki Сиреники Сиӷинык (Yupik)
- Selo
- Interactive map of Sireniki
- Location of Sireniki Sireniki (Chukotka Autonomous Okrug)
- Coordinates: 64°25′00″N 173°57′00″W
- Country: Russia
- Federal subject: Chukotka Autonomous Okrug
- Administrative district: Providensky District

Population (2010 Census)
  - Total: 469
  - Estimate (January 2016): 376 (−19.8%)

Municipal status
  - Municipal district: Providensky Municipal District
  - Urban settlement: Provideniya Urban Settlement
- Time zone: UTC+12 (MSK+9)
- Postal code: 689273
- Dialing code: +7 42735
- OKTMO ID: 77710000116

Sireniki (Russian: Сиреники; Yupik: Сиӷинык, lit. 'Horn Mountain'; Chukchi: Вутээн, romanized: Wutēn; Sirenik: Sigheneg) is a village (selo) in Providensky District of Chukotka Autonomous Okrug, in the Far Eastern Federal District of Russia. Population: 469 (2010 census); Municipally, Sireniki is subordinated to Providensky/Providenia Municipal District. In 2010, a law was passed abolishing the municipal rural settlement of Sireniki. The village continues to exist, but is now municipally part of Providenia Urban Settlement.

== Geography ==
The placement of the settlement owes much to a sizeable polynya at the shore of the village, allowing the inhabitants to hunt all year round. The village is situated north of Cape Stoletiya and Southeast of Cape Zelyony on the coast where the Maingyvykvyn, Sirenik-Keivuk and Sineveyem empty into the sea. There are numerous high cliffs surrounding the village, some of which have been named by the local people with poetic names such as "Sokol" (falcon) and "Yablochko" (little apple). Nearby is a marine grotto called "Sochi" after the Black Sea resort, which the villagers use for swimming in the summer.

=== Wildlife ===
The existence of the polynya attracts a wide variety of sea life, numerous species of whales and seals inhabit the area, and the village is situated along the main spring migration route of the Bowhead whale, the target of the majority of the Yupik inhabitants hunting. To the east of the village, the Imtuk Lagoon is rich in fish and the inhabitants catch cod during the winter and salmon in the summer. there are also a wide range of different bird species that nest in the high cliffs surrounding the village, including puffins and gulls.

== History ==
=== Early history ===
Sireniki is the only historically Yupik settlement in Chukotka, and the village has been established on the same site for 2-2,500 years, and originated because it was situated on the migration route of whales. It is also the only pre-historic village in Chukotka to have been continuously occupied to the present day. There are numerous traces of ancient Yupik settlement in and around the village, however the majority of this is now buried under the village fox farm. There are three separately identified areas of ancient settlement. The oldest of these is called Valvurak, which was inhabited from the 1st century AD until its abandonment in the 19th century. The other two are called Sliygu, a set of three dugout dwellings dating from the Punuk Period and Tykylia, another set of dugout dwellings cut into the side of a volcano and used as habitation from the start of the 19th century to the mid twentieth century. The dwellings in these old part of the village were supported by the bones of the whales that the inhabitants harvested.

The origin of the name of the village is a matter of debate. Some sources state that it means "Mountain of Horns", though others suggest it comes from the words for "Valley of the Sun" or "Wheatgrass".

=== Recent history ===
Historically the village has been populated by Yupik, however in the 1960s, following a drive to force the nomadic reindeer-herding Chukchi to live a more settled life, a number who lived in the Kurupkan River valley were moved to the village, though the Yupik of the village still practice traditional marine hunting.

The Sirenik Eskimo language, which some consider as separate from Yupik and Inuit language groups, was spoken by the Sirenik people in the village until 1997, when the last native speaker died.

== Municipal reorganisation ==
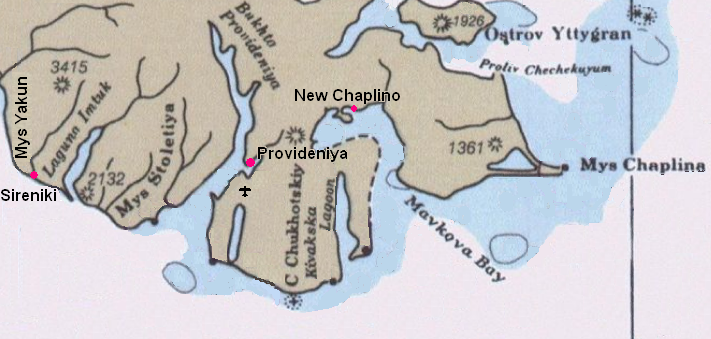
Sireniki, Provideniya Bay, and surrounding area

On September 10, 2010, a law was passed abolishing Novoye Chaplino and Sireniki at municipal level. Novoye Chaplino as an entity continues to exist, but it is no longer a rural settlement on its own, but simply an inhabited locality within Provideniya urban settlement. The right of the village to local administration was removed and such responsibilities were taken over by Provideniya municipal administration on January 1, 2011. Provideniya municipal administration also took control of all municipal property, all municipal property rights and all local budgets on this date.

== Demographics ==
The population according to the most recent census data is 469, of whom 239 were male and 230 female, a reduction on a 2006 estimate of 533 (although other sources merely state a population over 500). In 2014, the head of the rural settlement was Natalia Protopopova.

== Economics ==
The Yupik population in the village continues traditional sea hunting practices, and preserve traditional methods of construction for boats. In addition there is also a fox farm which, along with sea hunting is the main source of employment in the village. There is also a general store, a school and a library in the village, though following the collapse of the Soviet Union, the school shrank from a ten-grade school to a six-grade school due to the difficulty in finding suitably qualified teachers.

== Transport ==
The village is a 15-minute flight from Provideniya, although according to a 2006 source, there are no scheduled flights available. Other than approaching the village by sea, the only other route is a 70 km unpaved road across a number of mountain passes.

== Climate ==
Sireniki has a Tundra climate (ET) because the warmest month has an average temperature between 0 °C (32 °F) and 10 °C (50 °F). The coldest month of the year is January, whilst the warmest is July. On average, the temperature does not rise above freezing between November and April and it snows at least once in every month except July and August.

Climate data for Sireniki
Month	Jan	Feb	Mar	Apr	May	Jun	Jul	Aug	Sep	Oct	Nov	Dec	Year
Record high °C (°F)	3 (37)	7 (45)	3 (37)	6 (43)	14 (57)	22 (72)	23.9 (75.0)	22.2 (72.0)	19.1 (66.4)	8 (46)	6.1 (43.0)	4.4 (39.9)	23.9 (75.0)
Mean daily maximum °C (°F)	−11.1 (12.0)	−12.1 (10.2)	−9.1 (15.6)	−5.1 (22.8)	2.4 (36.3)	8.1 (46.6)	11.9 (53.4)	11.2 (52.2)	6.9 (44.4)	0.4 (32.7)	−5.6 (21.9)	−9.6 (14.7)	1.0 (33.8)
Mean daily minimum °C (°F)	−15.5 (4.1)	−17.5 (0.5)	−15.6 (3.9)	−11.6 (11.1)	−2.2 (28.0)	2.5 (36.5)	6.2 (43.2)	6.1 (43.0)	2.4 (36.3)	−2.9 (26.8)	−9.2 (15.4)	−13.7 (7.3)	−5.9 (21.4)
Record low °C (°F)	−39.1 (−38.4)	−33.7 (−28.7)	−32.2 (−26.0)	−27.3 (−17.1)	−17 (1)	−4.1 (24.6)	1.7 (35.1)	−1 (30)	−5.6 (21.9)	−16.8 (1.8)	−25.7 (−14.3)	−30.4 (−22.7)	−39.1 (−38.4)
Average rainfall mm (inches)	48 (1.9)	36 (1.4)	30 (1.2)	33 (1.3)	30 (1.2)	36 (1.4)	54 (2.1)	81 (3.2)	81 (3.2)	60 (2.4)	75 (3.0)	60 (2.4)	624 (24.6)
Average snowy days	18	14	14	19	13	2	0	0	3	16	19	19	137

== See also ==
- List of inhabited localities in Providensky District
