= Provideniya =

Provideniya Провидения Гуврэл (Chukchi)
- Urban-type settlement
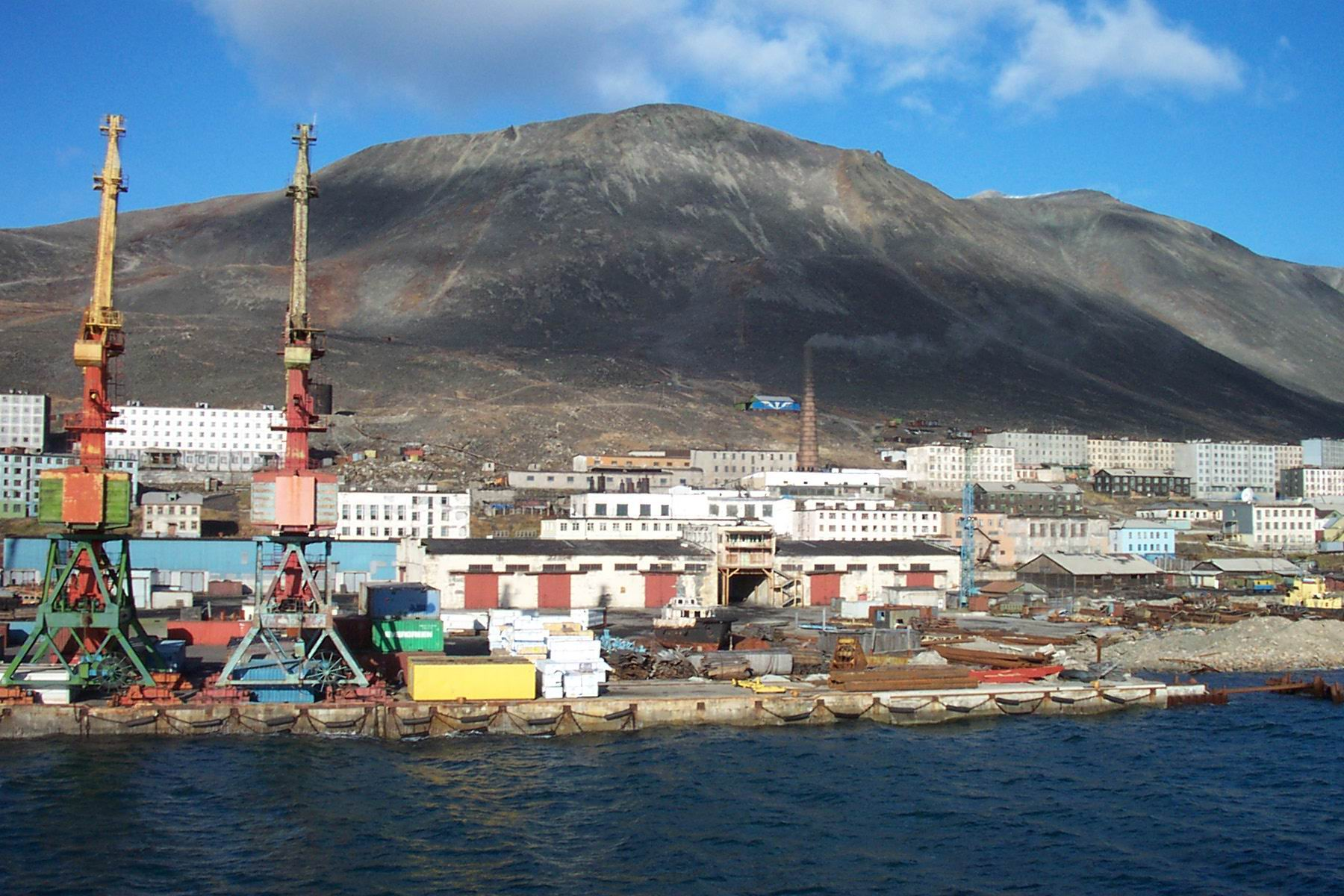
- View of Provideniya from Komsomolskaya Bay
- Interactive map of Provideniya
- Location of Provideniya Provideniya (Chukotka Autonomous Okrug)
- Coordinates: 64°25′N 173°15′W
- Country: Russia
- Federal subject: Chukotka Autonomous Okrug
- Administrative district: Providensky District
- Founded: May 10, 1946
- Urban-type settlement status since: April 25, 1957

Government
  - Head: Dmitry Olkhovik

Population (2010 Census)
  - Total: 1,970
  - Estimate (January 2016): 2,082 (+5.7%)

Administrative status
  - Capital of: Providensky District

Municipal status
  - Municipal district: Providensky Municipal District
  - Urban settlement: Provideniya Urban Settlement
  - Capital of: Providensky Municipal District, Provideniya Urban Settlement
- Time zone: UTC+12 (MSK+9)
- Postal code: 689251
- OKTMO ID: 77710000051

Provideniya (Russian: Провиде́ния, IPA: [prəvʲɪˈdʲenʲɪjə]; Chukchi: Гуврэл Guvrel) is an urban locality (an urban-type settlement) and the administrative center of Providensky District of Chukotka Autonomous Okrug, Russia, located on Komsomolskaya Bay (a part of Providence Bay) in the northeastern part of the autonomous okrug, across the Bering Strait from Alaska, and very close to the International Date Line. The population has declined in recent decades: 1,970 (2010 census); 2,723 (2002 census); 5,432 (1989 Soviet census).

== Geography ==
Provideniya is a former Soviet military port, sited on a fjord sheltered from the Bering Sea. The largest inhabited locality east of Anadyr, it was established as a port to serve the eastern end of the Northern Sea Route. The port is found in Komsomolskaya Bay (named after the Soviet Komsomol youth organization), a part of the much larger Provideniya Bay, providing a suitable deep water harbor for Russian ships, close to the southern limits of the winter ice fields. Lake Istikhed is located south of Provideniya airfield, on the eastern side of the bay.

== History ==
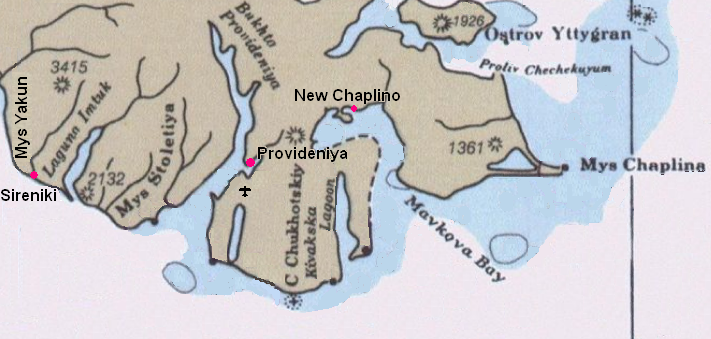
Provideniya, Provideniya Bay, and surrounding area

After discovery in 1660 of Providence Bay by the Russian expedition led by Kurbata Ivanov, the surrounding waters became a regular site for wintering fishing, whaling, and merchant ships. In the early 20th century, with the beginning of the development of the Northern Sea Route along the coast of the bay, a coal depot was constructed for refueling ships heading west back across the Arctic and in 1933 the first buildings of the future seaport were constructed in what would later become the settlement of Provideniya (lit. "of Providence"). In 1937, with the arrival of a convoy with building materials for the construction company Providenstroy, active construction of the port and the settlement began. On May 10, 1946, the settlement of Provideniya was officially established by the Decree of the Presidium of the Supreme Soviet of the Russian SFSR. The settlement continued to grow quickly and military units began to be deployed here. On April 25, 1957, it was granted work settlement status. In 1975, it was planned to grow the settlement into a town with a population of twelve thousand and to rename it "Dezhnyov". However, social and economic upheavals in the post-Soviet period left these plans unfulfilled and in the period from 1994 to 2002 no construction was undertaken at all.

== Administrative and municipal status ==
Within the framework of administrative divisions, Provideniya serves as the administrative center of Providensky District, to which it is directly subordinated. As a municipal division, the urban-type settlement of Provideniya is incorporated within Providensky Municipal District as Provideniya Urban Settlement.

== Economy and infrastructure ==
There is a technical school, one functioning movie theater, a post office, a museum of Chukotka history and culture, one of the only two ski slopes in Chukotka, a bakery complex, and port facilities.

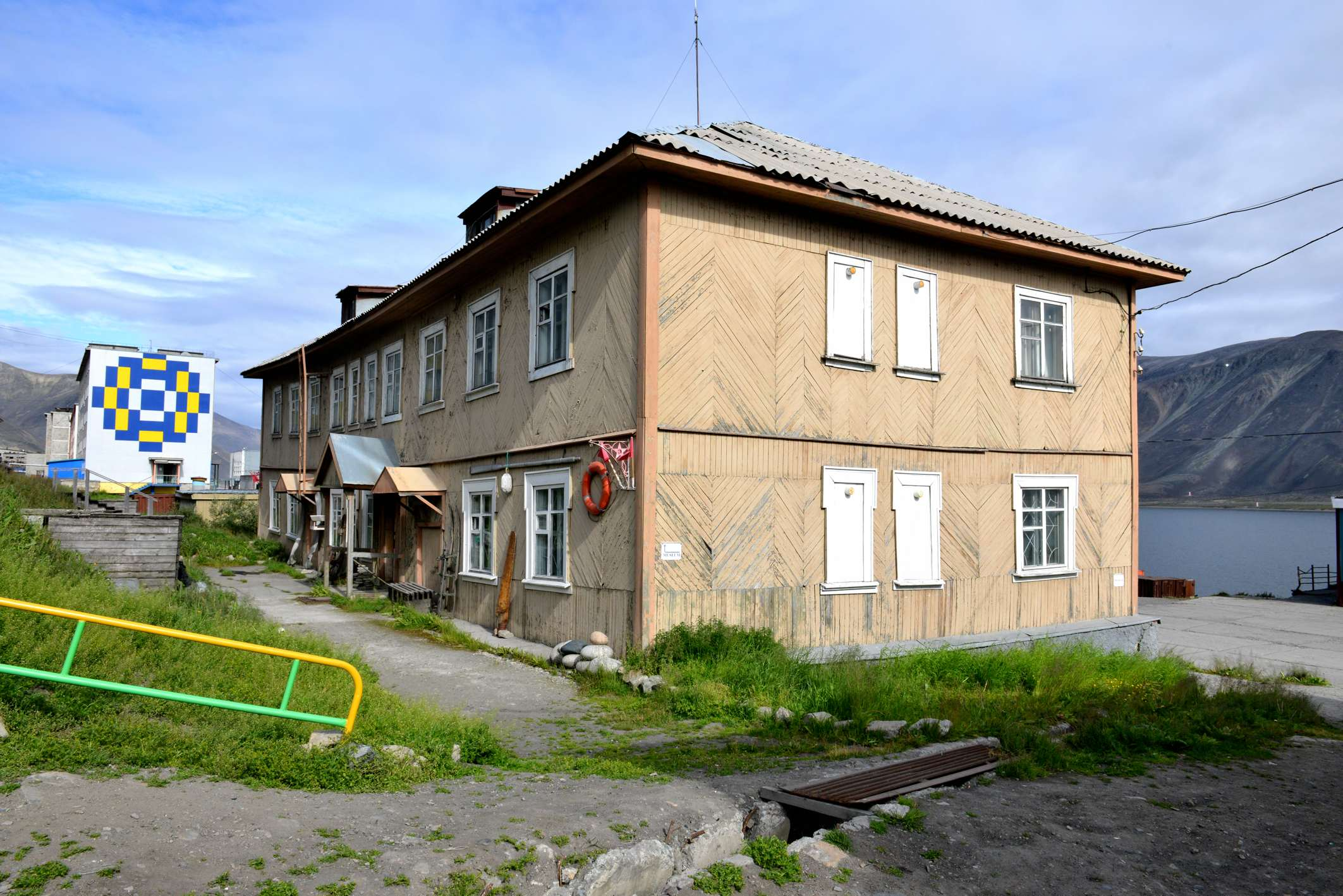
Local museum

== Transport ==
The settlement is served by the Provideniya Bay Airport, the closest Russian airport to the United States.

Provideniya is sometimes referred to as the Doorway to the Arctic, and since the dissolution of the Soviet Union, tourism from nearby Alaska has given the local economy a significant boost. Bering Air, an Alaskan airline, offers charter services to the Provideniya Bay Airport from both Nome and Anchorage. Alaska Airlines made a Friendship Flight to Provideniya in July 1988. Chukotavia provides flights to Anadyr.

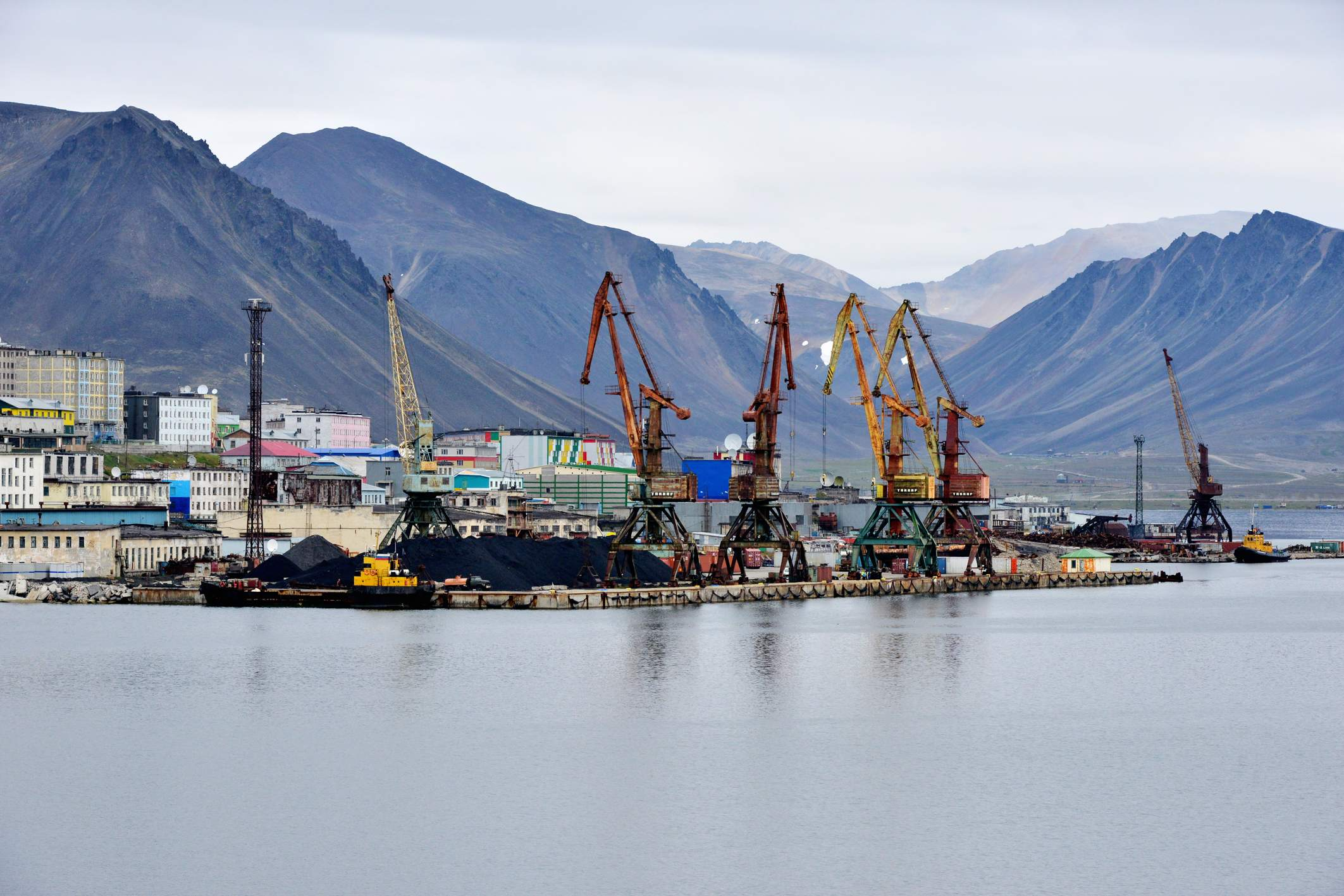
Seaport facilities in Provideniya

High-sprung transports connect the settlement's concrete slabbed main street with outlying destinations along the fjord and coast.

== Demographics ==
A significant proportion of the settlement's current residents are Yupik, reflecting the high percentage of indigenous peoples in both Providensky and Chukotsky Districts. The settlement and the surrounding area struggle from alcoholism (which is especially high in indigenous areas), causing a high death rate, a low birth rate, and the population decline since 1990.

== Climate ==
Provideniya has a dry-summer polar climate (Köppen ETs), although winters are not as severe due to the coastal location and colorful flowers help bring the tundra to life during the summer. Winter temperatures are significantly higher than at other places within Chukotka such as Uelen and Ushakovskoye, because it is a more southerly settlement with greater maritime influence from the Bering Sea, as is the case with nearby Nome in the US, which has similar winter conditions. Summers are generally cool and the settlement receives heavy rainfall, especially when low pressure systems move northwards from the Pacific Ocean.

Climate data for Provideniya
Month	Jan	Feb	Mar	Apr	May	Jun	Jul	Aug	Sep	Oct	Nov	Dec	Year
Record high °C (°F)	7.1 (44.8)	5.1 (41.2)	3.7 (38.7)	6.6 (43.9)	15.2 (59.4)	26.2 (79.2)	25.3 (77.5)	22.8 (73.0)	19.1 (66.4)	12.0 (53.6)	7.5 (45.5)	6.1 (43.0)	26.2 (79.2)
Mean maximum °C (°F)	−0.5 (31.1)	−1.3 (29.7)	−0.2 (31.6)	2.5 (36.5)	9.1 (48.4)	16.7 (62.1)	19.6 (67.3)	17.4 (63.3)	12.5 (54.5)	6.2 (43.2)	3.1 (37.6)	0.8 (33.4)	20.2 (68.4)
Mean daily maximum °C (°F)	−12 (10)	−11.5 (11.3)	−9.3 (15.3)	−4.5 (23.9)	2.6 (36.7)	9.0 (48.2)	12.4 (54.3)	11.6 (52.9)	7.5 (45.5)	1.1 (34.0)	−4.3 (24.3)	−9.5 (14.9)	−0.6 (30.9)
Daily mean °C (°F)	−15.1 (4.8)	−14.7 (5.5)	−13 (9)	−8 (18)	0.0 (32.0)	5.8 (42.4)	9.3 (48.7)	8.9 (48.0)	5.1 (41.2)	−1.0 (30.2)	−6.8 (19.8)	−12.3 (9.9)	−3.8 (25.2)
Mean daily minimum °C (°F)	−18.2 (−0.8)	−17.9 (−0.2)	−16.6 (2.1)	−11.4 (11.5)	−2.6 (27.3)	2.5 (36.5)	6.2 (43.2)	6.3 (43.3)	2.4 (36.3)	−3.2 (26.2)	−9.3 (15.3)	−15.1 (4.8)	−6.4 (20.5)
Mean minimum °C (°F)	−29.1 (−20.4)	−29.7 (−21.5)	−27 (−17)	−22.2 (−8.0)	−11.1 (12.0)	−1.7 (28.9)	2.6 (36.7)	2.2 (36.0)	−3.2 (26.2)	−10.6 (12.9)	−19.9 (−3.8)	−25.8 (−14.4)	−31.8 (−25.2)
Record low °C (°F)	−39.7 (−39.5)	−43.2 (−45.8)	−38.7 (−37.7)	−36.5 (−33.7)	−22 (−8)	−7 (19)	−0.4 (31.3)	−3.6 (25.5)	−9.4 (15.1)	−18.6 (−1.5)	−28.7 (−19.7)	−35.4 (−31.7)	−43.2 (−45.8)
Average precipitation mm (inches)	57.7 (2.27)	48.4 (1.91)	38.5 (1.52)	37.2 (1.46)	33.6 (1.32)	28.1 (1.11)	49.5 (1.95)	75.6 (2.98)	64.4 (2.54)	77.2 (3.04)	89.0 (3.50)	52.5 (2.07)	651.7 (25.66)
Average precipitation days (≥ 1.0 mm)	7.3	8.5	6.7	7.2	6.3	4.9	6.5	10.9	8.3	8.8	9.5	8.7	93.6
Mean monthly sunshine hours	12.4	84.7	173.6	204.0	189.1	216.0	182.9	130.2	114.0	71.3	27.0	3.1	1,408.3
Source 1: Météo climat stats
Source 2: Météo Climat

== Religion ==
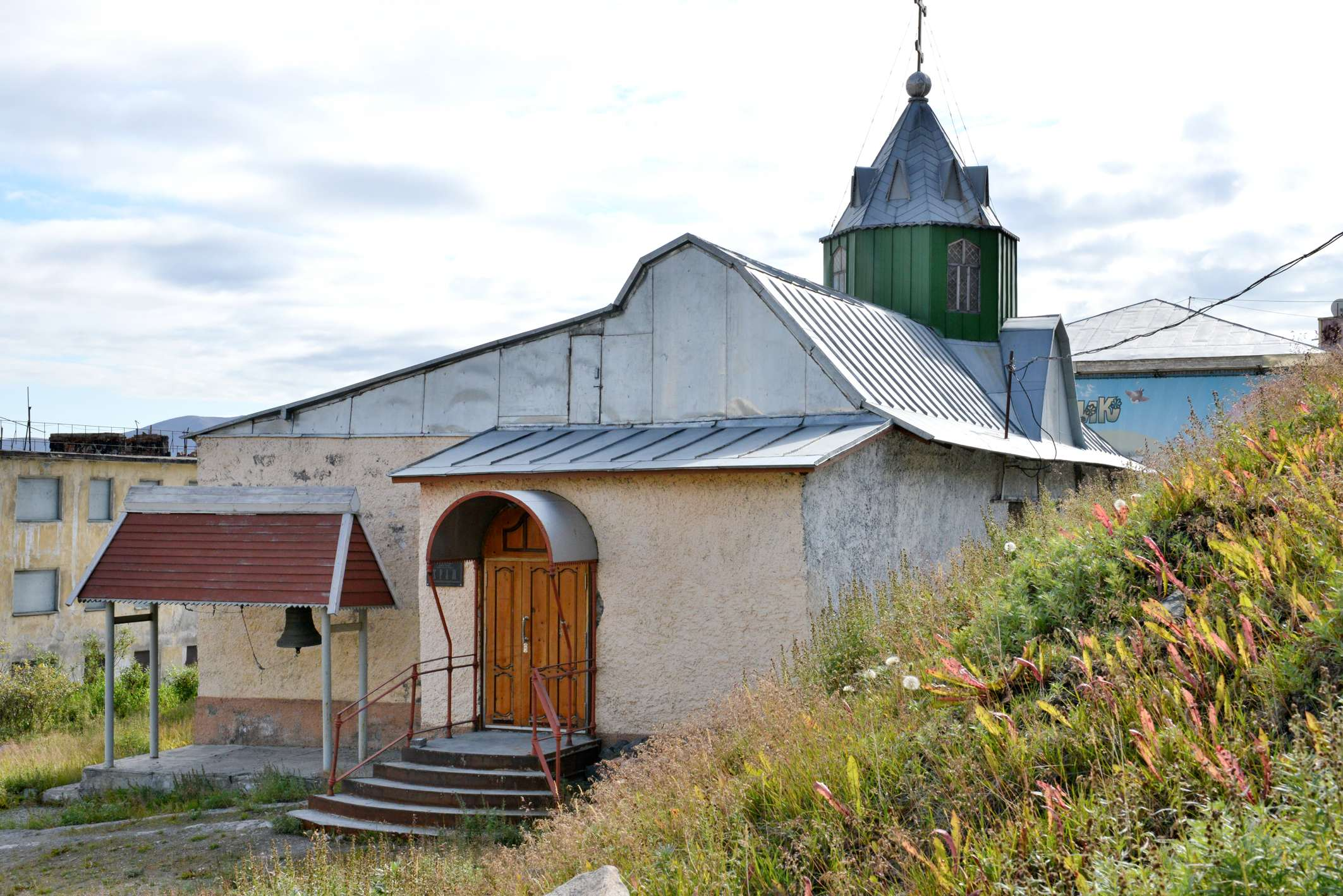
Russian Orthodox church building in Provideniya

An evangelical church run by the local Moldovan community and missionaries is located in Provideniya. A Russian Orthodox church also operates.

== See also ==
- List of inhabited localities in Providensky District
