= List of rural localities in Chukotka Autonomous Okrug =

Map of Russia with Chukotka Autonomous Okrug highlighted

This is a list of rural localities in Chukotka Autonomous Okrug. Chukotka Autonomous Okrug (Russian: Чуко́тский автоно́мный о́круг, romanized: Chukotsky avtonomny okrug, IPA: [tɕʊˈkotskʲɪj ɐftɐˈnomnɨj ˈokrʊk]; Chukot: Чукоткакэн автономныкэн округ, Chukotkaken avtonomnyken okrug, [tɕukotˈkaken aβtonomˈnəken ˈokɹuɣ]) or Chukotka (Чуко́тка) is a federal subject (an autonomous okrug) of Russia. It is geographically located in the Far East region of the country, and is administratively part of the Far Eastern Federal District. Chukotka is the 2nd-least-populated federal subject at 50,526 (2010) and the least densely populated.

== Anadyrsky District ==
Rural localities in Anadyrsky District:

- Alkatvaam
- Beryozovo
- Chuvanskoye
- Kanchalan
- Khatyrka
- Krasneno
- Lamutskoye
- Markovo
- Meynypilgyno
- Snezhnoye
- Ust-Belaya
- Vayegi

== Anadyr Urban Okrug ==
Rural localities in Anadyr:

- Tavayvaam

== Bilibinsky District ==
Rural localities in Bilibinsky District:

- Anyuysk
- Ilirney
- Keperveyem
- Omolon
- Ostrovnoye

== Chaunsky District ==
Rural localities in Chaunsky District:

- Apapelgino
- Ayon
- Rytkuchi
- Yanranay

== Chukotsky District ==
Rural localities in Chukotsky District:

- Enurmino
- Inchoun
- Lavrentiya
- Lorino
- Neshkan
- Uelen

== Iultinsky District ==
Rural localities in Iultinsky District:

- Amguema
- Billings
- Konergino
- Nutepelmen
- Ryrkaypiy
- Uelkal
- Vankarem

== Providensky District ==
Rural localities in Providensky District:

- Enmelen
- Novoye Chaplino
- Nunligran
- Sireniki
- Yanrakynnot

== Shmidtovsky District ==
Rural localities in Shmidtovsky District:

- Ushakovskoye

== See also ==
- Lists of rural localities in Russia
