= Shmidtovsky District =

Administrative division of Chukotka Autonomous Okrug, Russia

Coordinates: 68°40′N 177°00′E

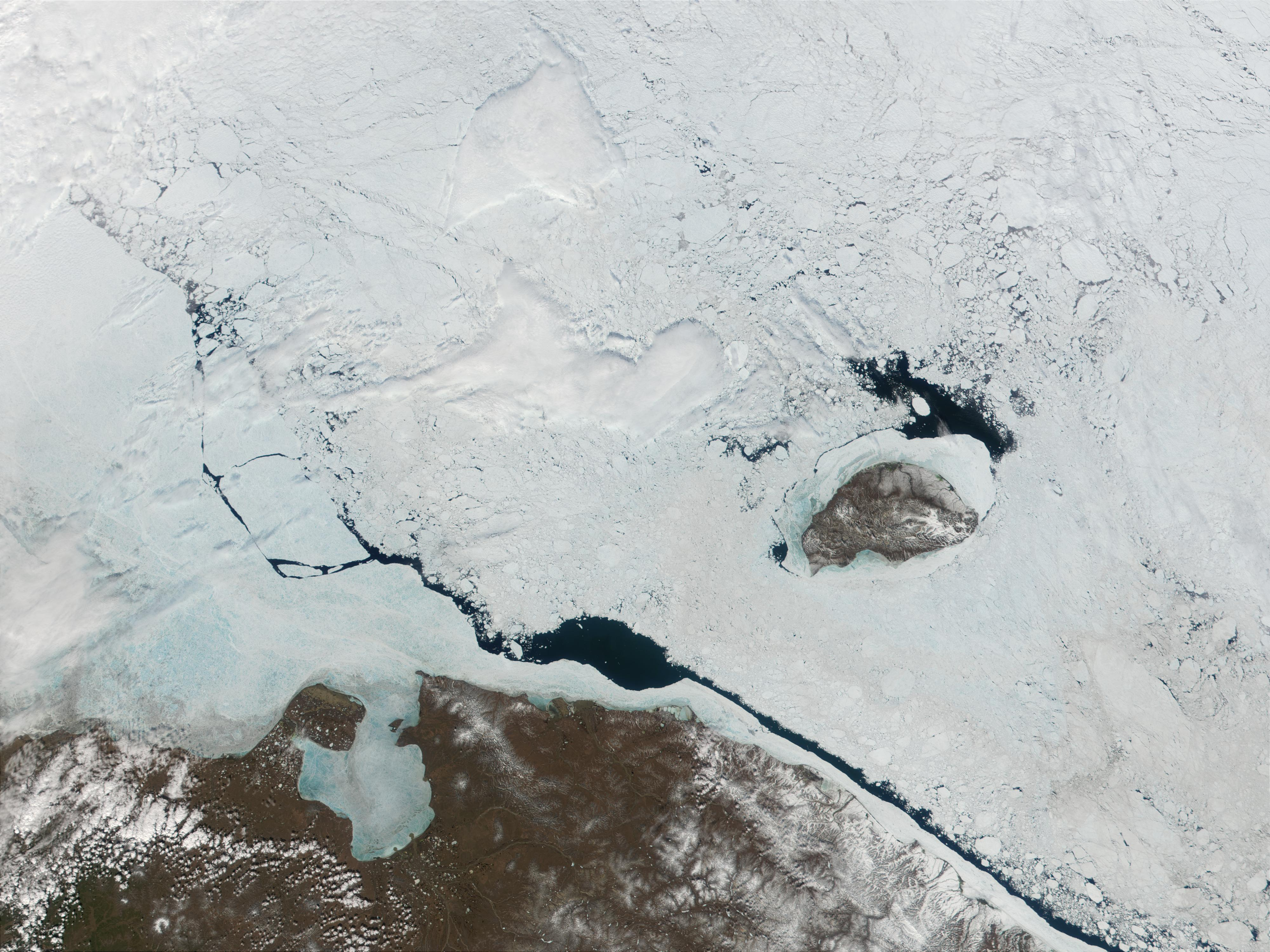
True color MODIS photograph of Wrangel Island and northern Shmidtovsky District coastline, taken in 2001. Chaunskaya Bay, Chaunsky District, can be seen to the southwest.

Shmidtovsky District (Russian: Шми́дтовский райо́н) was an administrative district (raion) of Chukotka Autonomous Okrug, Russia, which existed in 1973–2011. As a municipal division, it was, together with Iultinsky Administrative District, incorporated as Iultinsky Municipal District. It was located in the far north of the autonomous okrug and bordered with Iultinsky District in the east, Anadyrsky District in the south, and with Chaunsky District in the west. The area of the district was 70,900 square kilometers (27,400 sq mi). Its administrative center was the urban locality (an urban-type settlement) of Mys Shmidta. Population: 1,469 (2010 Census); 2,660 (2002 Census); 15,726 (1989 Soviet census). The population of Mys Shmidta accounted for 33.5% of the district's total population.

== History ==
Shmidtovsky District was founded in 1973. It was named after Otto Schmidt, a Soviet scientist. Beyond the mainland, the district also incorporated the UNESCO World Heritage Site, Wrangel Island, which straddles the 180° meridian, and its neighboring island Herald, which in 2004 was added to the UNESCO World Heritage Site list at the same time as Wrangel Island.

The indigenous population made up around 28% of the total population of the district, which, although lower than in Chukotsky and Providensky Districts, was at the time around average in the autonomous okrug.

Signs of earlier habitation by indigenous peoples can be seen at several sites throughout the former district's territory. In the central parts of the region one can still see the Pegtymel rock drawings, where images were carved into the rock by the local inhabitants using quartz. Over a hundred more examples of ancient artwork can be seen on eleven of the Kaikuul cliffs, describing hunting and farming scenes as well as what is thought to be early references to Shamanism.

== Economy ==
The main economic drivers were gold mining, traditional reindeer herding, and marine hunting. However, there was little mining done in the vicinity of Mys Shmidta, with the three main prospecting teams in the region (Polyarnaya, Arktikaand, and Shakhtar) being based in Leningradsky.

=== Transportation ===
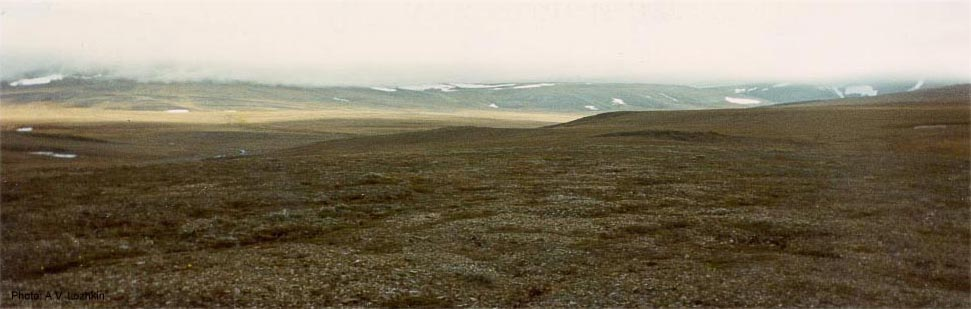
Wrangel Island Tundra

Although much of the internal region of the district was given over to reindeer pasture, thus creating a significant area of wilderness, connections between the populated places along the coast were present. As with all areas of Siberia and the Russian Far East, there was very limited road transport. There is a road, however, linking Mys Shmidta with Egvekinot. There is also a 435-kilometer (270 mi) unpaved road between Mys Shmidta and Komsomolsky, of which 235 kilometers (146 mi) is unpaved road and the remaining 199 kilometers (124 mi) is snow road.

In addition to local road transport, the district was also served by Mys Shmidta Airport, located immediately to the southwest of the settlement. The airport is now employed solely for civilian usage, providing flights to Anadyr. Flights are provided by Chukotavia. The runway is 2,450-meter (8,040 ft) long and 60-meter (200 ft) wide. The distance to Anadyr by air is 478 kilometers (297 mi).

Unlike airports such as the Provideniya Bay Airport, which has always been a civilian airport, or the Iultin Airport, which was constructed specifically to serve the needs of the remote mine nearby, the Mys Shmidta airport was initially part of the ring of forward staging bases used by the Arctic Control Group (OGA) prior to intercontinental ballistic missiles gaining favor as the primary means of long-range defense.

== Status changes ==
Before May 2008, Shmidtovsky Administrative District was municipally incorporated as Shmidtovsky Municipal District. In May 2008, Iultinsky and Shmidtovsky Municipal Districts were merged, forming an enlarged Vostochny Municipal District. This change, however, did not affect the administrative aspect of these districts. Both Iultinsky and Shmidtovsky Administrative Districts continued to exist separately. In October 2008, the law mandating the change was amended and the name Vostochny was discarded with the combined municipal district being renamed Iultinsky Municipal District.

Shmidtovsky Administrative District was itself merged into Iultinsky Administrative District effective June 13, 2011.

== Climate ==
The climate of the former Shmidtovsky District is more severe than in neighboring Alaska or even as in the neighboring districts and varies significantly throughout the year. Average July temperatures could range from +4 °C (39 °F) to +14 °C (57 °F), and January temperatures from −18 to −42 °C (0 to −44 °F). The lowest temperatures were characteristic for the western part of the region while storms and winds were frequent on the eastern coast. The summer was short but comparatively warm.

== Divisions ==
=== Administrative divisions ===
Shmidtovsky Administrative District had administrative jurisdiction over two urban-type settlements (Mys Shmidta and Leningradsky) and two rural localities (Billings and Ryrkaypiy).

=== Municipal ===
Shmidtovsky Municipal District was abolished in 2008, and all of the municipal formations previously within the district became a part of Iultinsky Municipal District.
