= Iultin =

Ghost town in Chukotka Autonomous Okrug, Russia

Iultin Иультин Ивылтин (Chukchi)
- Urban-type settlement (abolished)
- Interactive map of Iultin
- Location of Iultin Iultin (Chukotka Autonomous Okrug)
- Coordinates: 67°52′34″N 178°44′20″W
- Country: Russia
- Federal subject: Chukotka Autonomous Okrug
- Administrative district: Iultinsky District
- Founded: 1937
- Abolished: 1995

Population
  - Estimate (April 2010): 0 )

Municipal status
  - Municipal district: Iultinsky District
- Postal code: 689227
- Dialing code: +7 42734
- Website: www.iultin.ru

Iultin (Russian: Иультин; Chukchi: Ивылтин) was an urban-type settlement in Chukotka Autonomous Okrug, part of the Far Eastern Federal District of Russia. As of 2010 the area is uninhabited. At its peak in 1989 it had a population of 5,301 (1989 Soviet census). The settlement was established to house the workers and administrative staff of the tin and tungsten mines, with transport connections with the port, Egvekinot being constructed by Gulag prisoners. The settlement was abolished in 1995, when mining activities became no longer profitable.

== History ==
=== Origin of name ===
The settlement was named for the nearby Mount Iultin. According to one source, the name translated from the Chukchi means "long icicle", though another source translates the name as "long feathers." It is thought that either of these translations are due to the variety of quartz veins on the mountains slopes.

=== Soviet period ===
The settlement was created following the discovery in 1936 of tin and tungsten deposits in the area. The settlement is extremely isolated and was initially not connected by any form of road to any other settlement, with supplies initially needing to be delivered by tractor convoy, a journey of some 400 km, often undertaken in bitter arctic conditions, which severely limited the distance the convoy could travel each day. Life was equally hard for the initial 73 settlers, who had to endure the harsh winter either in tents or plywood houses.

This means of supplying the settlement was ultimately impractical and in 1946, a large group of prisoners disembarked from the MV Sovetskaya Latviya in Kresta Bay and began construction of the port town of Egvekinot and the 200 km road from Egvekinot through the indigenous settlement of Amguema to Iul'tin. A diesel power plant was constructed in 1952 in Iultin to provide power to the settlement, and in 1959, a steam-driven plant in Ozyorny was completed to augment the power supply both to Iul'tin and Egvekinot.

=== Post-Soviet period ===
Iultin was a key element of the Chukotkan economy during Soviet times. The port of Egvekinot provided the means to transport the tin and tungsten mined in Iultin to the wider world, and the village of Amguema was the base of the reindeer herding sovkhoz, which provided meat for the inhabitants of all the settlements along the Iultin-Egvekinot road. Iultin was a highly valued resource during Soviet times, with the mines on a list of the top one hundred most strategically valuable resources in the whole country.

However, following the collapse of the Soviet Union, the eradication of a centrally planned economy and the advent of private markets, the true cost of the Iultin mines was revealed, and it was not economically viable to extract and transport the metals there. A government decree was issued in December 1995 by Prime Minister Victor Chernomyrdin, to formalize the liquidation of the settlement. The settlement was officially abolished in 1995, with the industrial plants closed in May of that year, all utilities (water, gas and heating) cut off in June, and all but a handful of people removed before the first winter snowfalls in September. Although other sources suggest that the settlement was only fully shut down by the Chukotkan regional administration in 1996, and that the shutdown was completed with all services cut off before a number of residents had been able to move away.

The population table below shows the impact on the settlement as a result of the closure of the mines.

Demographic Evolution
1959	1970	1979	1989	2002
2513	4033	4115	5301	0

A number of these individuals refused to leave the settlement for a number of years and survived in a subsistence manner, living off foraged berries and on fish caught in local rivers. One remaining inhabitant is reported as having earned money by distilling spirits for sale to the few passing geologists in the area, but essentially there was no economic structure left in the settlement. Despite Iultin being liquidated in 1995, there are reports that some of those who refused to leave were still living in the abandoned settlement in 2002.

Individuals employed in the mines and other plants in Iultin were particularly hard hit by the liquidation of the settlement. The decree issued by Chernomyrdin guaranteed that residents would be moved from Iultin to other settlements, that they would be given housing worth 250,000 rubles, and have transportation costs paid for no more than one ton of possessions, that the Ministry for Railways was to provide assistance in transporting inhabitants to their new homes and that the Ministry for Nationalities provide assistance for the inhabitants to find new housing and employment in their new homes. However, in reality, the inhabitants of Iultin were effectively abandoned with little in the way of assistance and compensation. As well as the plant and mine workers, those employed in ancillary services such as the bakery, other shops and farms supplying goods to the plant and mine workers were also equally hard hit by the liquidation.

Not all industries were so hard hit. The education department, based in Egvekinot, evacuated its staff and assets from Iultin and distributed them around the remaining schools in Iultinsky District. Likewise, the Department for Public Works removed assets such as trucks and buses from Iultin and used them to bolster their resources around Egvekinot. Employees of the district administration in Iultin fared significantly better than those employed in the mines or power plants. These employees were absorbed into the local administration in Egvekinot. This absorption was so successful that in 2002, seven years after the liquidation of Iultin, the deputy district chief was the former Mayor of Iultin and the heads of the departments for education, agriculture and social welfare were also former inhabitants of Iultin. In this way, the primary employer in the district shifted from the mines and plants of Iultin and their auxiliary services to the state.

Little effort has been made to clean up the local environment following the abolition of the settlement.

== See also ==
- List of inhabited localities in Iultinsky District
- Ushakovskoye – another ghost town in Iultinsky District, on Wrangel Island
- Polyarny – another ghost town in Iultinsky District
