= Ozyorny Microdistrict =

Coordinates: 66°49′06″N 179°07′24″W

Ozyorny Microdistrict (Russian: микрорайон Озёрный) is a microdistrict (a residential area) of the urban-type settlement of Egvekinot in Iultinsky District of Chukotka Autonomous Okrug. It was formerly a separate rural locality (a selo). Its population in 2006 was estimated at 650.

Geographically, it is located about 13 kilometers (8.1 mi) north of Egvekinot on the road that links it with the indigenous locality of Amguema and the former mining town of Iultin.

== History ==
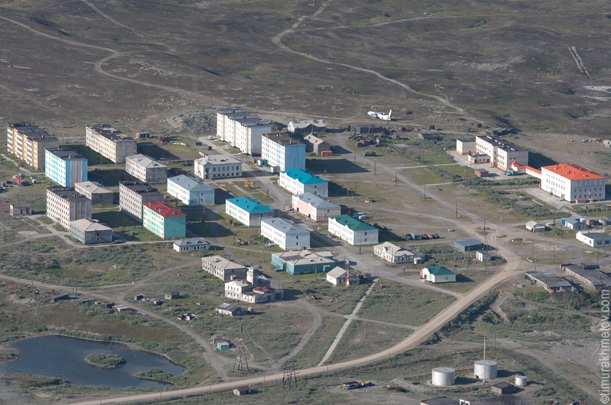
Aerial view of Ozyorny Microdistrict

Ozyorny was established in 1952 to house the workers and administrators of the nearby diesel power station. In the 1960s, it expanded to accommodate surveyors plotting the course of the road to Iultin as well as those involved in the Mainypyntyvaam geological survey expedition. The microdistrict remained home to a large group of geologists up until the 1990s. The majority of these people are now gone because the Iultin Mining and Processing Enterprise and the Eastern Chukotka Geological Survey Expedition were liquidated. Today, Ozyorny has a high school, a post office, and a food store.

== Transportation ==
Ozyorny is situated on the Iultin-Egvekinot road. About 10 kilometers (6.2 mi) further north, spanning the road to Iultin, is a metal arch signifying the point where the Arctic Circle bisects the road. Nearby are the ruins of one of the camps used to house the prisoners who built the road. The road is the longest in Chukotka. There is also a small network of roads within the microdistrict.

== Climate ==
Ozyorny Microdistrict has a Continental Subarctic or Boreal (taiga) climate (Dfc).

Climate data for Ozyorny Microdistrict
Month	Jan	Feb	Mar	Apr	May	Jun	Jul	Aug	Sep	Oct	Nov	Dec	Year
Record high °C (°F)	1.2 (34.2)	2.2 (36.0)	5.1 (41.2)	5 (41)	14 (57)	26 (79)	28 (82)	25.6 (78.1)	23.4 (74.1)	10.8 (51.4)	5 (41)	3.6 (38.5)	28 (82)
Mean daily maximum °C (°F)	−19.7 (−3.5)	−17.4 (0.7)	−14.5 (5.9)	−8.2 (17.2)	2 (36)	11.2 (52.2)	15.8 (60.4)	13.7 (56.7)	7.9 (46.2)	−1.8 (28.8)	−8.9 (16.0)	−16.6 (2.1)	−3.2 (26.2)
Mean daily minimum °C (°F)	−26.6 (−15.9)	−24.6 (−12.3)	−21.8 (−7.2)	−15.7 (3.7)	−3.8 (25.2)	3.8 (38.8)	8.8 (47.8)	7.5 (45.5)	2.1 (35.8)	−7.1 (19.2)	−15.7 (3.7)	−23.4 (−10.1)	−9.7 (14.5)
Record low °C (°F)	−44 (−47)	−41.1 (−42.0)	−39 (−38)	−32.5 (−26.5)	−22.5 (−8.5)	−5.7 (21.7)	−12.1 (10.2)	−5 (23)	−10.4 (13.3)	−25.3 (−13.5)	−35.8 (−32.4)	−40 (−40)	−44 (−47)
Average rainfall mm (inches)	41.7 (1.64)	44.8 (1.76)	32.7 (1.29)	24.5 (0.96)	16.1 (0.63)	24.9 (0.98)	42.2 (1.66)	44.9 (1.77)	37.1 (1.46)	28.5 (1.12)	38.7 (1.52)	32.3 (1.27)	408.4 (16.08)
Average snowy days	15	14	13	15	14	1	0	0	3	16	18	15	124

== See also ==
- List of inhabited localities in Iultinsky District
