= Konergino =

Konergino Конергино Кэӈиергын (Chukchi)
- Selo
- Interactive map of Konergino
- Location of Konergino Konergino (Chukotka Autonomous Okrug)
- Coordinates: 65°54′N 178°50′W
- Country: Russia
- Federal subject: Chukotka Autonomous Okrug
- Administrative district: Iultinsky District

Population (2010 Census)
  - Total: 424
  - Estimate (January 2016): 335 (−21%)

Municipal status
  - Municipal district: Iultinsky Municipal District
  - Rural settlement: Konergino Rural Settlement
  - Capital of: Konergino Rural Settlement
- Time zone: UTC+12 (MSK+9)
- Postal code: 689215
- Dialing code: +7 42734
- OKTMO ID: 77715000116

Konergino (Russian: Конергино; Chukchi: Кэӈиергын, Kèňiergyn) is a village (selo) in Iultinsky District of Chukotka Autonomous Okrug, in the Far Eastern Federal District of Russia. Population 424 (2010 census); Municipally, Konergino is subordinated to Iultinsky Municipal District and incorporated as Konergino Rural Settlement.

== Geography ==
Like other villages in the district such as Amguema, Konergino is a reindeer-herding settlement. The settlement is located on the eastern shore of Kresta Bay, south of Egvekinot. The village's name is derived from the Chukchi Kei'i'yergyn, meaning "curved valley". The village has a high school, and a cultural center, a daycare center, a food store.

== History ==
Founded in 1927, Konergino was originally part of the Nutepelmen Agricultural Soviet and belonged to Anadyrsky District At that time the housing in the village consisted of little more than a few huts and Yarangas. However, in 1939, Konergino was split off from the Nutepelmen Soviet and established as its own kholkoz. Following this establishment, a new warehouse was built along with wooden frame and stone houses. In 1953, a hospital was constructed in the village along with a boarding school, with a kindergarten being added two years later. In 1984 a two-storey secondary school was completed.

The main occupation of the inhabitants are reindeer herding and agriculture farmers. The village is the central base for the municipal agricultural enterprise "Revival" (Russian: Возрождение). The village has a boarding school, outpatient clinic, a post office, communications center, clubhouse and two shops. The surrounding villages are an old airfield and Olovyannaya Bay the site of the landing of the founders of the settlement. To date, all the houses in the village are in a state of disrepair. In the future, the construction of new housing.

== Demographics ==
The population according to the most recent census results is 424, of which 279 are men and 252 women, a significant reduction on a 2006 estimate of 560; which itself is flat against a 2003 estimate of 559, of whom the vast majority were Chukchi.

== Transport ==
Konergino is not connected to any other part of the world by road however, there exists a small road network within the village including: (in Russian)

- улица Комсомольская (Ulitsa Komsomolskaya, lit. Komsomol Street)
- улица Ленина (Ulitsa Lenina, lit. Lenin Street)
- улица Октябрьская (Ulitsa Oktyabrskaya, lit. October Street)
- улица Ровтытагина (Ulitsa Rovtytagina)
- улица Чукотская (Ulitsa Chukotskaya, lit. Chukotka Street)
- улица Школьная (Ulitsa Shkolnaya, lit. School Street)

== Climate ==
Konergino has an arctic tundra climate (Köppen climate classification ET) with bitterly cold, very long winters and short, cool summers.

Climate data for Konergino
Month	Jan	Feb	Mar	Apr	May	Jun	Jul	Aug	Sep	Oct	Nov	Dec	Year
Mean daily maximum °C (°F)	−15.1 (4.8)	−18.4 (−1.1)	−16.2 (2.8)	−9.8 (14.4)	−0.2 (31.6)	7.1 (44.8)	11.2 (52.2)	9.8 (49.6)	5.1 (41.2)	−2.7 (27.1)	−9.9 (14.2)	−15.5 (4.1)	−4.6 (23.8)
Daily mean °C (°F)	−19.1 (−2.4)	−22 (−8)	−20 (−4)	−13.9 (7.0)	−3.4 (25.9)	3.9 (39.0)	7.9 (46.2)	6.9 (44.4)	2.8 (37.0)	−5.4 (22.3)	−12.9 (8.8)	−19 (−2)	−7.8 (17.9)
Mean daily minimum °C (°F)	−23.0 (−9.4)	−25.6 (−14.1)	−23.7 (−10.7)	−18.0 (−0.4)	−6.6 (20.1)	0.7 (33.3)	4.6 (40.3)	4.1 (39.4)	0.5 (32.9)	−8.1 (17.4)	−15.8 (3.6)	−22.5 (−8.5)	−11.1 (12.0)
Average precipitation mm (inches)	30 (1.2)	23 (0.9)	11 (0.4)	15 (0.6)	16 (0.6)	33 (1.3)	63 (2.5)	62 (2.4)	46 (1.8)	30 (1.2)	31 (1.2)	19 (0.7)	379 (14.8)

== See also ==
- List of inhabited localities in Iultinsky District

== Sources ==
- Дума Чукотского автономного округа. Закон №33-ОЗ от 30 июня 1998 г. «Об административно-территориальном устройстве Чукотского автономного округа», в ред. Закона №55-ОЗ от 9 июня 2012 г. «О внесении изменений в Закон Чукотского автономного округа "Об административно-территориальном устройстве Чукотского автономного округа"». Вступил в силу по истечении десяти дней со дня его официального опубликования. Опубликован: "Ведомости", №7 (28), 14 мая 1999 г. (Duma of Chukotka Autonomous Okrug. Law #33-OZ of June 30, 1998 On the Administrative-Territorial Structure of Chukotka Autonomous Okrug, as amended by the Law #55-OZ of June 9, 2012 On Amending the Law of Chukotka Autonomous Okrug "On the Administrative-Territorial Structure of Chukotka Autonomous Okrug". Effective as of after ten days from the day of the official publication.). (in Russian)
- Дума Чукотского автономного округа. Закон №149-ОЗ от 24 ноября 2008 г. «О статусе, границах и административных центрах муниципальных образований на территории Иультинского муниципального района Чукотского автономного округа», в ред. Закона №85-ОЗ от 20 октября 2010 г «Об упразднении сельского поселения Нутэпэльмен Иультинского муниципального района Чукотского автономного округа и о внесении изменений в отдельные законодательные акты Чукотского автономного округа». Вступил в силу через десять дней со дня официального опубликования. Опубликован: "Ведомости", №46/1 (373/1), 28 ноября 2008 г. (Duma of Chukotka Autonomous Okrug. Law #149-OZ of November 24, 2008 On the Status, Borders, and Administrative Centers of the Municipal Formations on the Territory of Iultinsky Municipal District of Chukotka Autonomous Okrug, as amended by the Law #85-OZ of October 20, 2010 On the Abolition of Nutepelmen Rural Settlement of Iultinsky Municipal District of Chukotka Autonomous Okrug and on Amending Several Legislative Acts of Chukotka Autonomous Okrug. Effective as of the day ten days after the official publication date.). (in Russian)
- McKnight, Tom L; Hess, Darrel (2000). "Climate Zones and Types". Physical Geography: A Landscape Appreciation. Upper Saddle River, NJ: Prentice Hall. ISBN 0-13-020263-0.
- M Strogoff, P-C Brochet, and D. Auzias Petit Futé: Chukotka (2006). "Avant-Garde" Publishing House.
