= Billings, Russia =

Billings Биллингс Валӄаран (Chukchi)
- Selo
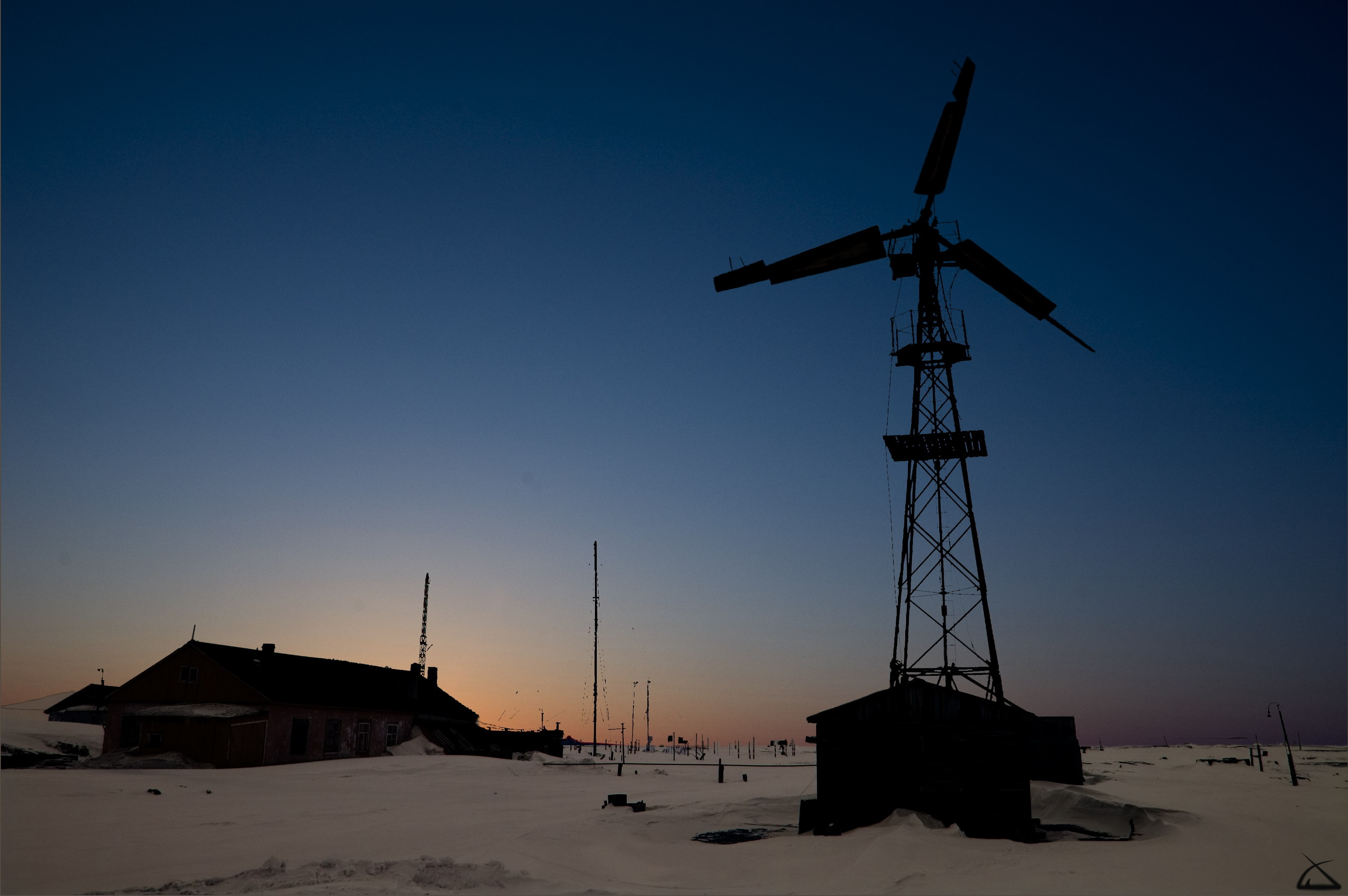
- Nighttime view of Billings
- Interactive map of Billings
- Location of Billings Billings (Chukotka Autonomous Okrug)
- Coordinates: 69°52′N 175°45′E
- Country: Russia
- Federal subject: Chukotka Autonomous Okrug
- Administrative district: Iultinsky District
- Founded: 19th century

Population (2010 Census)
  - Total: 211
  - Estimate (January 2016): 193 (−8.5%)

Municipal status
  - Municipal district: Chaunsky Municipal District
  - Rural settlement: Billings Rural Settlement
  - Capital of: Billings Rural Settlement
- Time zone: UTC+12 (MSK+9)
- Postal code: 689380
- Dialing code: +7 42737
- OKTMO ID: 77705000116

Billings (Russian: Би́ллингс; Chukot: Валӄаран, Valḳaran) is a rural locality (a selo) in Iultinsky District of Chukotka Autonomous Okrug, Russia. The population is 211 (2010 census); municipally, it is incorporated as Billings Rural Settlement in Chaunsky Municipal District.

== Etymology ==
Like the neighbouring village of Mys Shmidta, Billings is named after a nearby cape, which in turn was named after British Captain Joseph Billings (1758—1806) who was at the service of the Russian Imperial Navy during Catherine the Great's reign. The cape itself marks the point of separation between the Chukchi Sea and the East Siberian Sea. Joseph Billings was an English-born member of the Russian navy who in 1785, together with C. G. Sarychevym, was part of the expedition that mapped and researched the coast of North-Eastern Siberia. Using reindeer, he crossed Chukotka as far as Kolyuchinskaya Guba and mapped the area.

The local Chukchi people originally called the place "Valkyran", meaning a dugout of whale jaws. This is in reference to the remains of an ancient Inuit camp consisting of a number of homes dug into the soil and constructed of wood and the bones of the Greenland whale.

== History ==
In 1935, a polar station was established on the site of the village for the first time, and two years later the first national council was established in the area named Valkyran after their traditional name for the area. In 1948, the local Chukchi herders were collectivised and named their new Sovkhoz after Lenin.

== Geography ==
Billings is located on the coast of the East Siberian Sea, part of the Arctic Ocean, just east of Cape Billings. Other than the mining settlements of Leningradsky and Mys Shmidta, Billings is one of the few populated areas in this part of Russia between Cape Shelag and Cape Dezhnyov. Billings is situated near the former Chukchi settlement of Gytkhelen.

== Demographics ==
The population of the village according to the most recent census data is 211, of whom 109 are male and 102 female, a significant decrease on a 2006 estimate of 324.

=== Administrative and municipal jurisdiction ===
Billings was part of Shmidtovsky Municipal District of Chukotka until that district was merged into Iultinsky Municipal District in 2008. On December 15, 2009, Billings was transferred to Chaunsky Municipal District. Administratively, however, Billings remained under the jurisdiction of Shmidtovsky Administrative District until the latter was merged into Iultinsky Administrative District in 2011 and ceased to exist.

== Climate ==
Billings has an arctic tundra climate (Köppen climate classification ET) with extremely long, bitterly cold winters and very short, cold summers. Precipitation is low throughout the year, with summers being somewhat wetter than winters.

Climate data for Cape Billings (Climate ID:25062)
Month	Jan	Feb	Mar	Apr	May	Jun	Jul	Aug	Sep	Oct	Nov	Dec	Year
Record high °C (°F)	7.8 (46.0)	5.5 (41.9)	6.2 (43.2)	9.1 (48.4)	12.8 (55.0)	24.6 (76.3)	29.0 (84.2)	25.5 (77.9)	18.1 (64.6)	10.9 (51.6)	5.2 (41.4)	6.0 (42.8)	29.0 (84.2)
Mean daily maximum °C (°F)	−23.5 (−10.3)	−23.4 (−10.1)	−20.7 (−5.3)	−13.6 (7.5)	−2.2 (28.0)	4.8 (40.6)	7.4 (45.3)	6.7 (44.1)	2.7 (36.9)	−5.3 (22.5)	−13.5 (7.7)	−20.3 (−4.5)	−8.4 (16.9)
Daily mean °C (°F)	−26.9 (−16.4)	−26.8 (−16.2)	−24.7 (−12.5)	−17.8 (0.0)	−5.3 (22.5)	1.7 (35.1)	3.9 (39.0)	3.5 (38.3)	0.3 (32.5)	−8.1 (17.4)	−16.9 (1.6)	−23.7 (−10.7)	−11.7 (10.9)
Mean daily minimum °C (°F)	−30.4 (−22.7)	−30.2 (−22.4)	−28.2 (−18.8)	−21.9 (−7.4)	−8.5 (16.7)	−0.6 (30.9)	1.4 (34.5)	1.2 (34.2)	−1.5 (29.3)	−10.8 (12.6)	−20.4 (−4.7)	−27.3 (−17.1)	−14.8 (5.4)
Record low °C (°F)	−49.3 (−56.7)	−50.7 (−59.3)	−45.3 (−49.5)	−40.6 (−41.1)	−33.8 (−28.8)	−13 (9)	−3.9 (25.0)	−6.1 (21.0)	−16.3 (2.7)	−33.9 (−29.0)	−40.4 (−40.7)	−45.4 (−49.7)	−50.7 (−59.3)
Average precipitation mm (inches)	11 (0.4)	9 (0.4)	7 (0.3)	10 (0.4)	11 (0.4)	16 (0.6)	27 (1.1)	27 (1.1)	22 (0.9)	21 (0.8)	18 (0.7)	11 (0.4)	190 (7.5)
Source: Roshydromet

Historical population
Year	Pop.	±%
2002	274	—
2010	211	−23.0%
2021	154	−27.0%
Source: Census data

== See also ==
- List of inhabited localities in Chaunsky District

== Sources ==
- Дума Чукотского автономного округа. Закон №33-ОЗ от 30 июня 1998 г. «Об административно-территориальном устройстве Чукотского автономного округа», в ред. Закона №55-ОЗ от 9 июня 2012 г. «О внесении изменений в Закон Чукотского автономного округа "Об административно-территориальном устройстве Чукотского автономного округа"». Вступил в силу по истечении десяти дней со дня его официального опубликования. Опубликован: "Ведомости", №7 (28), 14 мая 1999 г. (Duma of Chukotka Autonomous Okrug. Law #33-OZ of June 30, 1998 On the Administrative-Territorial Structure of Chukotka Autonomous Okrug, as amended by the Law #55-OZ of June 9, 2012 On Amending the Law of Chukotka Autonomous Okrug "On the Administrative-Territorial Structure of Chukotka Autonomous Okrug". Effective as of after ten days from the day of the official publication.). (in Russian)
- Дума Чукотского автономного округа. Закон №46-ОЗ от 29 ноября 2004 г. «О статусе, границах и административных центрах муниципальных образований на территории Чаунского района Чукотского автономного округа», в ред. Закона №125-ОЗ от 2 декабря 2011 г. «О внесении изменений в Приложение 2 к Закону Чукотского автономного округа "О статусе, границах и административных центрах муниципальных образований на территории Чаунского района Чукотского автономного округа"». Вступил в силу через десять дней со дня официального опубликования. Опубликован: "Ведомости", №31/1 (178/1), 10 декабря 2004 г. (Duma of Chukotka Autonomous Okrug. Law #46-OZ of November 29, 2004 On the Status, Borders, and Administrative Centers of the Municipal Formations on the Territory of Chaunsky District of Chukotka Autonomous Okrug, as amended by the Law #125-OZ of December 2, 2011 On Amending Appendix 2 of the Law of Chukotka Autonomous Okrug "On the Status, Borders, and Administrative Centers of the Municipal Formations on the Territory of Chaunsky District of Chukotka Autonomous Okrug". Effective as of the day which is ten days after the official publication date.). (in Russian)
- McKnight, Tom L; Hess, Darrel (2000). "Climate Zones and Types". Physical Geography: A Landscape Appreciation. Upper Saddle River, NJ: Prentice Hall. ISBN 0-13-020263-0.
- M Strogoff, P-C Brochet, and D. Auzias Petit Futé: Chukotka (2006). "Avant-Garde" Publishing House
