= Uelkal =

Uelkal Уэлькаль Валъӄалыӄ (Yupik)
- Selo
- Interactive map of Uelkal
- Location of Uelkal Uelkal (Chukotka Autonomous Okrug)
- Coordinates: 65°32′N 179°17′W
- Country: Russia
- Federal subject: Chukotka Autonomous Okrug
- Administrative district: Iultinsky District

Population (2010 Census)
  - Total: 243
  - Estimate (January 2016): 191 (−21.4%)

Municipal status
  - Municipal district: Iultinsky Municipal District
  - Rural settlement: Uelkal Rural Settlement
  - Capital of: Uelkal Rural Settlement
- Time zone: UTC+12 (MSK+9)
- Postal code: 689215
- Dialing code: +7 42734
- OKTMO ID: 77715000136

Uelkal (Russian: Уэлькаль; Yupik languages: Валъӄалыӄ, lit. 'Whale Jaw'; Chukot: Валӄалԓьан, romanized: Valḳalḷʼan) is a village (selo) in Iultinsky District of Chukotka Autonomous Okrug, Russia. Population: 243 (2010 census); a slight reduction on a 2003 estimate of 258, of whom 208 were indigenous people, which itself showed a slight increase, up from 202 the previous year. The village is located approximately 100 kilometers (60 mi) away from the administrative centre of Egvekinot, at the western side of the mouth of Kresta Bay. Municipally, Uelkal is subordinated to Iultinsky Administrative District and incorporated as Uelkal Rural Settlement.

== Geography ==
Uelkal is situated on the south side of Cape Annyualkal spit at the entrance to Kresta Bay, by the Bering Sea, 174 km from the District centre Egvekinot. The village is the most western settlement in Russia in the western hemisphere and the most western Eskimo settlements in the world.

== History ==
The village was founded in 1920 by settlers from Cape Chaplino. During World War II, this was the eastern stage on the ALSIB Uelkal-Krasnoyarsk route for US-made lend-lease warplanes to Russia. During the mid-1950s, the Central Intelligence Agency suspected that a major bomber staging base was being built at Uelkal capable of reaching United States, however the Soviets instead built the facility at Anadyr Ugolny Airport 102 miles (164 km) to the south and the Uelkal airfield fell into decline. Until the early 2000s near the village acted as tropospheric intermediate relay station number 20/103, part of the "North" link (call sign – "Kazan"). As of 2002, it had 258 inhabitants, of whom 202 were indigenous people, though this has reduced significantly in the last decade, with 2014 estimates indicating a population of only 210.

== Economy ==
The village has a secondary school, a medical assistant-midwife centre, a pharmacy, a communications centre, and a store. The main sources of livelihood for the residents of this town are hunting seals, walrus, and whales, which is done as part of the municipal agricultural enterprise "Nanuk" (Russian: Нанук). In the village there is a high school, a kindergarten, a local hospital, pharmacy, home culture, communication center and shop as well as a rural folk club, the Chukchi-Eskimo group "Imlya", youth groups "Kiyagnyk" (lit. "Life") and "Avsinahak" (lit. "pups").

=== Transport ===
Uelkal is not connected to any other part of the world by road however, there is a small network of roads within the village including:

- улица Вальгиргина (Ulitsa Val′girgina)
- улица Набережная (Ulitsa Naberezhnaya, lit. Quay Street)
- улица Тундровая (Ulitsa Tundrovnaya, lit. Tundra Street)
- улица Центральная (Ulitsa Tsentralnaya, lit. Central Street)

== Climate ==
Uelkal has a Continental Subarctic or Boreal (taiga) climate (Dfc).

Climate data for Uelkal
Month	Jan	Feb	Mar	Apr	May	Jun	Jul	Aug	Sep	Oct	Nov	Dec	Year
Record high °C (°F)	2 (36)	7 (45)	5.9 (42.6)	10 (50)	17.5 (63.5)	26.2 (79.2)	25.7 (78.3)	25 (77)	20.6 (69.1)	8.9 (48.0)	7.2 (45.0)	6.3 (43.3)	26.2 (79.2)
Mean daily maximum °C (°F)	−16 (3)	−13.4 (7.9)	−12 (10)	−6.3 (20.7)	2.5 (36.5)	10.1 (50.2)	13.5 (56.3)	12.6 (54.7)	7.2 (45.0)	−1 (30)	−7.7 (18.1)	−13.4 (7.9)	−2 (28)
Mean daily minimum °C (°F)	−22.8 (−9.0)	−20.8 (−5.4)	−20 (−4)	−13.9 (7.0)	−3.3 (26.1)	2.7 (36.9)	7.3 (45.1)	6.9 (44.4)	1.7 (35.1)	−6 (21)	−13.6 (7.5)	−19.6 (−3.3)	−6.8 (19.8)
Record low °C (°F)	−46.1 (−51.0)	−46.7 (−52.1)	−40.6 (−41.1)	−32.4 (−26.3)	−23.5 (−10.3)	−5.3 (22.5)	−1 (30)	−3 (27)	−10 (14)	−20.1 (−4.2)	−30.7 (−23.3)	−36.6 (−33.9)	−46.1 (−51.0)
Average rainfall mm (inches)	32.7 (1.29)	29.6 (1.17)	34.5 (1.36)	23 (0.9)	32.9 (1.30)	44.8 (1.76)	71 (2.8)	83.7 (3.30)	52.7 (2.07)	52 (2.0)	48.5 (1.91)	23.3 (0.92)	528.7 (20.81)
Average snowy days	13	13	12	13	15	2	0	0	3	16	15	12	114

== Notable people ==
Ruslana Korshunova (1987-2008; aged 20) Russian-Kazakh supermodel.

== See also ==
- List of inhabited localities in Iultinsky District
