= Ruslana Korshunova =

Russian-Kazakh model (1987–2008)

- Korshunova backstage at a Yigal Azrouël fashion show in September 2007
- Born: Ruslana Sergeyevna Korshunova; 2 July 1987; Uelkal, Chukotka Autonomous Okrug, Russia, Soviet Union
- Died: 28 June 2008 (aged 20); New York City, U.S.
- Occupation: Model
- Modeling information
- Height: 174 cm (5 ft 9 in)
- Hair color: Dark Blonde
- Eye color: Green
- Agencies: Beatrice Models (Milan); Models 1 Marilyn Agency; IMG Models (Paris, London, & Milan)

Ruslana Sergeyevna Korshunova (Russian: Руслана Серге́евна Коршунова; 2 July 1987 – 28 June 2008) was a Russian model. Upon being discovered in 2003, Korshunova quickly gained international notoriety; receiving praise from The Sunday Times and British Vogue, who called her "a face to be excited about," in 2005.

In 2008, Korshunova, aged 20, committed suicide by jumping from her ninth-story apartment balcony in Manhattan's Financial District.

== Early life ==
Ruslana Korshunova was born in Uelkal, Chukotka, Russia and later moved with her family to Almaty, Kazakhstan. Her father Sergey Korshunov was a Red army officer who died in 1992 when she was five years old. According to her mother, Valentina Kutenkova, before Korshunova began modeling she was enrolled in a school for gifted children, and was fluent in Russian, English, Kazakh and German.

== Career ==
Korshunova was discovered in November 2003, by senior model booker of Models 1, Debbie Jones, who saw Korshunova in an All Asia magazine print story on Almaty's local German language club, which Korshunova was then attending. Her photograph, which was featured in the article, caught the attention of Debbie Jones of Models 1; Jones tracked down and signed the 15-year-old, whose knee-length hair led to her being nicknamed 'The Russian Rapunzel'.

Korshunova was represented by IMG, Beatrice Models, Traffic Models, Marilyn Model Agency and iCasting Moscow. British Vogue hailed her as "a face to be excited about" in 2005. She appeared on the covers of Elle France and Vogue Russia, in numerous runway shows, and in print ads for Nina Ricci, Blugirl by Blumarine, Clarins, Ghost, Girbaud, Kenzo, Marithé + François Girbaud, Max Studio, Moschino, Pantene, Paul Smith, Vera Wang, Marc Jacobs, Mario Sorrenti, Paolo Roversi, Donna Karan and Christian Dior. In 2006 Korshunova appeared in the Vogue Italia feature "Broken Dolls", photographed by Patrick Demarchelier. It was reported that, at this point, she was earning $7000 per shoot.

== Death ==
On 28 June 2008, at approximately 2:30 p.m., Korshunova fell 8.5 meters to her death, from the ninth-floor balcony of her apartment at 130 Water Street in New York's Financial District. Police stated that there were no signs of a struggle or violence and concluded that her death was a suicide. She left no note. A concierge working for her apartment block said that her hair "was much shorter than when I last saw her that night [...] It seemed like it was cut in a hurry since the ends were uneven".

Her former boyfriend stated that he dropped her off at her apartment several hours earlier, after they watched the film Ghost. She was not known to use drugs. A friend stated that she had just returned from a modeling job in Paris, noting that she seemed to be "on top of the world", and was making plans for her up-coming 21st birthday. However, Korshunova's blog posts countered that; her comments included "I'm so lost. Will I ever find myself?"; "I'm a bitch. I'm a witch. I don't care what you say."; and "It hurts, as if someone took a part of me, tore it out, mercilessly stomped all over and threw it out. My dream is to fly. Oh, my rainbow, it is too high."

Her body was returned to Russia and buried at Khovanskoye Cemetery in Moscow. Her mother does not believe that her daughter committed suicide, saying "She told me about her work problems about a year ago. She said that she wanted to quit the modeling career. Everything was fine with her recently though. If she had problems at work, she would have told me".

== Connection to Jeffrey Epstein ==
January 2024 documents revealed that in 2006, Korshunova had visited Little Saint James, the island belonging to sexual predator Jeffrey Epstein. Korshunova is mentioned posthumously in a July 2010 email, where Epstein mentioned the death of a Russian model two years earlier, blaming her boyfriend for refusing to get her the help she needed.

Additional records released in January 2026 include an August 2011 email from a third party to Epstein asking whether a modeling agency had failed to pay Korshunova. The same released materials include a saved image containing a quote attributed to Korshunova, though no context is provided. According to an email in the files, Korshunova was physically abused by her last boyfriend.
