= Polyarny, Chukotka Autonomous Okrug =

Former Russian urban-type settlement in Chukotka, Russia

Polyarny Полярный
- Urban-type settlement (abolished)
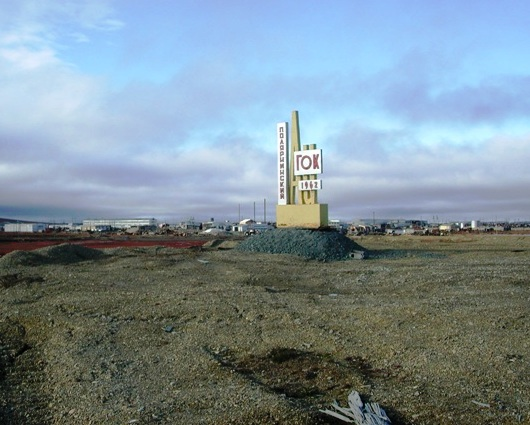
- Monument at the entrance to the abandoned settlement of Polyarny
- Interactive map of Polyarny
- Location of Polyarny Polyarny (Chukotka Autonomous Okrug)
- Coordinates: 69°09′50″N 178°43′04″E
- Country: Russia
- Federal subject: Chukotka Autonomous Okrug
- Administrative district: Iultinsky District
- Founded: 1963
- Abolished: 24 May 1995
- Elevation: 60 m (200 ft)

Municipal status
  - Municipal district: Iultinsky District
- Postal code: 686860
- Dialing code: +7 42722

Polyarny (Russian: Полярный) was an urban locality (an urban-type settlement) in Shmidtovsky District (now merged into Iultinsky District of Chukotka Autonomous Okrug), Russia, about 90 kilometers (56 mi) west of Mys Shmidta. Population: 0 (2002 census); 4,678 (1989 Soviet census).

== History ==
The settlement was specifically established to house miners working in the nearby goldmines.

In 1961, geologists working in the Pilkhinkuul river valley found a large gold deposit. On March 26, 1963, decree number 104 of the Northeastern Economic Council announced an official decision on the creation of a mine to be named "Polyarny" and a camp of the same name. The first convoy of 15 tractors brought equipment, building materials and everything needed to create the mine and the village. Despite the difficult conditions construction was rapid. The settlement was constructed in three locations: in the centre two-storeyed well-appointed homes and general social infrastructure were built. On the southern outskirts of the settlement, a more private sector was constructed, which became commonly known as "Shanghai" (Russian: Шанхай). This was also the site of a number of wooden houses with few amenities. Finally, in the northern part of the settlement production units were constructed along with a small residential area, which became known as "Bichgrad" (Russian: Бичгра́д), mostly consisting of single-story barracks. Because of its relative remoteness from the main part of the settlement a bus route was organised to the high school in 1975. In the north-eastern part of the village was a base of geologists with the residential area, which was known colloquially as "Exploration" (Russian: Разведка). At the end of the 1980s additional construction of residential buildings began, where people began to move from deplorable housing, where they had been living without repair since the foundation of the settlement. In accordance with the direction of the prevailing wind almost all the houses were oriented from east to west when they were constructed, and because of the permafrost layer, strong foundations were laid and no construction was undertaken higher than two storeys.

When mining became unprofitable, a law was passed in May 1995, abolishing the settlement; it was abolished in 1995. Polyarny had a population of around four thousand during the 1980s, but, as can be seen from the table below, once the mines were closed and the village liquidated, it became a ghost town.

Demographic Evolution
1979	1989	2002
4023	4678	0

In the early 1990s, the level of gold deposits in the Polyarny mines dwindled and more modern methods of extraction were required in order for the area to remain profitable.

== Transport ==
=== Air ===
From 1969 air transport was provided on a regular basis, using a dirt runway 450 m in length, located half a mile from the village. Passenger and mail transport was available to destinations across the district and to Pevek. Weather conditions often disrupted flights for several days or even weeks. In 1991, several years before the settlement was formally liquidated, air transport ceased.

=== Road ===
Polyarny was only ever connected by road to the neighbouring settlement of Leningradsky, also a settlement established specifically for mining. There was however, a small network of roads within the area, including:

- улица Заречная (ulitsa Zarechnaya)
- улица Набережная (ulitsa Naberezhnaya, lit. Quay Street)
- улица Октябрьская (ulitsa Oktyabrskaya, lit. October Street)
- улица Полевиков (ulitsa Polevikov)

== Gallery ==
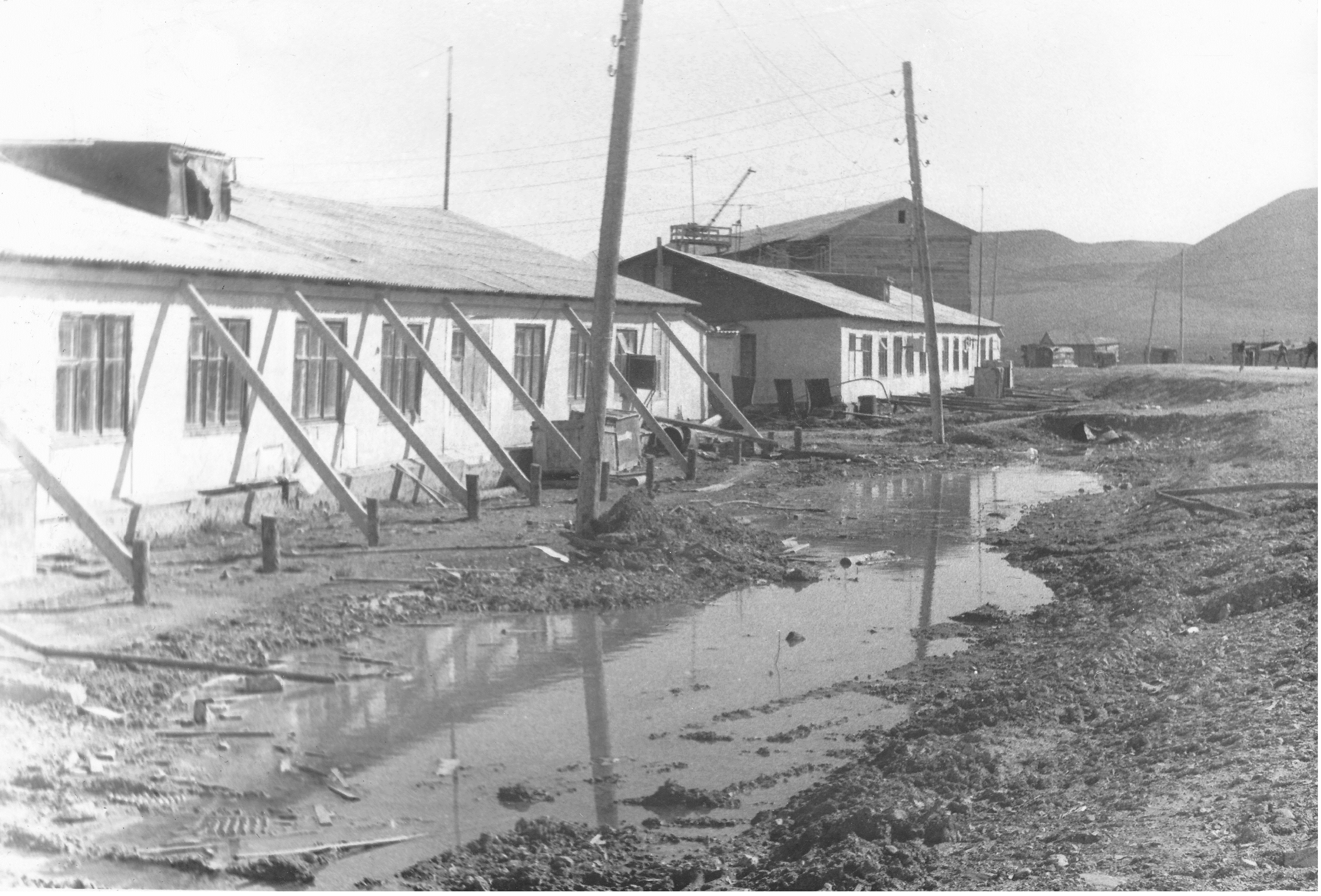
Accommodation Barracks

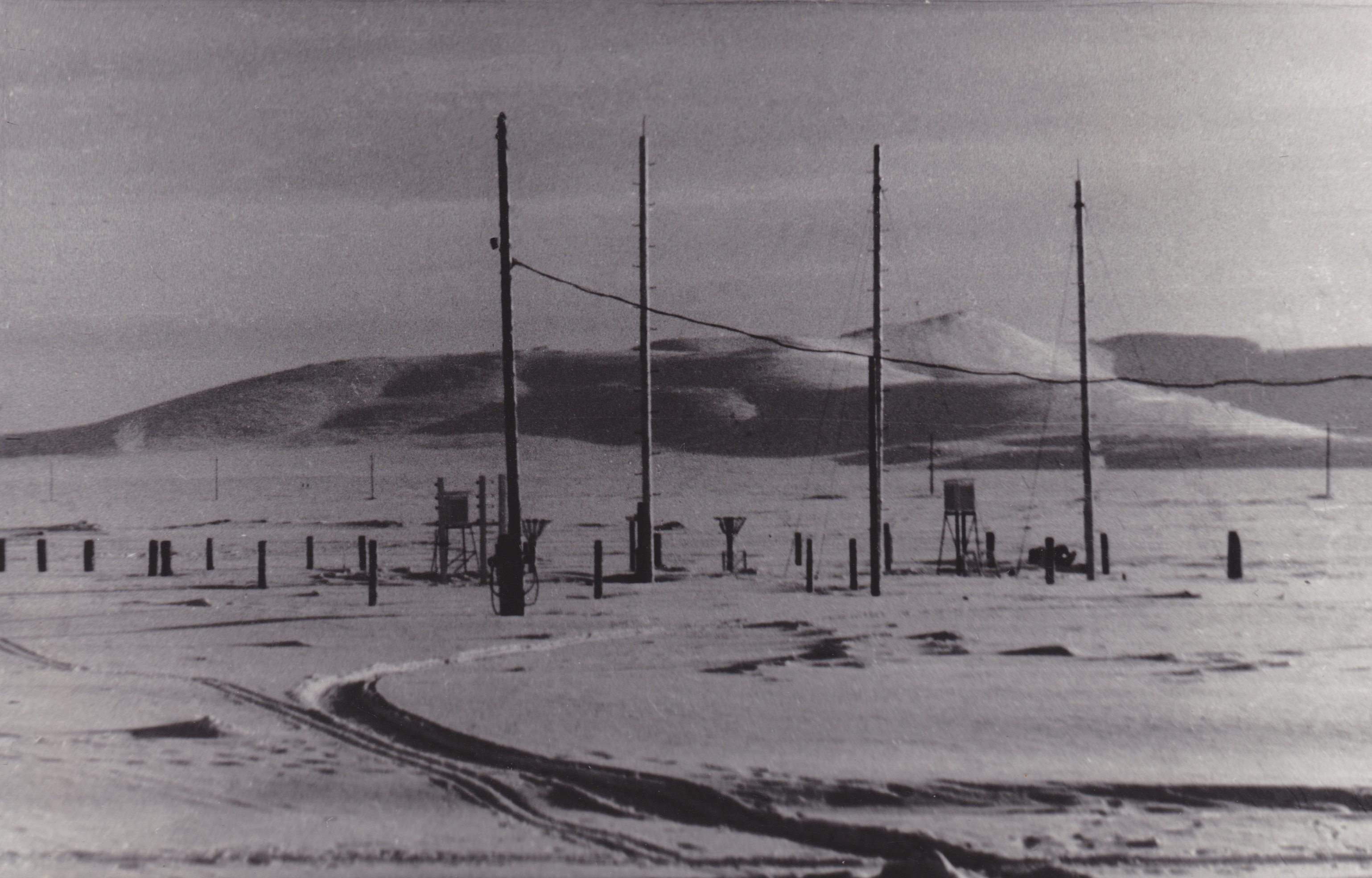
View of Dome Mountain

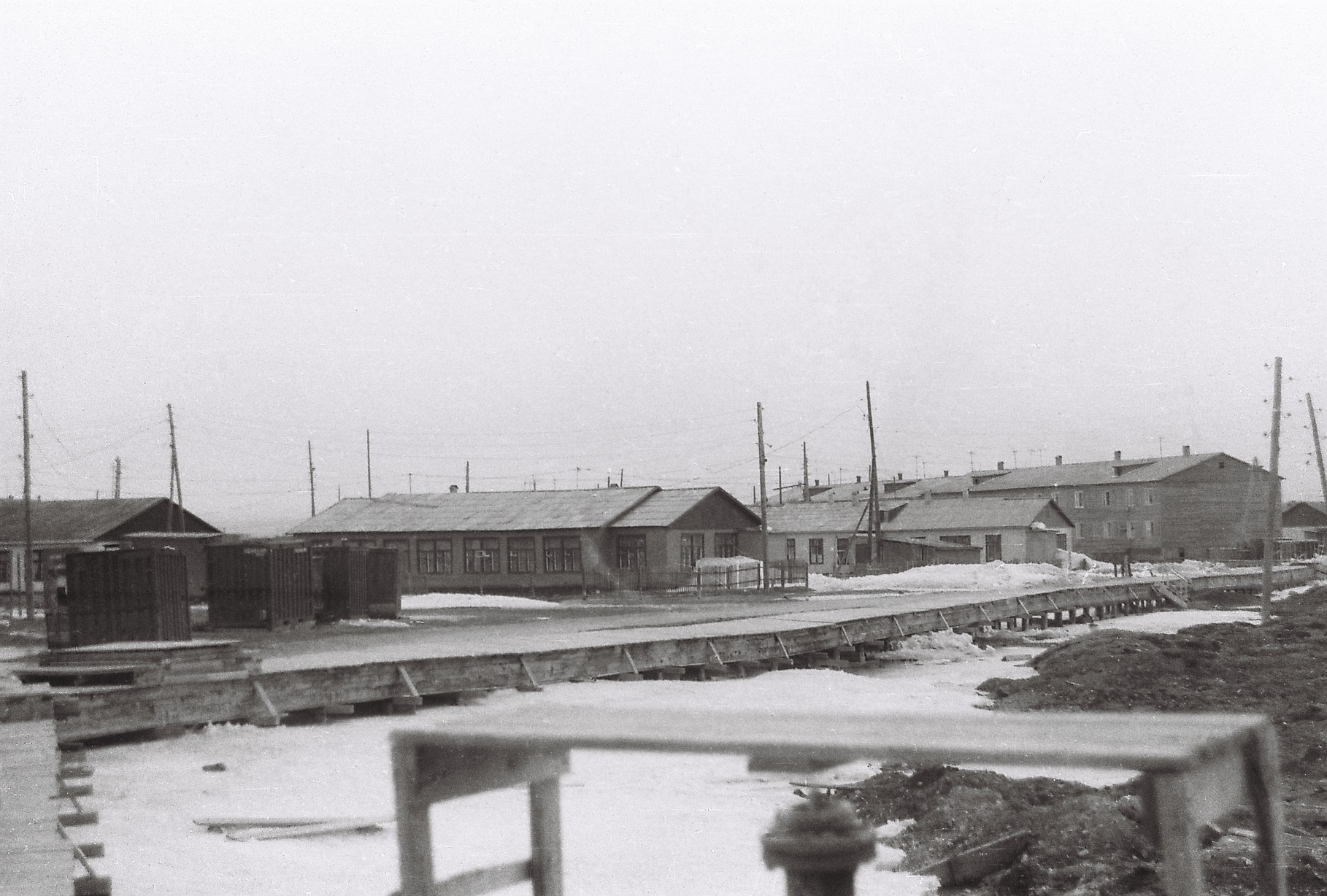
Kindergarten

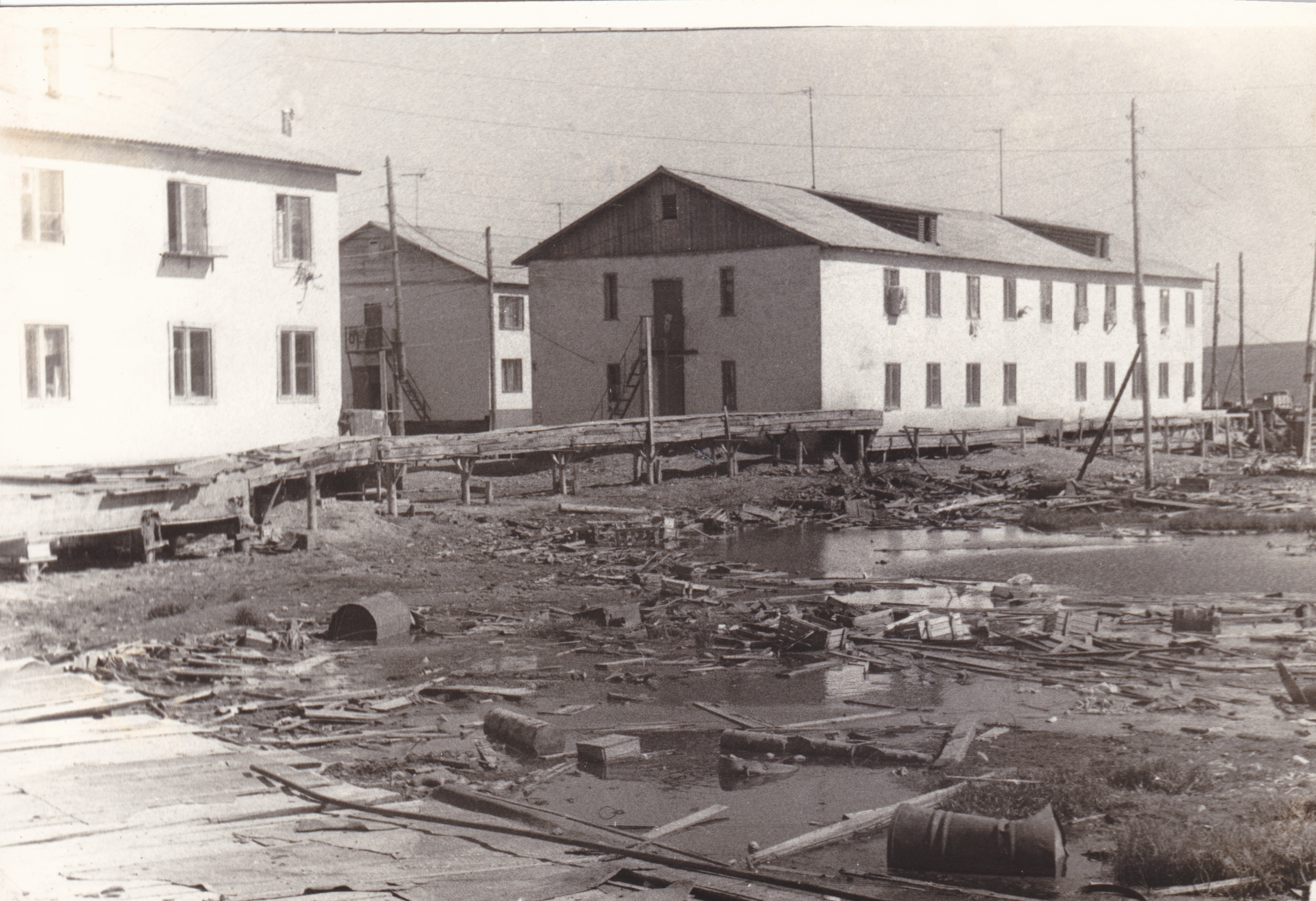
"Intelligence" Quarter

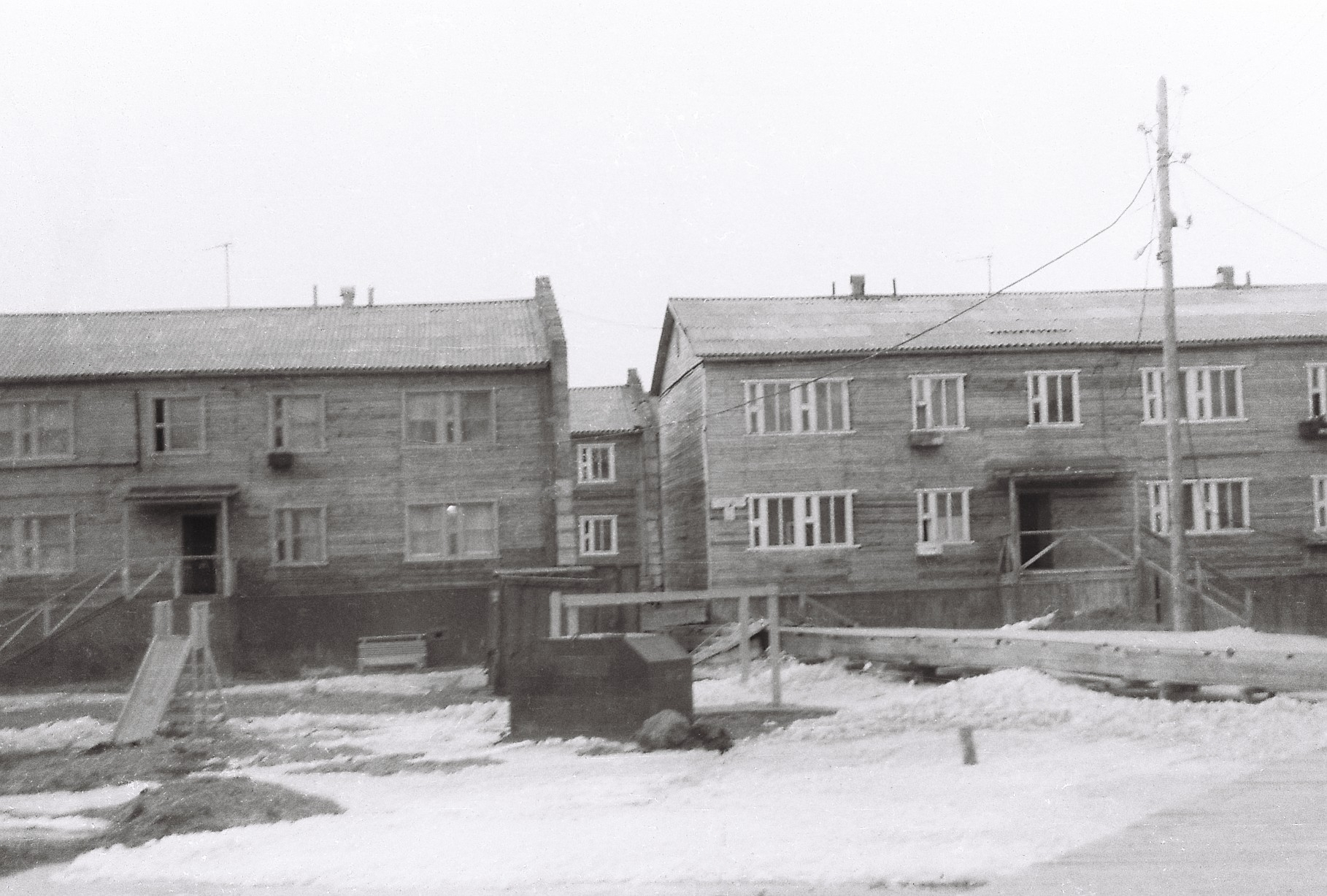
Gaidara Street

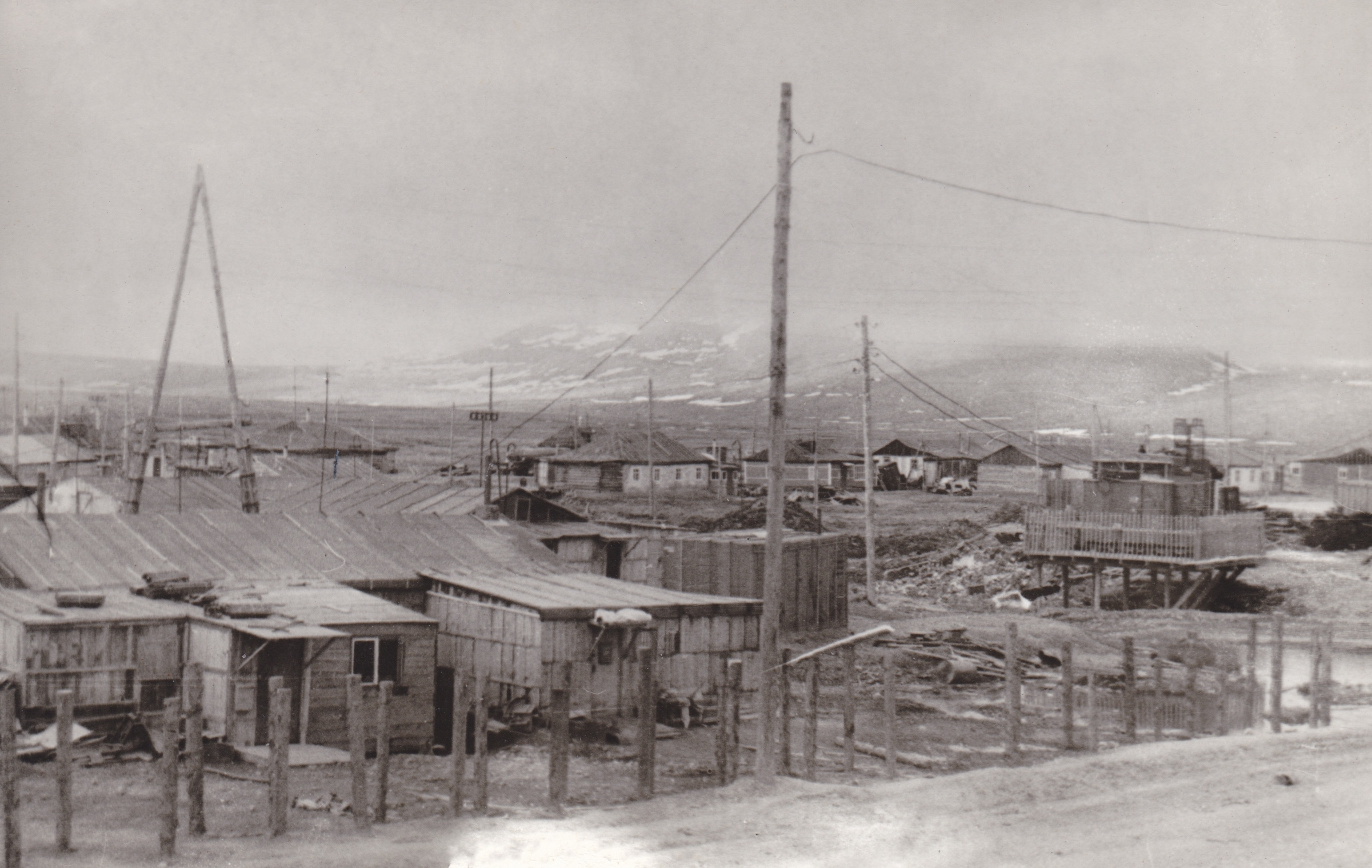
"Shanghai", the southern outskirts of the settlement
