= Amguema =

Amguema Амгуэма Оʼмваам (Chukchi)
- Selo
- Interactive map of Amguema
- Location of Amguema Amguema (Chukotka Autonomous Okrug)
- Coordinates: 67°01′N 178°14′W
- Country: Russia
- Federal subject: Chukotka Autonomous Okrug
- Administrative district: Iultinsky District
- Elevation: 138 m (453 ft)

Population (2010 Census)
  - Total: 531
  - Estimate (January 2016): 416 (−21.7%)

Municipal status
  - Municipal district: Iultinsky Municipal District
  - Rural settlement: Amguema Rural Settlement
  - Capital of: Amguema Rural Settlement
- Time zone: UTC+12 (MSK+9)
- Postal code: 689210
- Dialing code: +7 42734
- OKTMO ID: 77715000106

Amguema (Russian: Амгуэма; Chukchi: Оʼмваам, Oʼmvaam) is a village (selo) in Iultinsky District of Chukotka Autonomous Okrug, in the Far Eastern Federal District of Russia. Population: 531 (2010 census); the village is based on the Iultin-Egvekinot road, one of the few significant roads in the Okrug. Reindeer herding is the most significant economic activity in the village. Municipally, Amguema is subordinated to Iultinsky Municipal District and incorporated as Amguema Rural Settlement.

== Demographics ==
The most recent census figures show a population of 531, of which 279 are men and 252 women. The village is a traditional Chukchi settlement, in which most of the citizens are reindeer herders, taking advantage of the pasture present around the river Amguema (Chukchi: O'mvaam). It is the only native settlement in the district to have a stable economy, thanks in part to the available land. The population as of 2006 was 570, up slightly on the 2003 estimate of 548, of whom 387 were indigenous peoples and of those 379 of them were Chukchi.

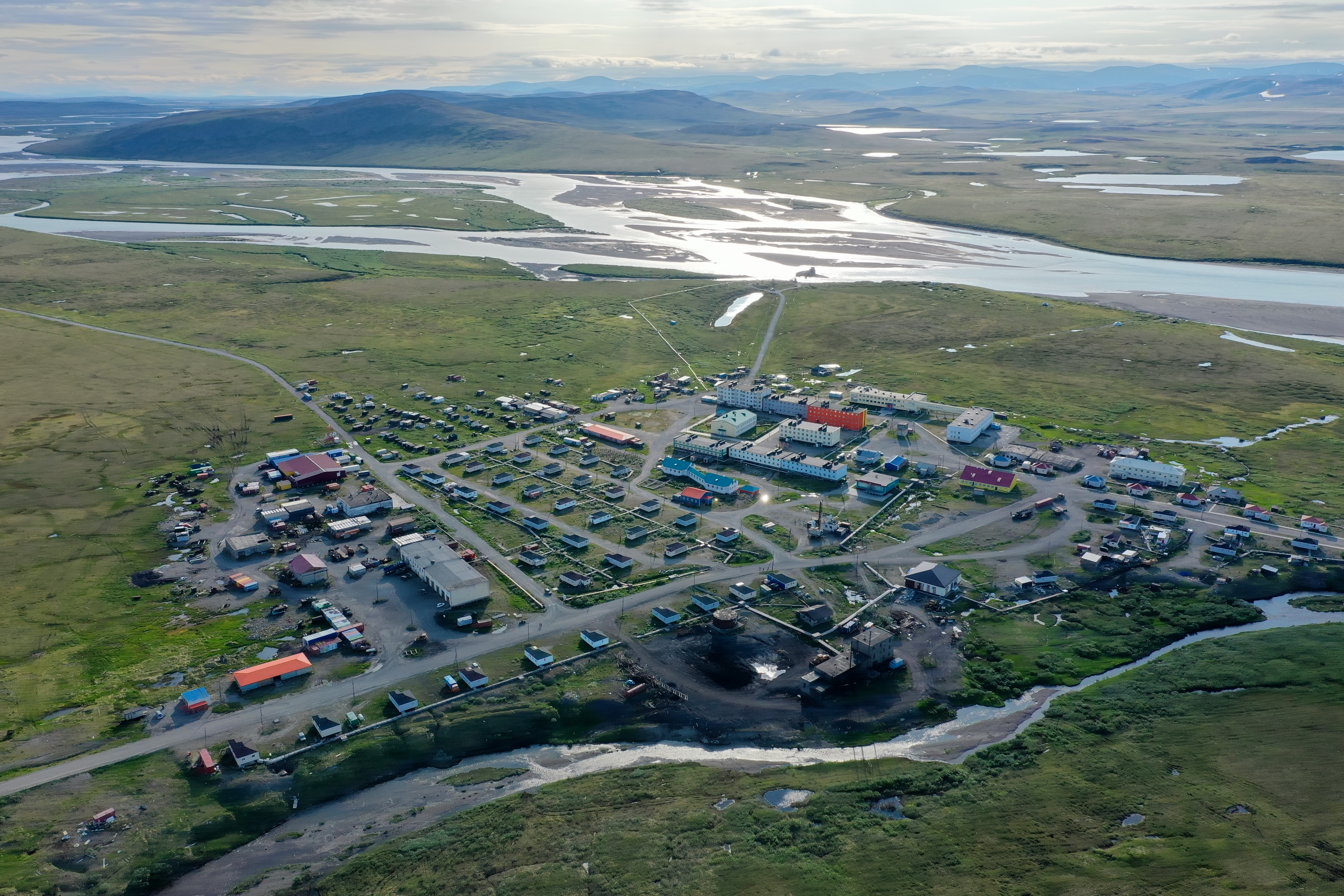
Aerial view of Amguema, 2025

== Culture ==
In August, the village is the host of the Vylgynkoranymat festival (lit. young reindeer festival), during which time, a slaughter occurs so that the residents may have sufficient skins for clothing for the forthcoming winter. At the end of the festival, the women of the village produce a dish called kivlet, boiled reindeer stomachs, complete with their undigested final meal to which venison, blood and onions are added and is said to resemble goulash when cooked.

As with many of the settlements in Chukotka, there are neolithic remains to be found in the area surrounding the village.

== Economy ==
The inhabitants of Amguema survive almost entirely through reindeer husbandry and the Sovkhoz, with 11,166 head, is thought to have the second-largest number of reindeer in the whole Okrug, looked after by six brigades, the structure a remnant of the Soviet era. Each brigade is responsible for between 760 and 3710 reindeer.

In an area where land-based transport is scarce, the village is fortunate to be connected to one of the few roads, being situated about halfway along the paved road that runs from Egvekinot in the south, to the former mining village of Iultin, on the 91st kilometer. The majority of the population are reindeer herders, with 84 people working on the tundra in 2003.

Beyond the comparative ease with which inhabitants of Amguema can reach the outside world, the village has also been a major beneficiary of the money spent on the region by the former governor, Roman Abramovich. The village has a boarding school for all ages, which is a rarity in the region, and the village serves as an educational hub for the surrounding villages whose schools do not cover all age groups. As well as the school, Abramovich funded the construction of 46 new homes, at a cost of nearly $2.5 million, with hot water and indoor facilities, as well as a guesthouse, barbers and banya. There is also a food store, a post-office, a daycare center and a bakery. The school in Amguema is a boarding school and is used to educate not only the children from village but also other children from Nutepelmen and Vankarem, who are sent there when they are seven or eight.

=== Transport ===
Amguema is situated on the Iultin-Egvekinot road, one of the few permanent roads in Chukotka. Within the village, there is also a small road network including:

- улица Восточный (Ulitsa Vostochniy, lit. East Street)
- улица Западный (Ulitsa Zapadniy, lit. West Street)
- улица Магистральная (Ulitsa Magistralnaya, lit. Trunk Street)
- улица Набережная (Ulitsa Naberezhnaya, lit. Quay Street)
- улица Северная (Ulitsa Severnaya, lit. North Street)
- улица Центральная (Ulitsa Tsentralnaya, lit. Central Street)

== Amguema in Russian Naval history ==
A class of polar cargo ships was first developed in 1962 and named Anguema after the village. This was the first new class of ULA (the Russian abbreviation for "strengthened for arctic ice") a continuation of the Lena class of icebreaker to all intents and purposes, and was felt to have a hull shape far superior to any type of ice breaker constructed to that date.

The first of this class of ship named after the village, a polar cargo ship, was among a number of Russian cargo ships and ice-breakers stuck in ice at Kosa Dvukh Pilotov in 1983 on a journey from Magadan to Mys Shmidta, when the winter sea ice formed significantly earlier than usual.

== Climate ==
Amguema, similarly to Egvekinot, has a transitional polar tundra/subarctic climate (Dfc/ET) with bitterly cold, very long winters and very short, cool summers.

Climate data for Amguema (1955-1995)
Month	Jan	Feb	Mar	Apr	May	Jun	Jul	Aug	Sep	Oct	Nov	Dec	Year
Record high °C (°F)	4.2 (39.6)	2.0 (35.6)	2.3 (36.1)	7.1 (44.8)	14.0 (57.2)	29.7 (85.5)	29.6 (85.3)	27.0 (80.6)	18.4 (65.1)	8.7 (47.7)	11.7 (53.1)	3.9 (39.0)	29.7 (85.5)
Mean daily maximum °C (°F)	−21.8 (−7.2)	−24.8 (−12.6)	−21.6 (−6.9)	−13.9 (7.0)	−1.7 (28.9)	11.4 (52.5)	16.5 (61.7)	12.6 (54.7)	4.4 (39.9)	−7.5 (18.5)	−15.4 (4.3)	−22.1 (−7.8)	−7.0 (19.4)
Daily mean °C (°F)	−25.7 (−14.3)	−28.6 (−19.5)	−26.0 (−14.8)	−18.8 (−1.8)	−5.5 (22.1)	6.2 (43.2)	10.6 (51.1)	7.4 (45.3)	0.6 (33.1)	−10.8 (12.6)	−19.2 (−2.6)	−25.9 (−14.6)	−11.3 (11.7)
Mean daily minimum °C (°F)	−29.7 (−21.5)	−32.4 (−26.3)	−30.0 (−22.0)	−23.3 (−9.9)	−9.2 (15.4)	1.5 (34.7)	5.5 (41.9)	3.3 (37.9)	−2.4 (27.7)	−14.4 (6.1)	−23.2 (−9.8)	−29.8 (−21.6)	−15.3 (4.4)
Record low °C (°F)	−49.1 (−56.4)	−50.9 (−59.6)	−48.7 (−55.7)	−39.9 (−39.8)	−30.8 (−23.4)	−14.7 (5.5)	−3.1 (26.4)	−9.5 (14.9)	−18.5 (−1.3)	−36.2 (−33.2)	−44.7 (−48.5)	−46.4 (−51.5)	−50.9 (−59.6)
Average precipitation mm (inches)	46.0 (1.81)	31.4 (1.24)	18.2 (0.72)	18.8 (0.74)	14.8 (0.58)	28.0 (1.10)	47.2 (1.86)	54.9 (2.16)	40.4 (1.59)	30.9 (1.22)	34.3 (1.35)	39.9 (1.57)	404.8 (15.94)
Average precipitation days	17.0	12.9	11.5	11.2	9.5	9.4	12.8	14.1	13.3	16.1	16.1	15.5	159.4
Mean monthly sunshine hours	9	74	183	239	226	310	249	153	98	62	19	2	1,624

== See also ==
- List of inhabited localities in Iultinsky District
