= Kosa Dvukh Pilotov Island =

Island in Russia

Kosa Dvukh Pilotov
Russian: коса Двух Пилотов
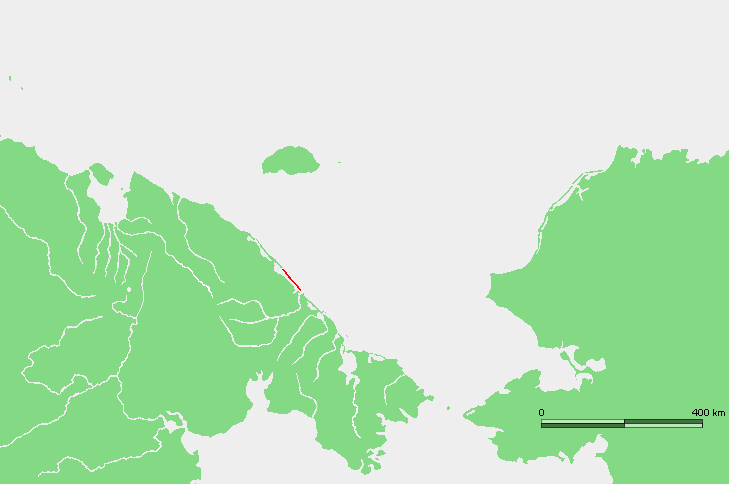
- Location of long Kosa Dvukh Pilotov Island off Tynkurgin and Tynkergynpil'gyn lagoons.

Geography
- Coordinates: 68.426°N 177.966°E
- Length: 52.5 km (32.62 mi)
- Width: 1 km (0.6 mi)

Administration
- Russia

Demographics
- Population: 0

Kosa Dvukh Pilotov Island (коса Двух Пилотов, "Two Pilots' Sandspit") is a long and narrow island in the Chukchi Sea. It is located along the coast of the Chukotka Peninsula in the Chukotka Autonomous Okrug.

This island is 52.5 km (32.6 mi) in length but only 1 km (0.62 mi) wide on average. It is a long extended bar or spit between the Chukchi Sea and the lagoons of Amguema (Амгуэма) and Tynkergynpil'gyn (Тынкэргынпильгын), coastal lakes which are frozen most of the year.

The island is named after pilot Carl Ben Eielson and mechanic Earl Borland who crashed near it in 1929.

The southeastern section of this island is also known as "Ostrov Dalstroy" after the Soviet organization Dalstroy.

== See also ==
- List of islands of Russia
