= Nutepelmen =

Nutepelmen Нутэпэльмен Нутэпылмын (Chukchi)
- Selo
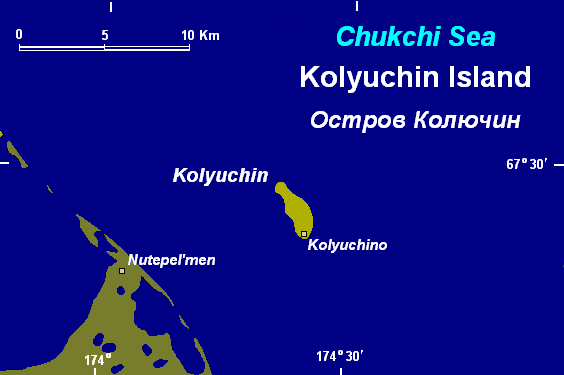
- Location of Nutepelmen in relation to Kolyuchin Island
- Interactive map of Nutepelmen
- Location of Nutepelmen Nutepelmen (Chukotka Autonomous Okrug)
- Coordinates: 67°01′N 174°58′W
- Country: Russia
- Federal subject: Chukotka Autonomous Okrug
- Administrative district: Iultinsky District

Population (2010 Census)
  - Total: 157
  - Estimate (January 2016): 158 (+0.6%)

Municipal status
  - Municipal district: Chaunsky District
- Time zone: UTC+12 (MSK+9)
- Postal code: 689235
- OKTMO ID: 77715000121

Nutepelmen (Russian: Нутэпэльмен; Chukchi: Нутэпылмын, Nutèpylmyn), is a village (selo) on the northern shores of Iultinsky District, Chukotka Autonomous Okrug, in the Far Eastern Federal District of Russia. The village is a traditional Chukchi and Yupik settlement in an area that has been inhabited for centuries. Whilst the village still exists, in 2010, a law was passed abolishing the municipal rural settlement of Nutepelmen, meaning that administration responsibilities passed to the central district administration.

== Geography ==
The village, population 135, as of 2006:, is formed mainly of Chukchi people, and is located on a spit at the entrance to Pyngopylkhyn Lagoon (from the Chukchi, Pynopelgyn, lit. "sucking orifice").

Kolyuchin Island is found to the north east of the village.

== History ==
=== Early history ===
Further along the coast, near the village, a stone circle can be found, dating from the sixteenth to seventeenth century when the Chukchi fought battles with the Cossack explorers. The skeletons of those killed in the battle can still be found on the surrounding tundra and the local Chukchi population regard the area as cursed. As well as the stone circle, on the eastern shore of Kolyuchinskaya Bay is the ancient Inuit village of Anayan (inhabitants transferred to Neshkan in the 1950s by Soviet authorities), where ruined houses still stand. the name of the village is derived from the Chukchi, meaning "Land in the Mist".

=== Recent history ===
On September 10, 2010, a law was passed abolishing Nutepelmen at municipal level. Nutepelmen as an entity continues to exist, but it is no longer a rural locality, this law stripped it of Selo status, it is simply an inhabited locality in the intra-settlement territory of Iultinsky municipal district. The right of the village to local government was removed and such responsibilities were taken over by Iultinsky municipal government on January 1, 2011. Iultinsky municipal government also took control of all municipal property, all municipal property rights and all local budgets on this date.

== Climate ==
Nutepelmen has an arctic tundra climate (ET) with long, bitterly cold and snowy winters and very short, chilly and wet summers.

Climate data for Nutepelmen/Kolyuchinskaya Bay
Month	Jan	Feb	Mar	Apr	May	Jun	Jul	Aug	Sep	Oct	Nov	Dec	Year
Record high °C (°F)	2.2 (36.0)	1.1 (34.0)	1.6 (34.9)	5.0 (41.0)	17.0 (62.6)	20.0 (68.0)	22.8 (73.0)	23.0 (73.4)	13.0 (55.4)	9.3 (48.7)	13.5 (56.3)	2.2 (36.0)	23.0 (73.4)
Mean daily maximum °C (°F)	−19.5 (−3.1)	−21.9 (−7.4)	−20.7 (−5.3)	−13.9 (7.0)	−3.1 (26.4)	4.8 (40.6)	8.7 (47.7)	7.0 (44.6)	2.5 (36.5)	−3.8 (25.2)	−11.3 (11.7)	−18.6 (−1.5)	−7.5 (18.5)
Daily mean °C (°F)	−22.0 (−7.6)	−24.5 (−12.1)	−23.2 (−9.8)	−16.7 (1.9)	−5.3 (22.5)	2.5 (36.5)	5.9 (42.6)	5.0 (41.0)	1.3 (34.3)	−5.5 (22.1)	−13.6 (7.5)	−21.0 (−5.8)	−9.8 (14.4)
Mean daily minimum °C (°F)	−24.5 (−12.1)	−27.0 (−16.6)	−25.7 (−14.3)	−19.4 (−2.9)	−7.4 (18.7)	0.1 (32.2)	3.1 (37.6)	2.9 (37.2)	0.1 (32.2)	−7.1 (19.2)	−15.8 (3.6)	−23.3 (−9.9)	−12.0 (10.4)
Record low °C (°F)	−41.8 (−43.2)	−42.2 (−44.0)	−41.1 (−42.0)	−34.6 (−30.3)	−22.8 (−9.0)	−11.1 (12.0)	−3.0 (26.6)	−7.0 (19.4)	−8.1 (17.4)	−26.9 (−16.4)	−33.3 (−27.9)	−37.8 (−36.0)	−42.2 (−44.0)
Average precipitation mm (inches)	46.8 (1.84)	53.5 (2.11)	39.0 (1.54)	29.3 (1.15)	76.6 (3.02)	63.4 (2.50)	53.7 (2.11)	66.0 (2.60)	106.1 (4.18)	94.4 (3.72)	90.6 (3.57)	41.2 (1.62)	760.6 (29.96)
Average precipitation days	4.1	4.6	4.7	4.1	5.7	4.4	4.3	4.3	4.8	6.4	5.2	3.3	55.9

== See also ==
- List of inhabited localities in Iultinsky District

== Notes ==
=== Sources ===
- Дума Чукотского автономного округа. Закон №40-ОЗ от 30 мая 2008 г. «О преобразовании муниципальных образований Иультинский муниципальный район и Шмидтовский муниципальный район и о внесении изменений в отдельные законодательные акты Чукотского автономного округа», в ред. Закона №85-ОЗ от 20 октября 2010 г «Об упразднении сельского поселения Нутэпэльмен Иультинского муниципального района Чукотского автономного округа и о внесении изменений в отдельные законодательные акты Чукотского автономного округа». Вступил в силу через десять дней со дня официального опубликования. Опубликован: "Ведомости", №22/1 (349/1), 6 июня 2008 г. (Duma of Chukotka Autonomous Okrug. Law #40-OZ of May 30, 2008 On the Transformation of the Municipal Formations of Iultinsky Municipal District and Shmidtovsky Municipal District an on Amending Several Legislative Acts of Chukotka Autonomous Okrug, as amended by the Law #85-OZ of October 20, 2010 On Abolishing of Nutepelmen Rural Settlement of Iultinsky Municipal District of Chukotka Autonomous Okrug and on Amending Several Legislative Acts of Chukotka Autonomous Okrug. Effective as of the day ten days after the official publication date.). (in Russian)
- McKnight, Tom L; Hess, Darrel (2000). "Climate Zones and Types". Physical Geography: A Landscape Appreciation. Upper Saddle River, NJ: Prentice Hall. ISBN 0-13-020263-0.
- M Strogoff, P-C Brochet, and D. Auzias Petit Futé: Chukotka (2006). "Avant-Garde" Publishing House
