= Iultinsky District =

Iultinsky District Иультинский район (Russian)
- District
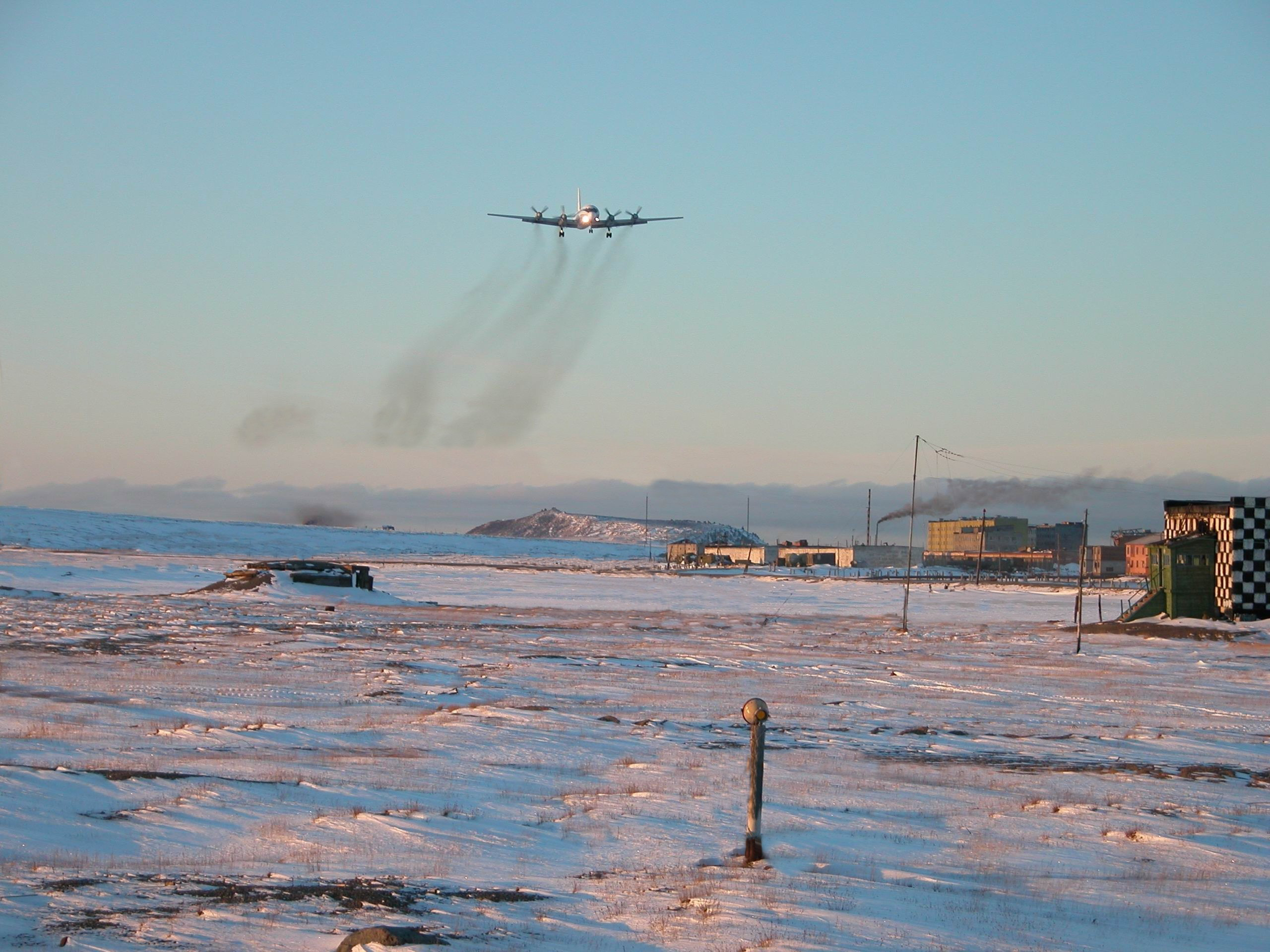
- Airplane with a trail of smoke in Iultinsky District

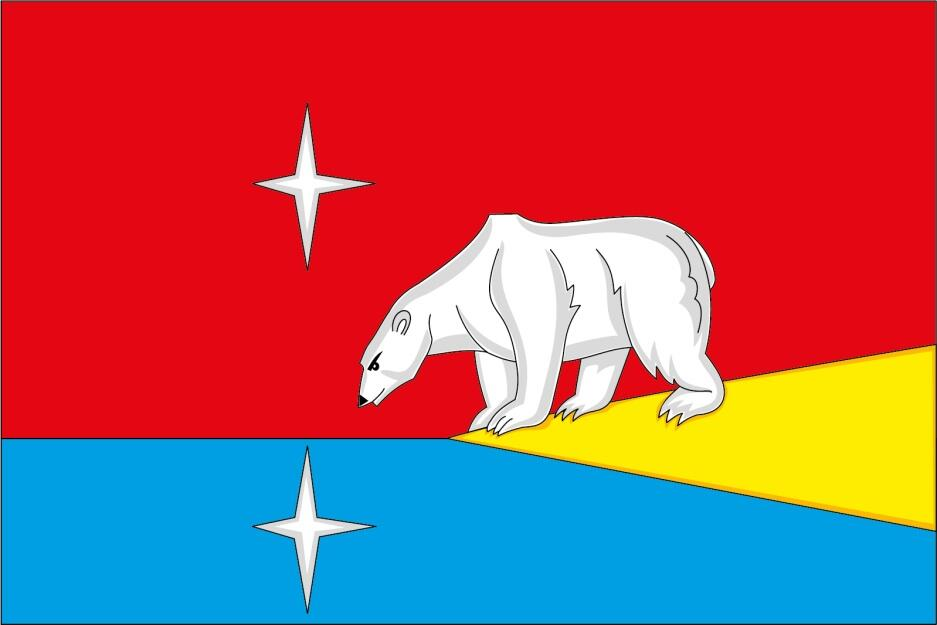
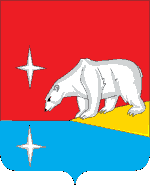
- Flag Coat of arms
- Location of Iultinsky District in Chukotka Autonomous Okrug
- Coordinates: 66°40′N 179°00′E
- Country: Russia
- Federal subject: Chukotka Autonomous Okrug
- Established: December 2, 1953 MISCELLANEA----
- Administrative center: Egvekinot

Government
  - Type: Local government
  - Body: ----STATISTICS----
  - Head of Administration: Alexander Maximov

Area
  - Total: 134,600 km^{2} (52,000 sq mi)

Population (2010 Census)
  - Total: 4,329
  - Estimate (January 2016): 4,814
  - Density: 0.03216/km^{2} (0.08330/sq mi)
  - Urban: 64.4%
  - Rural: 35.6%

Administrative structure
  - Inhabited localities: 3 urban-type settlements, 8 rural localities

Municipal structure
  - Municipally incorporated as: Iultinsky Municipal District
  - Municipal divisions: 2 urban settlements, 5 rural settlements
- Time zone: UTC+12 (MSK+9)
- OKTMO ID: 77715000
- Holiday: ----ADMINISTRATIVE STATUS----
- Website: http://iultinsky.munrus.ru/

Iultinsky District (Russian: Иу́льтинский райо́н; Chukchi: Ивылтин район, Ivyltin rajon) is an administrative and municipal district (raion), one of the six in Chukotka Autonomous Okrug, Russia. It is located in the northeast of the autonomous okrug and borders with the Chukchi Sea in the north, Providensky District in the east, Gulf of Anadyr in the southeast, and with Anadyrsky District in the southwest. The area of the district is 134,600 square kilometers (52,000 sq mi). Its administrative center is the urban locality (an urban-type settlement) of Egvekinot. Population: 4,329 (2010 census); 3,974 (2002 census); 15,689 (1989 Soviet census). The population of Egvekinot accounts for 64.4% of the district's total population.

The territory of the modern district has been populated since the Paleolithic age, though indigenous people are outnumbered by ethnic Russians by over three to one. The district was once a major center for mining tin and tungsten at Iultin, with the infrastructure built by gulag prisoners, but these mines have proved uneconomical in recent years and closed with their associated settlements abandoned.

== Geography ==
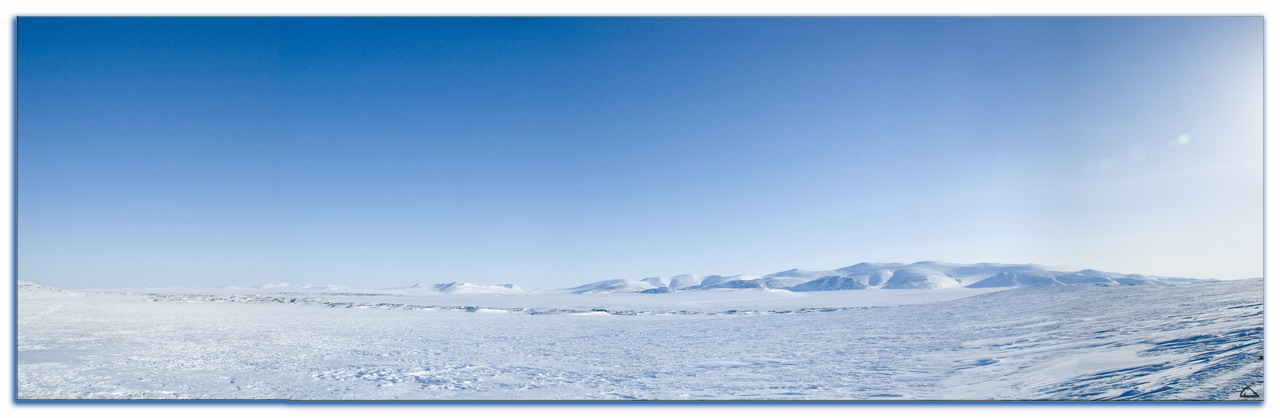
View of northern Iultinsky District between Polyarny and Leningradsky

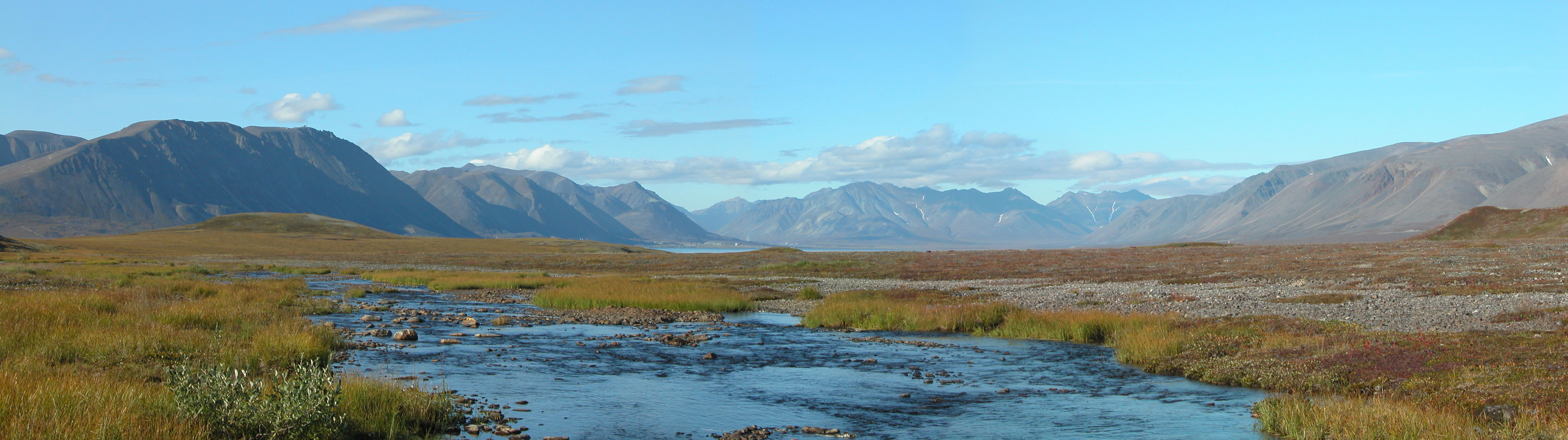
View of Southern Iultinsky District

Iultinsky District covers the northeastern part of the Chukchi Peninsula, except for its easternmost part, and touches two oceans. In the north, the district borders the Chukchi Sea and Wrangel Island. To the south lies the administrative center and small port of Egvekinot, located on the Kresta Bay of the Gulf of Anadyr. To the south of the Kresta Bay it reaches almost to the Anadyr Estuary.

The central part of the district is part of the Chukotka Mountains. The northwest is drained by the Amguema River. This valley is a key resource for the part of the population that does not live by the sea and contains the only significant stretch of road in the district, running from Egvekinot, through the indigenous locality of Amguema, to the now defunct mining settlement of Iultin. Other populated places in the district are only reachable either by sea or by helicopter. The main lakes in the district are Ekityki, Ervynaygytgyn and Yanranaygytgyn.

== History ==
=== Prehistory ===
It is thought that the area of what is now Iultinsky District was where the first people settled in Chukotka during the Paleolithic Age. Archaeological excavations have uncovered stone age camps and tools along the banks of both the Kymynanonvyaam and Maravaam Rivers.

A greater number of camps has been unearthed dating from the Neolithic Period along almost all the significant rivers in the district. Further excavations around Vankarem, Nutepelmen, and Uelkal indicate that there was a change in hunting practices during the 3rd millennium BCE as the native people began not only to follow migrating animals in the tundra, but also to hunt animals at sea. The locations of the archeological discoveries have established that the sea-fishing communities have been in existence in their current locations for a considerable period of time.

=== 17th–18th centuries ===
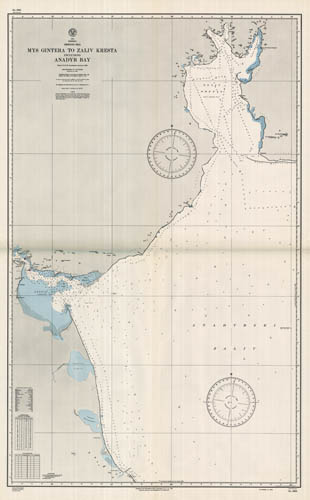
An old United States Navy map showing the Kresta Bay and Iultinsky District in the upper third and the Anadyrsky Liman to the southwest emptying into the Gulf of Anadyr

After Semyon Dezhnyov and his Cossack companions had established Anadyrsk in the 17th century, they began to explore the surrounding area and discovered the Kresta Bay in 1660, although it was not mapped properly until it was visited by Vitus Bering seventy years later.

=== 20th century ===
The district was founded on December 2, 1953. The economy on this territory received a major boost following the discovery in the 1930s of significant deposits of tin and tungsten in Mount Iultin. This discovery resulted in the creation of the settlement of Iultin. Initially the settlement was kept supplied by a convoy of tractors, but it was difficult to make significant progress and so to ensure the settlement could continue to be supplied, a road was built linking Egvekinot, Amguema, and Iultin.

During World War II, the territory played an important role in the Soviet supply chain, providing the eastern end of the Uelkal-Krasnoyarsk air route, used by Russia for the delivery of the Lend-Lease planes provide by the United States.

Following the end of World War II, Dalstroy used forced labor to build a port to help supply the mine, and in 1946, the MV Sovetskaya Latviya, one of a fleet of ships used by Dalstroy to transport prisoners to the Kolyma gulag, landed in the Kresta Bay to begin construction. Extreme conditions meant that, as in the construction of the Road of Bones, many prisoners died working and were buried where they fell and incorporated into the foundations of the port. Such bodies are still discovered during the spring thaw each year.

In order to provide the necessary power to the mines at Iultin, two power stations—one diesel, one steam-powered—were constructed in Ozyorny (now a microdistrict of Egvekinot); however, in recent years, mining in the region has proved impractical and the mines at Iultin were closed and the settlement abandoned, with the population moving to Egvekinot.

=== Mergers ===
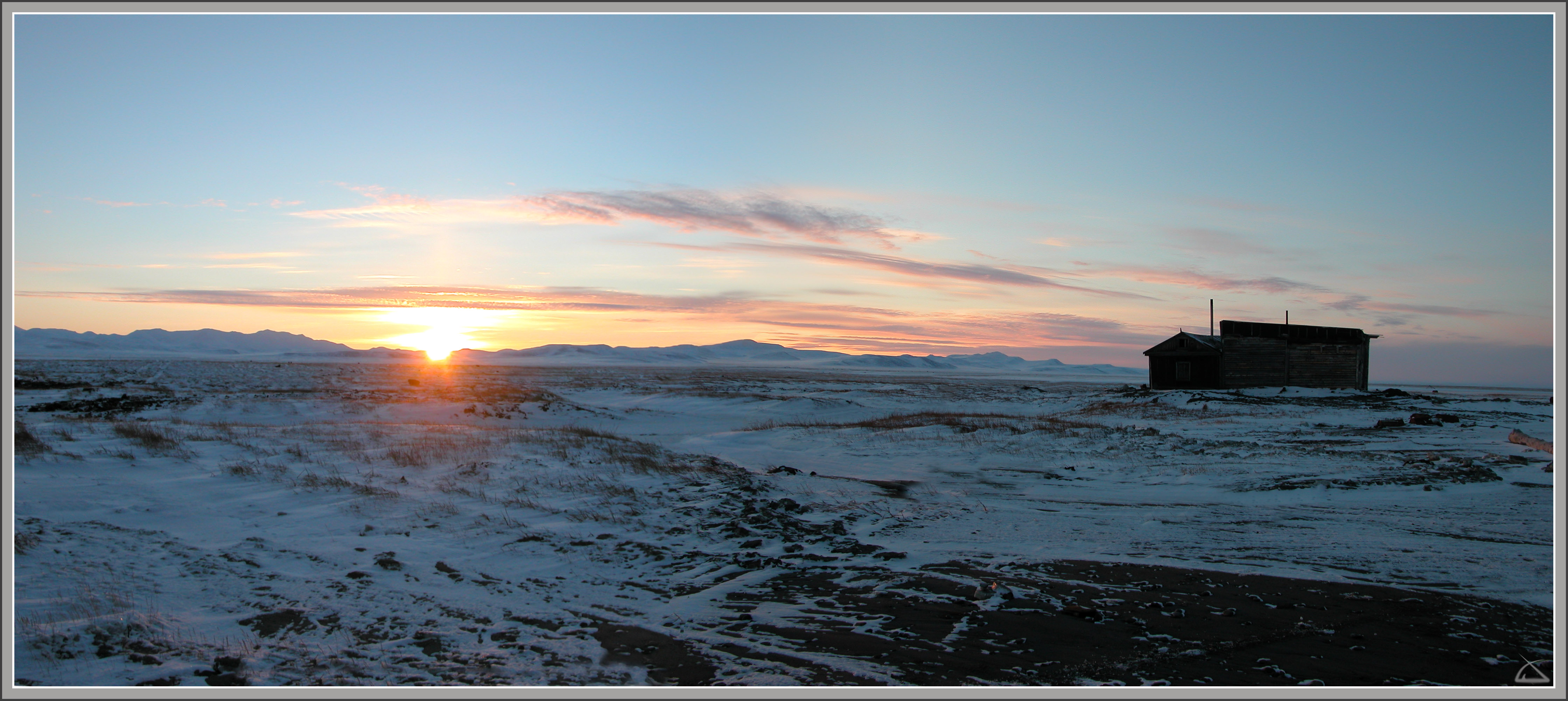
A Winter road in northern Iultinsky District

Before May 2008, Iultinsky Administrative District was municipally incorporated as Iultinsky Municipal District. In May 2008, Iultinsky and Shmidtovsky Municipal Districts were merged, forming an enlarged Vostochny Municipal District. This change, however, did not affect the administrative aspect of these districts. Both Iultinsky and Shmidtovsky Administrative Districts continued to exist separately.

In October 2008, the law mandating the change was amended and the name Vostochny was discarded with the combined municipal district being renamed Iultinsky Municipal District. Shmidtovsky Administrative District was merged into Iultinsky Administrative District effective June 13, 2011.

== Demographics ==
The population consists mainly of Russians, although Chukchi, the dominant native people in the district and other indigenous peoples such as Yupik make up about 24% of the total population. The district is bisected by both the Arctic Circle and the line of the 180° longitude.

== Economy ==
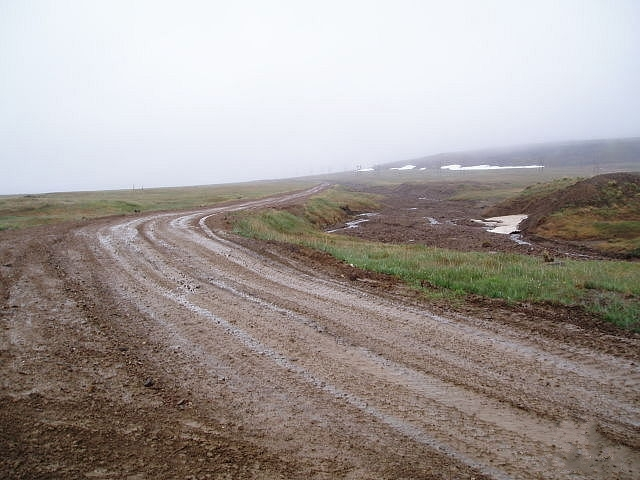
View on the road between the now abandoned settlements of Polyarny and Leningradsky in the far north of the district

The main center of economic activity is around Egvekinot and its Ozyorny Microdistrict, a former rural locality now abolished and merged with Egvekinot. This settlement contains the main sea port, a hydroelectric power plant, and the district's principal airport, with Chukotavia providing air service to all major airports within the autonomous okrug.

Outside of the main urban area of Egvekinot, the economy is driven mainly by either mineral extraction (the area is rich in pewter and wolframite as well as coal), traditional indigenous reindeer herding or sea-based hunting, with Chukchi farming centers such as Amguema, Vankarem, and Konergino holding nearly 25,000 head of reindeer in 2005. One of the settlements where marine hunting is the main economic driver, Uelkal, is the most westerly Eskimo settlement in the world.

=== Transportation ===
In addition to the airports, Iultinsky District also contains the longest road in Chukotka, which goes from Egvekinot to Iultin through indigenous settlements such as Amguema. There are also a number of winter and tractor roads which branch off from the main Iultinskaya Road serving settlements such as Svetly and Vostochny, as well as some of the geological and mining camps in the district.

== Administrative and municipal status ==
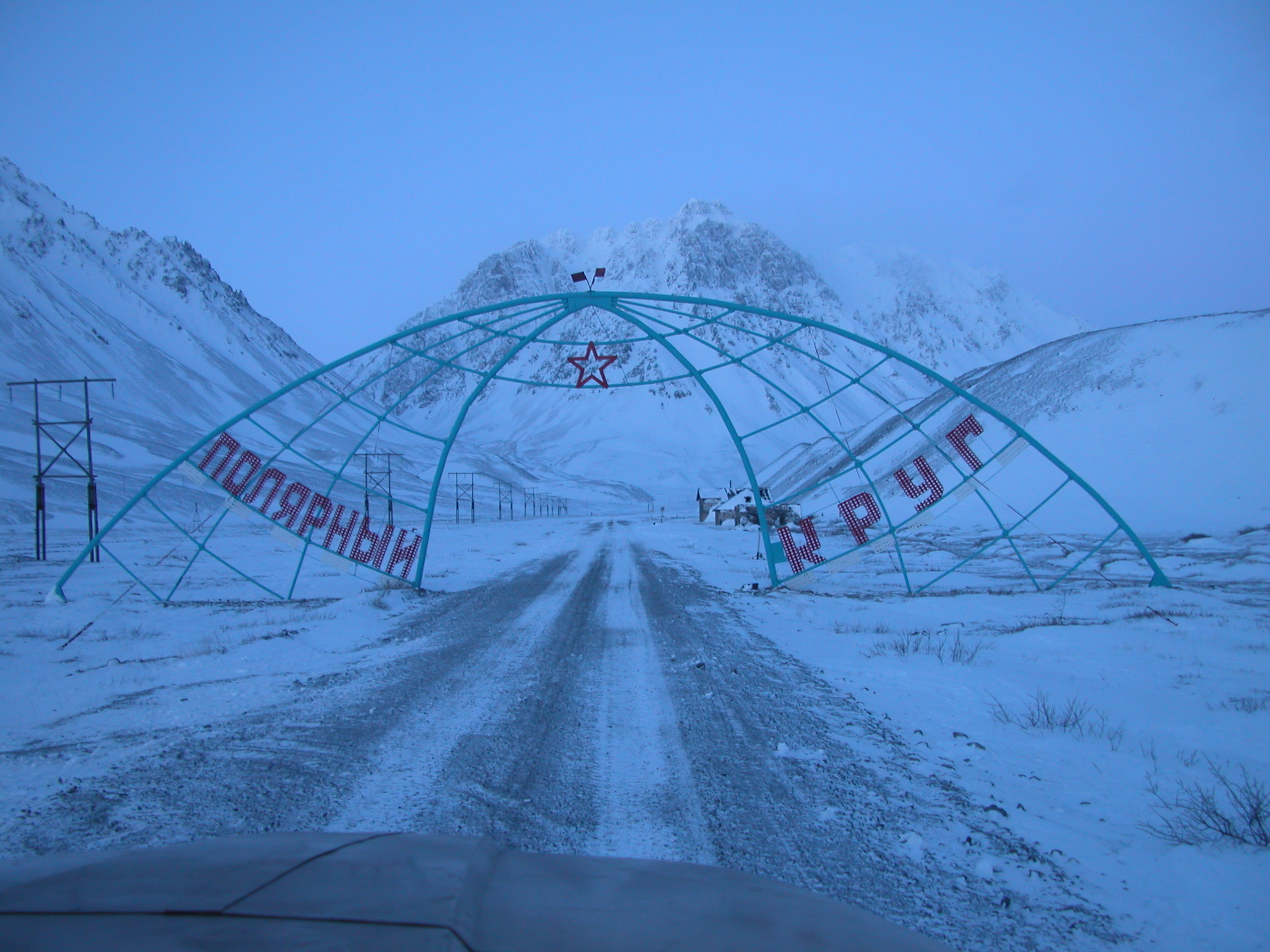
Crossing the Arctic Circle on the road between Iultin and Egvekinot

Within the framework of administrative divisions, Iultinsky District is one of the six in the autonomous okrug. The urban-type settlement of Egvekinot serves as its administrative center. The district does not have any lower-level administrative divisions and has administrative jurisdiction over three urban-type settlements and eight rural localities, consisting of all seven of the inhabited localities listed below in the "Inhabited localities" section and the rural locality of Billings.

As a municipal division, the district is incorporated as Iultinsky Municipal District and is divided into two urban settlements and five rural settlements. The rural locality of Billings, which is administratively a part of Iultinsky District, is, however, municipally a part of Chaunsky Municipal District.

=== Inhabited localities ===
Municipal composition
Urban settlements	Population	Male	Female	Inhabited localities in jurisdiction
Egvekinot (Эгвекинот)	2790	1364 (48.9%)	1426 (51.1%)	urban-type settlement of Egvekinot (administrative center of the district, includes Ozyorny Microdistrict)
Mys Shmidta (Мыс Шмидта)	492	284 (57.7%)	208 (42.3%)	urban-type settlement of Mys Shmidta
Rural settlements	Population	Male	Female	Rural localities in jurisdiction*
Amguema (Амгуэма)	531	279 (52.5%)	252 (47.5%)	**selo of Amguema**
Konergino (Конергино)	424	216 (50.9%)	208 (49.1%)	**selo of Konergino**
Ryrkaypiy (Рыркайпий)	766	388 (50.7%)	378 (49.3%)	**selo of Ryrkaypiy**
Uelkal (Уэлькаль)	243	125 (51.4%)	118 (48.6%)	**selo of Uelkal**
Vankarem (Ванкарем)	184	98 (53.3%)	86 (46.7%)	**selo of Vankarem**
Inhabited localities in the inter-settlement territory
selo of Nutepelmen
Inhabited localities being liquidated
urban-type settlement of Leningradsky; urban-type settlement of Polyarny; selo of Ushakovskoye

Divisional source:
Population source:
*Administrative centers are shown in bold
