= Leningradsky, Chukotka Autonomous Okrug =

Leningradsky Ленинградский
- Urban-type settlement (abolished)
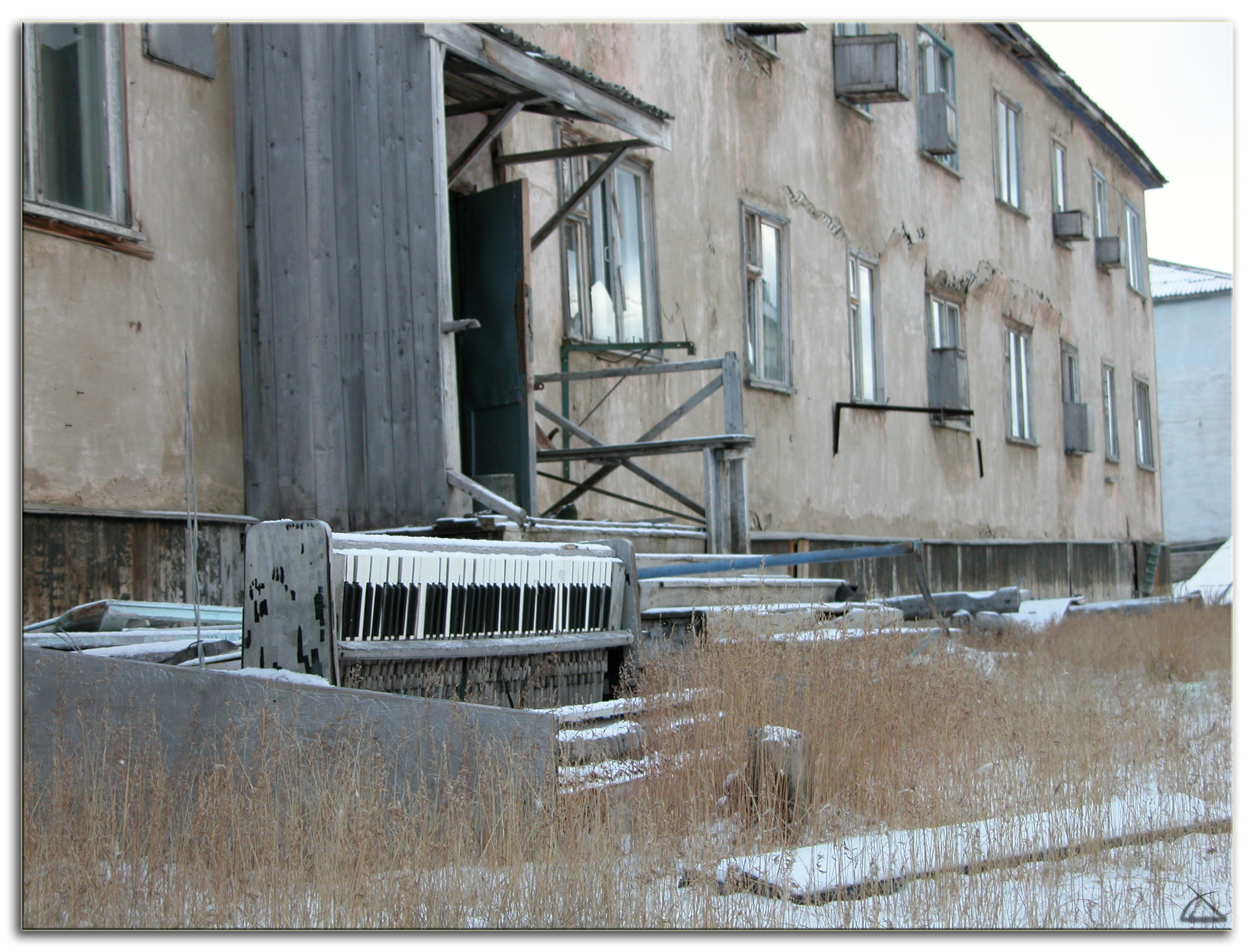
- Abandoned apartment block and piano in Leningradsky
- Interactive map of Leningradsky
- Location of Leningradsky Leningradsky (Chukotka Autonomous Okrug)
- Coordinates: 69°22′06″N 178°25′00″E
- Country: Russia
- Federal subject: Chukotka Autonomous Okrug
- Administrative district: Iultinsky District
- Founded: 1966
- Abolished: 1998

Population
  - Estimate (2002): 764 )

Municipal status
  - Municipal district: Iultinsky District
- Time zone: UTC+12 (MSK+9)
- Postal code: 689365
- OKTMO ID: 77715000061

Leningradsky (Russian: Ленингра́дский) is an urban locality (an urban-type settlement) in Iultinsky District of Chukotka Autonomous Okrug, Russia, about 80 kilometers (50 mi) west of Mys Shmidta. Population: 764 (2002 census); 3,606 (1989 Soviet census).

== History ==
The settlement was founded in order to provide accommodation for the workers and administrators of the nearby gold mines. When it was decided that the mines were no longer economically viable, the settlement was slated to be officially liquidated in 1998, a few years after it was decided to liquidate the neighbouring settlement of Polyarny, another settlement established purely to exploit the mineral wealth of the area.

Once the mines were declared unprofitable and that there was no possibility of developing any other form of economy in 1999 and the settlement was closed along with a number of others in Chukotka. The Russian government guaranteed funds to transport non-working pensioners and the unemployed in liquidated settlements including Leningradsky from Chukotka to other parts of Russia. The Ministry of railways was obliged to lease containers for the transportation of the migrants' goods to the Chukotkan administration and ensure that they were delivered to the various settlements. The population table below shows the impact on the settlement as a result of the closure of the mines.

Demographic Evolution
1979	1989	2002
2665	3606	764

The population was moved to other regions within the country however, due to a lack of suitable housing in many of these regions there was still a small population living in the settlement in 2000, hoping to become eligible for housing subsidy.

In 2005, there was a rebellion by a group of soldiers in the region. Drunk and bored with their duties in the far north, they took weapons and vodka and went to Leningradsky, seized the local store there and began to have a party, drinking and firing shots into the air. The police and FSB were notified and a seven-hour battle took place with fatalities on both sides before the rebellion was quashed.

== Economy ==
The population's occupations are primarily fishing in the nearby Chukchi Sea and gold mining, with the region's three main prospecting teams – Polyarnaya, Arktika and Shakhtar, being based in Leningradsky. Mys Shmidta Airport is located to the east of the town on the outskirts of Mys Shmidta and along with the port is the prime means of supply for the settlement. Leningradsky is currently in the process of being liquidated. The prospecting team Shakhtar has been employing about 50 men for the last two decades, mostly from Ukraine who spend six months a year working in Chukotka and then six back at home on the "mainland". The gold is mined alluvially, with a ton of rock having to be washed to produce a gram of gold.

=== Transport ===
Leningradsky is not connected by road to anywhere else but there is a small road system within the settlement, including:

- улица Ладного (Ulitsa Ladnogo)
- улица Молодежная (Ulitsa Molodezhnaya, lit. Youth Street)
- улица Октябрьская (Ulitsa Oktyabrskaya, lit October Street)
- улица Первооткрывателей (Ulitsa Pervoyotkrivateley, lit. Explorers Street)
- улица Прибрежная (Ulitsa Pribrezhnaya, lit. Coastal Street)
- улица Транспортная (Ulitsa Transportnaya, lit. Transport Street)
- улица Шахтерская (Ulitsa Shakhtyorskaya, lit. Miners Street)

== Climate ==
Leningradsky has a tundra climate (ET) with short, chilly summers and long, bitterly cold winters that last most of the year.

Climate data for Leningradsky, Chukotka Autonomous Okrug
Month	Jan	Feb	Mar	Apr	May	Jun	Jul	Aug	Sep	Oct	Nov	Dec	Year
Record high °C (°F)	−7.8 (18.0)	−0.7 (30.7)	1.8 (35.2)	5.2 (41.4)	9.7 (49.5)	25.7 (78.3)	26.9 (80.4)	18.9 (66.0)	16.4 (61.5)	4.7 (40.5)	12.3 (54.1)	−4.1 (24.6)	26.9 (80.4)
Mean daily maximum °C (°F)	−15.4 (4.3)	−15.9 (3.4)	−17.4 (0.7)	−11.8 (10.8)	−3.3 (26.1)	4.8 (40.6)	8.5 (47.3)	5.8 (42.4)	0.8 (33.4)	−6.2 (20.8)	−11.3 (11.7)	−14.3 (6.3)	−6.3 (20.7)
Mean daily minimum °C (°F)	−17.6 (0.3)	−18.2 (−0.8)	−21.1 (−6.0)	−16.4 (2.5)	−6.4 (20.5)	0.3 (32.5)	3 (37)	1.6 (34.9)	−1.8 (28.8)	−9.1 (15.6)	−13 (9)	−17.1 (1.2)	−9.6 (14.7)
Record low °C (°F)	−39 (−38)	−40.2 (−40.4)	−38.9 (−38.0)	−33 (−27)	−22.4 (−8.3)	−7 (19)	−13.2 (8.2)	−5.8 (21.6)	−16 (3)	−22.9 (−9.2)	−33.2 (−27.8)	−40 (−40)	−40.2 (−40.4)
Average snowy days	14	11	7	10	13	5	1	3	11	13	16	17	121

== See also ==
- List of inhabited localities in Iultinsky District
