= Ryrkaypiy =

Ryrkaypiy Рыркайпий Рыркампан (Chukchi)
- Selo
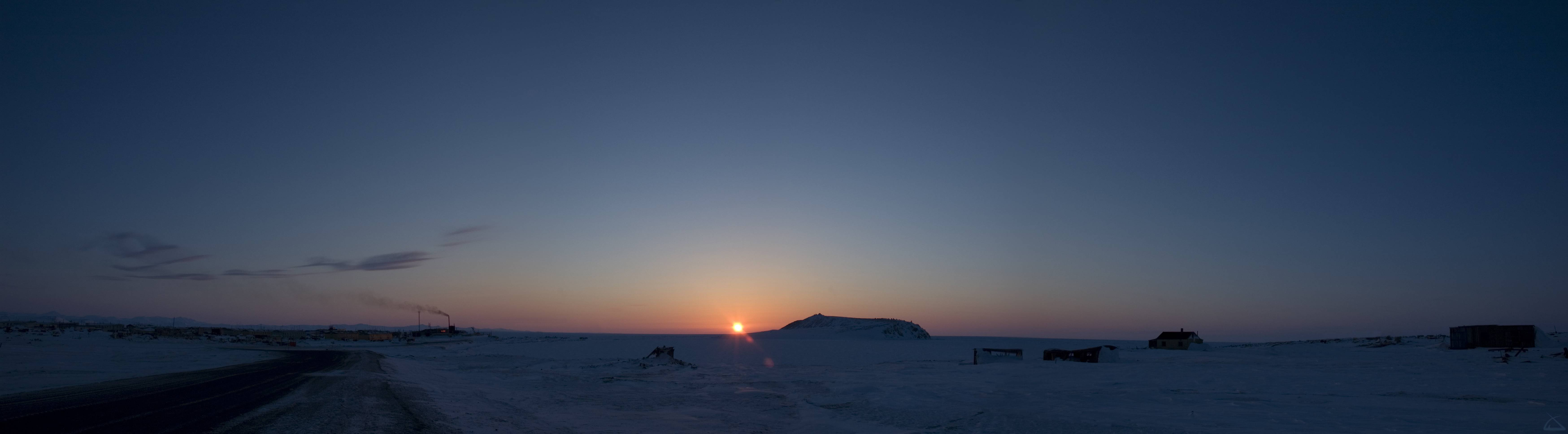
- Nighttime panorama of Ryrkaypiy
- Interactive map of Ryrkaypiy
- Location of Ryrkaypiy Ryrkaypiy (Chukotka Autonomous Okrug)
- Coordinates: 68°52′6″N 179°22′24″W
- Country: Russia
- Federal subject: Chukotka Autonomous Okrug
- Administrative district: Iultinsky District

Population (2010 Census)
  - Total: 766
  - Estimate (January 2016): 578 (−24.5%)

Municipal status
  - Municipal district: Iultinsky Municipal District
  - Rural settlement: Ryrkaypiy Rural Settlement
  - Capital of: Ryrkaypiy Rural Settlement
- Time zone: UTC+12 (MSK+9)
- Postal code: 689360
- Dialing code: +7 42739
- OKTMO ID: 77715000126

Ryrkaypiy (Russian: Рыркайпий; Chukot: Рыркампан, romanized: Ryrkampan) is a rural locality (a selo) just to the west of Mys Shmidta in Iultinsky District of Chukotka Autonomous Okrug, Russia. Municipally, Ryrkaypiy is incorporated as Ryrkaypiy Rural Settlement. Population: 766 (2010 census); .

== Demographics ==
The village is a small settlement, with a population of 766 as of 2010, of whom 388 were men and 378 women, up considerably from a 2003 estimate of 324. Most of the residents are of Chukchi descent.

== History and economy ==
The name of the village means "Place of the Walrus" in Chukchi, or "Walrus Jam", to convey the meaning that there are regularly large numbers of Walrus in the vicinity. Marine hunting has traditionally been a key source of food and employment for the local people.

As with several of the rural settlements throughout Chukotka, Ryrkaipiy was the centre for a collectivised farm centred on reindeer. It was the central farmstead for the largest of all the reindeer herding farms throughout Chukotka, named Pioneer. Unlike other rural settlements in Chukotka such as Alkatvaam in Beringovsky District and Tavaivaam in Anadyrsky District, following the collapse of the Soviet Union and payments to the farms from the government effectively ceased as Russia moved to a market economy, the workers on this farm were able to keep their reindeer herds going and these herds are still the major source of employment for the local people, despite living on the coast.

As with many Chukotkan villages, there are strong efforts made to keep the traditions of the indigenous peoples alive and although Ryrkaipiy has modern facilities such as a hospital, post office, high school and daycare centre there is also a traditional Chukchi ensemble and cultural centre and Northern Star Native Women's Club.

Towards the end of November 2017, the village received coverage in international news when the sudden death of a large amount of walrus, and the subsequent drift of the corpses towards the village, attracted a large number of polar bears, causing a state of high alert with children forbidden from walking to school and public events cancelled after one bear broke a window in a house.

=== Transport ===
Ryrkaypiy is connected to the outside world only via Mys Shmidta. From there, there is a road linking Mys Shmidta with Egvekinot. There is also a 435 kilometres (270 mi) unpaved road between Mys Shmidta and Komsomolsky, of which 235 kilometres (146 mi) is unpaved road and the remaining 199 kilometres (124 mi) is a snow road. Within the village, there is also a small network of roads including:

- улица Мира (Ulitsa Mira, lit. Peace Street)
- улица Пламенная (Ulitsa Plamennaya)
- улица Полярная (Ulitsa Polyarnaya, lit. Polar Street)
- улица Солнечная (Ulitsa Solnechnaya, lit. Solar Street)
- улица Строительная (Ulitsa Stroitelnaya, lit Construction Street)
- улица Тевлянто (Ulitsa Tevlyanto, lit Tevlyanto Street)
- улица Транспортная (Ulitsa Transportnaya, lit. Transport Street)
- улица Челюскинцев (Ulitsa Chelyuskintsev, lit Chelyuskin Street)
- улица Шмидта (Ulitsa Shmidta, lit Shmidt Street)

== Climate ==
Ryrkaypiy has a tundra climate (ET) where the warmest month has an average temperature between 0 °C (32 °F) and 10 °C (50 °F).

Climate data for Ryrkaipiy
Month	Jan	Feb	Mar	Apr	May	Jun	Jul	Aug	Sep	Oct	Nov	Dec	Year
Mean daily maximum °C (°F)	−20.1 (−4.2)	−24.2 (−11.6)	−21.5 (−6.7)	−14.0 (6.8)	−2.8 (27.0)	4.4 (39.9)	7.8 (46.0)	6.2 (43.2)	2.2 (36.0)	−5.4 (22.3)	−13.2 (8.2)	−19.9 (−3.8)	−8.4 (16.9)
Daily mean °C (°F)	−24.4 (−11.9)	−28.0 (−18.4)	−25.4 (−13.7)	−18.6 (−1.5)	−6.1 (21.0)	1.6 (34.9)	4.4 (39.9)	3.4 (38.1)	0.0 (32.0)	−8.7 (16.3)	−16.5 (2.3)	−23.7 (−10.7)	−11.8 (10.7)
Mean daily minimum °C (°F)	−28.6 (−19.5)	−31.7 (−25.1)	−29.3 (−20.7)	−23.1 (−9.6)	−9.4 (15.1)	−1.2 (29.8)	1.1 (34.0)	0.7 (33.3)	−2.1 (28.2)	−11.9 (10.6)	−19.7 (−3.5)	−27.5 (−17.5)	−15.2 (4.6)
Average precipitation mm (inches)	18 (0.7)	11 (0.4)	8 (0.3)	10 (0.4)	11 (0.4)	16 (0.6)	35 (1.4)	42 (1.7)	37 (1.5)	28 (1.1)	31 (1.2)	13 (0.5)	260 (10.2)

== See also ==
- List of inhabited localities in Iultinsky District
