= Kresta Bay =

Bay of the Gulf of Anadyr

- Залив Креста (Russian)
- Location of Kresta Bay in Chukotka

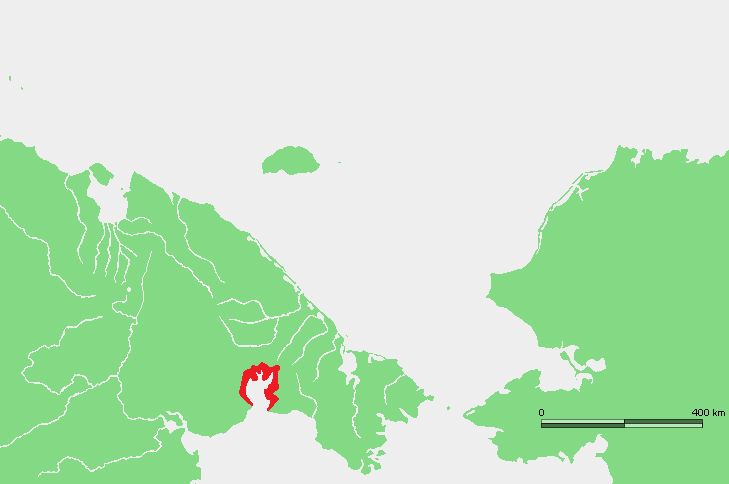
- Location: Far North
- Coordinates: 66.000°N 179.250°W
- River sources: Tnekveem
- Ocean/sea sources: Gulf of Anadyr
- Basin countries: Russia
- Max. length: 102 km (63 mi)
- Max. width: 43 km (27 mi)
- Average depth: 70 m (230 ft)
- Settlements: Egvekinot

Kresta Bay or Kresta Gulf (Russian: Залив Креста; Zaliv Kresta) is a large bay of the Gulf of Anadyr on the southern coast of the Chukotka Peninsula, Russian Federation. Administratively the bay is part of the Iultinsky District of Chukotka.

== Geography ==
The Kresta Bay is open towards the south; it is almost 100 km in length and has an average width of about 43 km. There are two inlets and a coastal lagoon enclosed by a landspit inside the bay.

Kresta Bay is now a tourist destination. Kresta Bay Airport, served by Chukotavia, is located by Egvekinot, a small harbor in the bay.

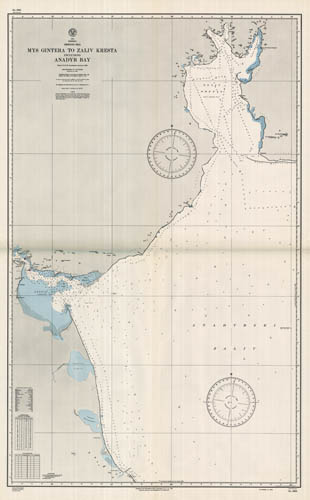
An old U.S. Navy map showing Kresta Bay on its upper right corner.

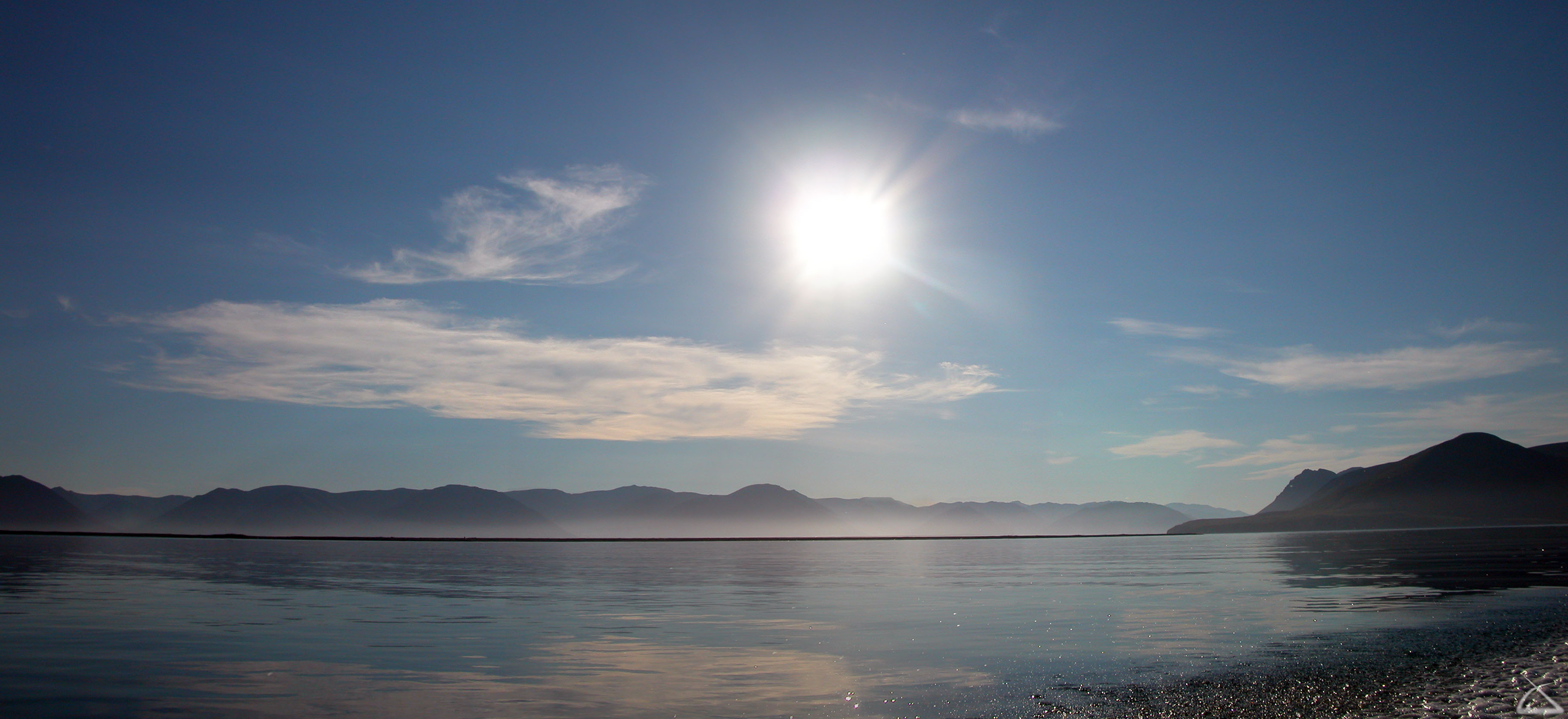
View of Kresta Bay.

== History ==
This bay was first surveyed by Russian mariner Count Fyodor Petrovich Litke in 1828.
