= Administrative divisions of Chukotka Autonomous Okrug =

Chukotka Autonomous Okrug Russia
- Administrative centre: Anadyr

Administrative structure (as of 2012)
- Districts: 6
- Cities/towns: 3
- Urban-type settlements: 18
- Selsovets: 0

Municipal structure (as of 2002)
- Rural settlements: 57 (inhabited); 16 (uninhabited)

Chukotka: 1. Anadyrsky District; 2. Bilibinsky District; 3. Iultinsky District; 4. Providensky District; 5. Chaunsky District; 6. Chukotsky District

Chukotka Autonomous Okrug is a federal subject of Russia.

== Administrative and municipal divisions ==
Chukotka Autonomous Okrug is administratively divided into:

- Towns under the autonomous okrug's jurisdiction:
  - Anadyr (Анадырь) (administrative center)
- Districts:
  - Anadyrsky (Анадырский)
    - Urban-type settlements under the district's jurisdiction:
      - Otrozhny (Отрожный)
      - Shakhtyorsky (Шахтёрский)
      - Ugolnye Kopi (Угольные Копи)
      - Beringovsky (Беринговский)
  - Bilibinsky (Билибинский)
    - Towns under the district's jurisdiction:
      - Bilibino (Билибино)
    - Urban-type settlements under the district's jurisdiction:
      - Aliskerovo (Алискерово)
      - Dalny (Дальний)
      - Vesenny (Весенний)
      - Vstrechny (Встречный)
  - Chaunsky (Чаунский)
    - Towns under the district's jurisdiction:
      - Pevek (Певек)
    - Urban-type settlements under the district's jurisdiction:
      - Baranikha (Бараниха)
      - Bystry (Быстрый)
      - Komsomolsky (Комсомольский)
      - Krasnoarmeysky (Красноармейский)
      - Valkumey (Валькумей)
      - Yuzhny (Южный)
  - Chukotsky (Чукотский)
    - Urban-type settlements under the district's jurisdiction:
      - Lavrentiya (Лаврентия)
  - Iultinsky (Иультинский)
    - Urban-type settlements under the district's jurisdiction:
      - Egvekinot (Эгвекинот)
      - Leningradsky (Ленинградский)
      - Mys Shmidta (Мыс Шмидта)
  - Providensky (Провиденский)
    - Urban-type settlements under the district's jurisdiction:
      - Provideniya (Провидения)

== Districts eliminated in 2011 ==
Chukotka as of before 2012: 1. Anadyrsky District; 2. Beringovsky District; 3. Bilibinsky District; 4. Iultinsky District; 5. Providensky District; 6. Chaunsky District; 7. Chukotsky District; 8. Shmidtovsky District

- Beringovsky District (Беринговский)
- Shmidtovsky District (Шмидтовский)
