= Baranikha =

Baranikha (Russian: Бараниха) is the name of several inhabited localities in Russia:

- Baranikha, Chukotka Autonomous Okrug, an urban locality (an urban-type settlement) in Chukotka Autonomous Okrug
- Baranikha, Ivanovo Oblast, a rural locality (a village) in Ivanovo Oblast
- Baranikha, Kharovsky District, Vologda Oblast
- Baranikha, Syamzhensky District, Vologda Oblast
- Baranikha, Vozhegodsky District, Vologda Oblast
- Baranikha, name of several other rural localities
