= Ayon =

Ayon may refer to:

== People ==
- Ayon (surname)

== Places ==
- Ayon, Russia, a rural locality (a selo) in Chaunsky District, Chukotka Autonomous Okrug, Russia
- Ayon Island, an island off the coast of Chukotka, Russia
