= Valkumey =

Valkumey Валькумей Вылӄыӈэй (Chukchi)
- Urban-type settlement (abolished)
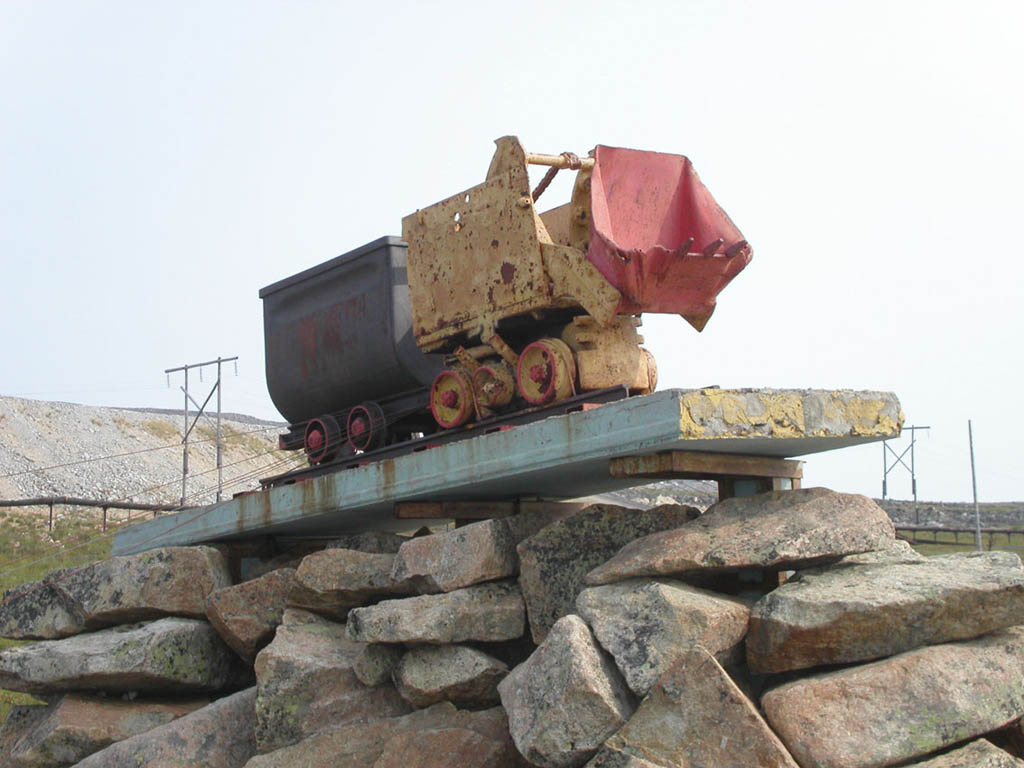
- Mine wagons in Valkumey
- Interactive map of Valkumey
- Location of Valkumey Valkumey (Chukotka Autonomous Okrug)
- Coordinates: 69°35′57″N 170°19′29″E
- Country: Russia
- Federal subject: Chukotka Autonomous Okrug
- Administrative district: Chaunsky District
- Founded: 1941
- Abolished: 1998

Population
  - Estimate (2002): 0 )
- Time zone: UTC+12 (MSK+9)
- Postal code: 689400
- OKTMO ID: 77705000062

Valkumey (Russian: Валькумей, Chukchi: Вылӄыӈэй, Vylḳyňèj, lit. "Coal Mountain") was an inhabited locality (an urban-type settlement) in Chaunsky District of Chukotka Autonomous Okrug, Russia, located on the shores of Chaunskaya Bay (part of the East Siberian Sea). Population: 0 (2002 Census); 3,906 (1989 Soviet census).

== History ==
Prior to the foundation of the settlement a preliminary expedition headed by a geologist called Dietmar was undertaken assessing the prospects of developing mining in the immediate area. He predicted that there were significant quantities of cassiterite-tin ore in the area, a prediction that was confirmed by later, more focussed, expeditions by larger teams of geologists.

Valkumey was founded in 1941 when mining began in this area, and the first few tons of tin were extracted from the Valkumey mine in the form of cassiterite. The mining was done almost entirely by prisoners of and exiles created by the Dalstroy GULAG system. Shortly after the opening of this mine, further tin mines opened near Pevek and Iultin, and mining became the major element of the Chukotkan economy. Valkumey became one of the major centres of tin mining in the Soviet Union, supplying a significant percentage of the tin required by the Soviet military.

By 1968, the population of the settlement had risen to 3,700. However, with the closure of the mine, the settlement was abandoned in 1998, with the remaining population moving to the town of Pevek, 12 kilometers (7.5 mi) up the coast to the north. As of 2009, Valkumey is included in the list of settlements currently in the process of being liquidated.

== Population ==
The mines were declared unprofitable and that there was no possibility of developing any other form of economy in 1999 and the settlement was closed along with a number of others in Chukotka. The Russian government guaranteed funds to transport non-working pensioners and the unemployed in liquidated settlements including Valkumey from Chukotka to other parts of Russia. The Ministry of railways was obliged to lease containers for the transportation of the migrants' goods to the Chukotkan administration and ensure that they were delivered to the various settlements. The population table below shows the impact on the settlement as a result of the closure of the mines.

Demographic Evolution
1959	1970	1979	1989	2002
2017	3059	3417	3906	0

== Transport ==
Valkumey is connected via a road network to Pevek, Komsomolsky and Krasnoarmeysky along with a number of other local settlements, but it is not connected by permanent road to any other part of the district or Chukotka. There is however, a small road network within the settlement including:

- Улица Горняцкая (Ulitsa Gornyatskaya)
- Улица Комсомольская (Ulitsa Komsomolskaya, lit. Komsomol Street)
- Улица Космонавтов (Ulitsa Kosmonavtov, lit. Cosmonaut Street)
- Улица Красноармейская (Ulitsa Krasnoarmeyskaya, lit Red Army Street)
- Улица Минерал (Ulitsa Mineral, lit. Mineral Street)
- Улица Рохлина (Ulitsa Rokhlina)
- Улица Северная (Ulitsa Severnaya, lit. North Street)

== See also ==
- List of inhabited localities in Chaunsky District
