= Kyttyk Peninsula =

Peninsula in Russia

- Location within Chukotka Autonomous Okrug

Geography
- Location: North Asia
- Coordinates: 69°32′53″N 167°43′34″E
- Adjacent to: East Siberian Sea

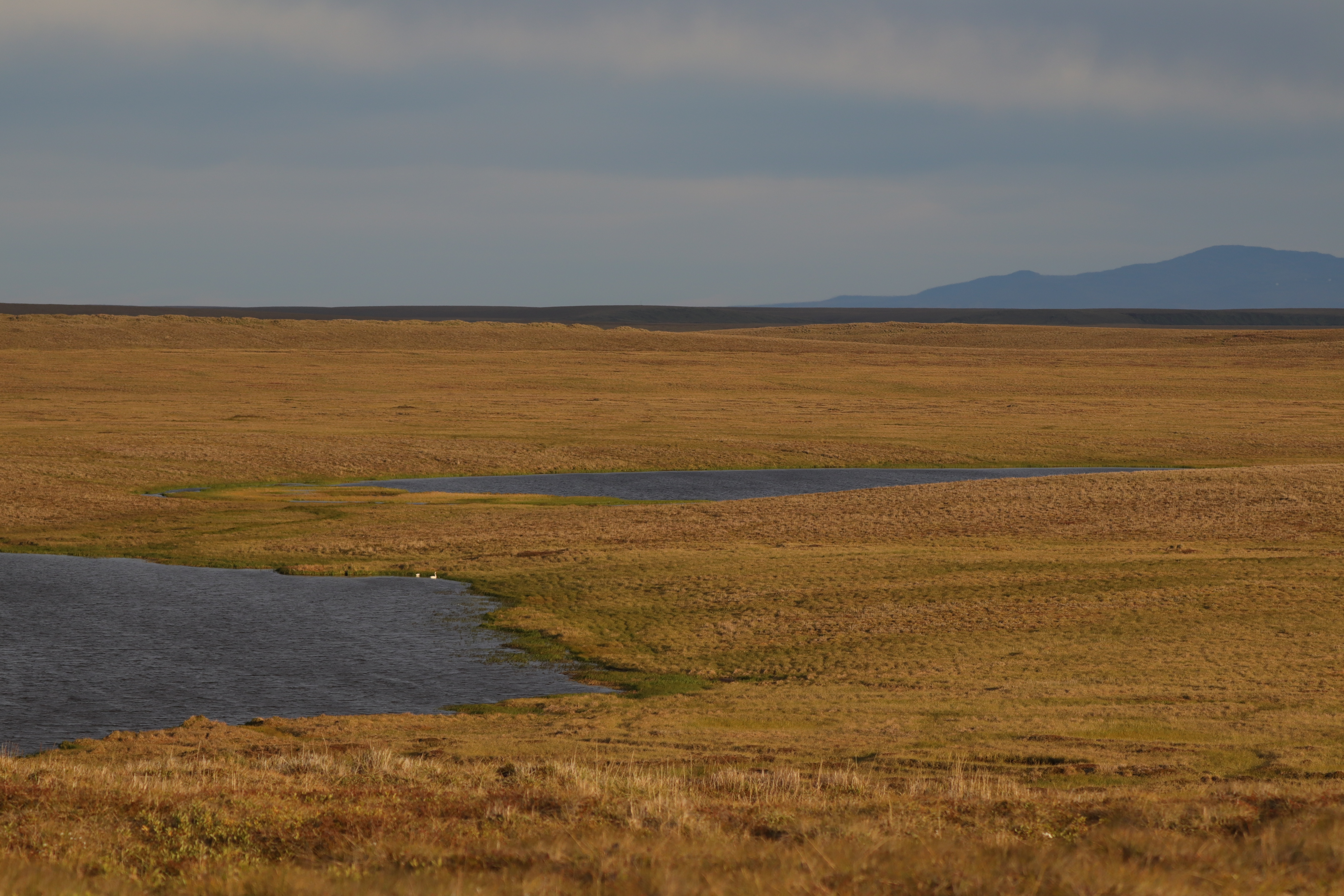

The Kyttyk Peninsula, commonly known as Kyttyk (Russian: Кыттык), is a peninsula on the northern coast of Chukotka Autonomous Okrug, washed by the East Siberian Sea.

The northernmost point of the peninsula is Cape Peschany. The territory of the peninsula consists of a swampy area. It is separated from the Ayon Island by the Maly Chaunsky Strait.

The average height of the surface is 5 meters. The highest parts range from 15 to 50 meters. In the north-eastern part of the peninsula, this height ends on the coast and forms a steep coast. The smooth part of the peninsula is covered with sand. The lakes in the western part have a circular shape, and their shores are sloping.

The climate is arctic. According to the Rauchua meteorological station, the average annual temperature is −10.6 ° С, the average temperature in January is −26 ° С, and in June it is + 7.6 ° С. The annual rainfall is 140 mm. North wind is constantly blowing on the shores. The snow melts in late May and settles in October.
