= Maly Chaunsky Strait =

- Location within Chukotka Autonomous Okrug
- Coordinates: 69°38′29″N 168°10′18″E
- Basin countries: Russia
- Average depth: 6 m (20 ft)

The Maly Chaunsky Strait (Russian: Малый Чаунский пролив) is a shallow strait connecting the Chaunskaya Bay and the East Siberian Sea. It separates Ayon Island from the mainland (Kyttyk Peninsula). It belongs to the jurisdiction of the Chaunsky District of the Chukotka Autonomous Okrug of Russia.

== Geography ==
The relatively large island of Mosey is located in the eastern part of the strait. The shores of the strait are low (in the southwestern part they are steep in places), with extensive silty drylands and sandy spits. The coastal part of the Ayon Peninsula abounds in many thermokarst brackish-water lakes and halophytic marches in the interlakes.

A huge number of bones of Middle Pleistocene animals were found in the steep banks of the strait.

== Historical background ==
The first Russian navigator to cross the strait was Nikita Shalaurov in 1761 on the way back of his expedition in search of a strait to the Pacific Ocean.

There is evidence that with distant southerly winds, when the strait became very shallow, the Chukchi crossed it on foot from the mainland to the Aion Island.

== Hydronym ==
Until the 19th century, the Maly Chaunsky Strait had the Russian name Travyanaya duct, which is associated with the erroneous assumption that later turned out to be that the bottom of the strait was overgrown with grass. The outdated Chukchi name is Ayoka-Pelintkir, the modern one is Ayopelgykytryn (“Aion's neck at the spit”).

== Flora and fauna ==
Brown algae grow in the northern part of the strait. The water area of the strait is inhabited by pink salmon and chum salmon, anadromous loach, and capelin.

The Maly Chaunsky Strait is the site of the Siberian eider.

== Minerals ==
There are cassiterite deposits at the bottom of the Maly Chaunsky Strait. In Soviet times, a project was proposed to block the strait with a dam followed by drainage in order to organize the extraction of tin.
