= Apapelgino =

Apapelgino Апапельгино Апапэԓьгын (Chukchi)
- Selo
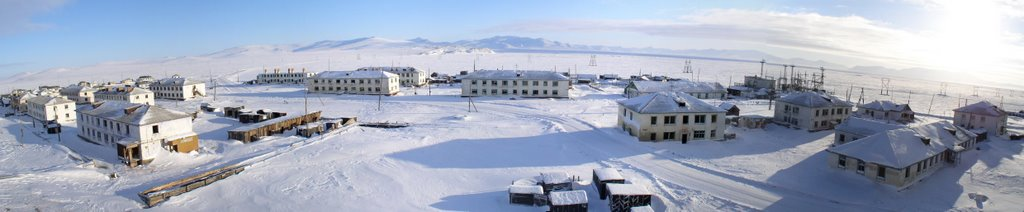
- Apapelgino in winter
- Interactive map of Apapelgino
- Location of Apapelgino Apapelgino (Chukotka Autonomous Okrug)
- Coordinates: 69°47′33″N 170°36′50″E
- Country: Russia
- Federal subject: Chukotka Autonomous Okrug
- Administrative district: Chaunsky District

Area
  - Total: 0.49 km^{2} (0.19 sq mi)

Population
  - Estimate (June 2005): 5 )

Municipal status
  - Municipal district: Chaunsky Municipal District
  - Urban settlement: Pevek Urban Settlement
- Time zone: UTC+12 (MSK+9)
- Postal code: 689410
- OKTMO ID: 77705000111

Apapelgino (Russian: Апа́пельгино; Chukchi: Апапэԓьгын, Apapèḷ'gyn) is a rural locality (a selo) in Chaunsky District of Chukotka Autonomous Okrug, Russia, located just to the east of Pevek, on the northeastern shores of Chaunskaya Bay. As of June 2005, its population was estimated to be five people.

Constructed as a part of the expansion of the Pevek Airport, Apapelgino has been mostly abandoned, although not officially abolished.

== Etymology ==
There are several versions of the origin of Apapelgino's name. The first theory is that it comes from the Chukchi word "апаапаԓгын" (apaapaḷgyn), meaning spider's neck, due to a variety of spiders in this place. Another theory is that it is a portmanteau of the Yupik word "апы" (apy), meaning snow, and the Chukchi word "вэлгын" (velgyn), meaning throat or mouth. Finally, the name could have derived from the Koryak word "апиапиль" (apiapil), meaning a sacrificial place.

== History ==
Apapelgino was used primarily to meet the administrative needs of the Pevek Airport, as well as for housing the airport's workers. In the 1950s, the airfield was developed as a part of the Soviet Air Forces' plan to create a ring of air bases around the Arctic for the use of its strategic bomber fleet during the Cold War. During the Cold War, this airfield formed a network of forward staging bases inside the Arctic Circle, the need for which was dictated by geography and weather. The northern parts of the Soviet Union closest to the United States are in the Arctic, with hostile weather conditions. Consequently, Soviet strategic bombers were normally stationed at bases in more temperate parts of the Soviet Union, flying training missions from these forward staging bases. However, the focus on intercontinental ballistic missiles as opposed to bombers meant that the airfield became less important and this was reflected by a gradual reduction in the local population.

Following the 1957 expansion of the airport, construction of a road linking Apapelgino to Pevek began in 1959; in 1961, a bridge was constructed over the Apapelgyn River to complete the link. As Apapelgino grew, a boiler house, greenhouses for growing vegetables, a complex for the lower secondary school, cafeteria and library, a nursery, kindergarten, and a series of apartment buildings were built.

By the beginning of the 21st century, however, the reduction in the population was such that it was decided that the remaining residents would be resettled to Pevek, with most residents leaving in 2001. Nevertheless, some refused to be resettled and, for the fear of losing the privileges allotted to the residents of localities in the process of liquidation, continued to reside in Apapelgino even after central heating was turned off. Most of those residents moved out in 2002.

Even after Apapelgino was mostly abandoned (with only five people remaining in residence as of 2005), the airport still serves as the main transport hub for Northern Chukotka and the local infrastructure is being maintained.

== Administrative and municipal status ==
Within the framework of administrative divisions, Apapelgino is subordinated to Chaunsky District. Within the framework of municipal divisions, Apapelgino is a part of Pevek Urban Settlement within Chaunsky Municipal District.

== Transportation ==
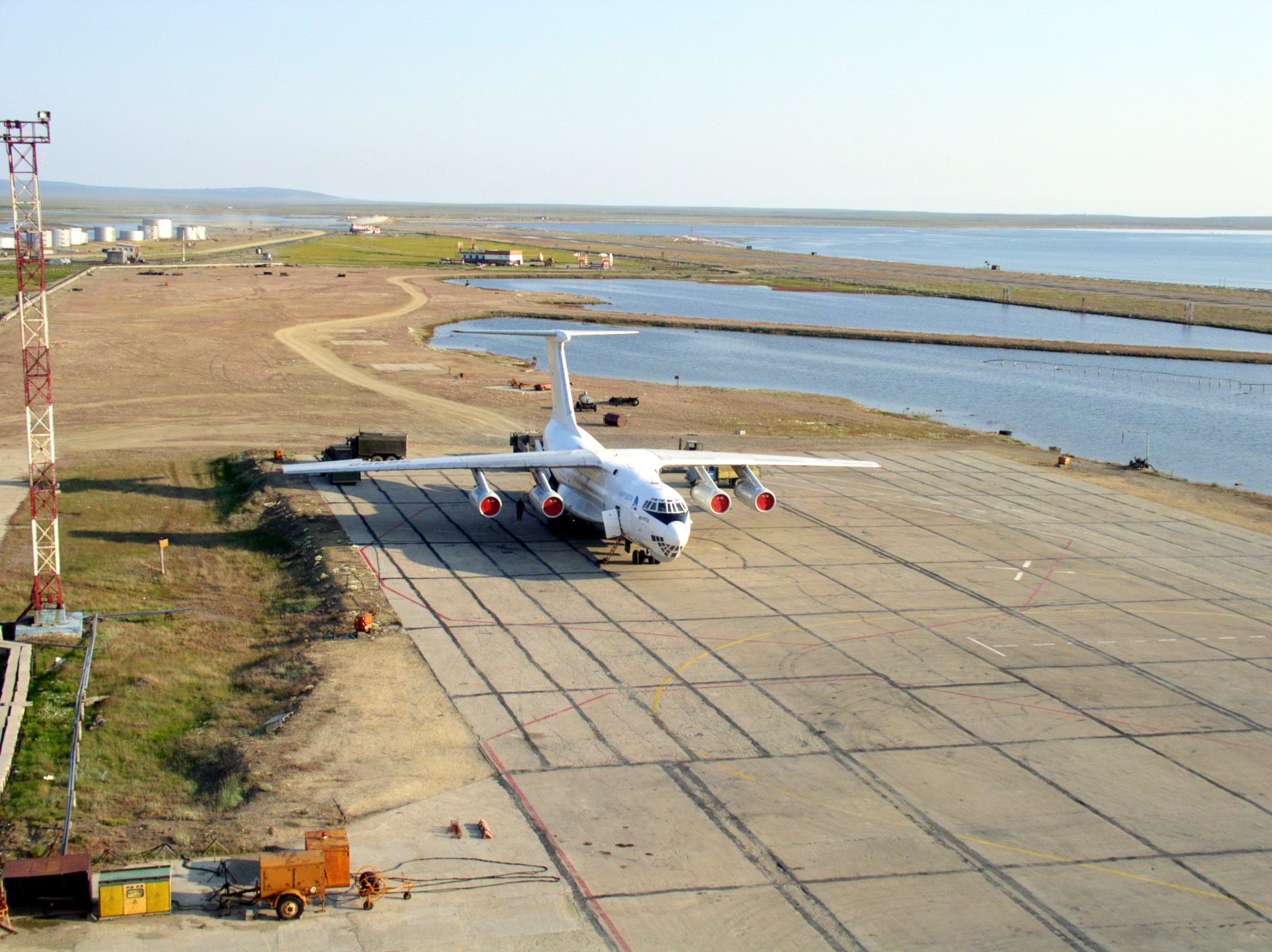
View south of the Pevek Airport. Ilyushin Il-76 parked.

Apapelgino is served by the Pevek Airport. The only road connecting Apapelgino with outside world leads to Pevek.

== Climate ==
Apapelgino has a Tundra climate (ET) according to the Köppen climate classification.

Climate data for Apapelgino
Month	Jan	Feb	Mar	Apr	May	Jun	Jul	Aug	Sep	Oct	Nov	Dec	Year
Record high °C (°F)	0 (32)	4 (39)	−1 (30)	1 (34)	14 (57)	25 (77)	23 (73)	23 (73)	14 (57)	10 (50)	3 (37)	−2 (28)	25 (77)
Mean daily maximum °C (°F)	−20.7 (−5.3)	−20.2 (−4.4)	−19.1 (−2.4)	−14.2 (6.4)	−0.1 (31.8)	7.9 (46.2)	9.2 (48.6)	8.2 (46.8)	2.3 (36.1)	−8 (18)	−21.1 (−6.0)	−20.5 (−4.9)	−8 (18)
Mean daily minimum °C (°F)	−26.8 (−16.2)	−29.4 (−20.9)	−27 (−17)	−19.8 (−3.6)	−5.4 (22.3)	2.4 (36.3)	4 (39)	3.3 (37.9)	−1.1 (30.0)	−11.7 (10.9)	−24.2 (−11.6)	−23.6 (−10.5)	−13.3 (8.1)
Record low °C (°F)	−49 (−56)	−51 (−60)	−49 (−56)	−35 (−31)	−27 (−17)	−34 (−29)	−1 (30)	−4 (25)	−18 (0)	−34 (−29)	−41 (−42)	−46 (−51)	−51 (−60)
Average rainfall mm (inches)	15 (0.6)	9 (0.4)	18 (0.7)	6 (0.2)	6 (0.2)	27 (1.1)	42 (1.7)	30 (1.2)	21 (0.8)	36 (1.4)	30 (1.2)	12 (0.5)	252 (9.9)
Average snowy days	16	12	10	10	7	2	2	3	10	16	16	16	120

== Gallery ==
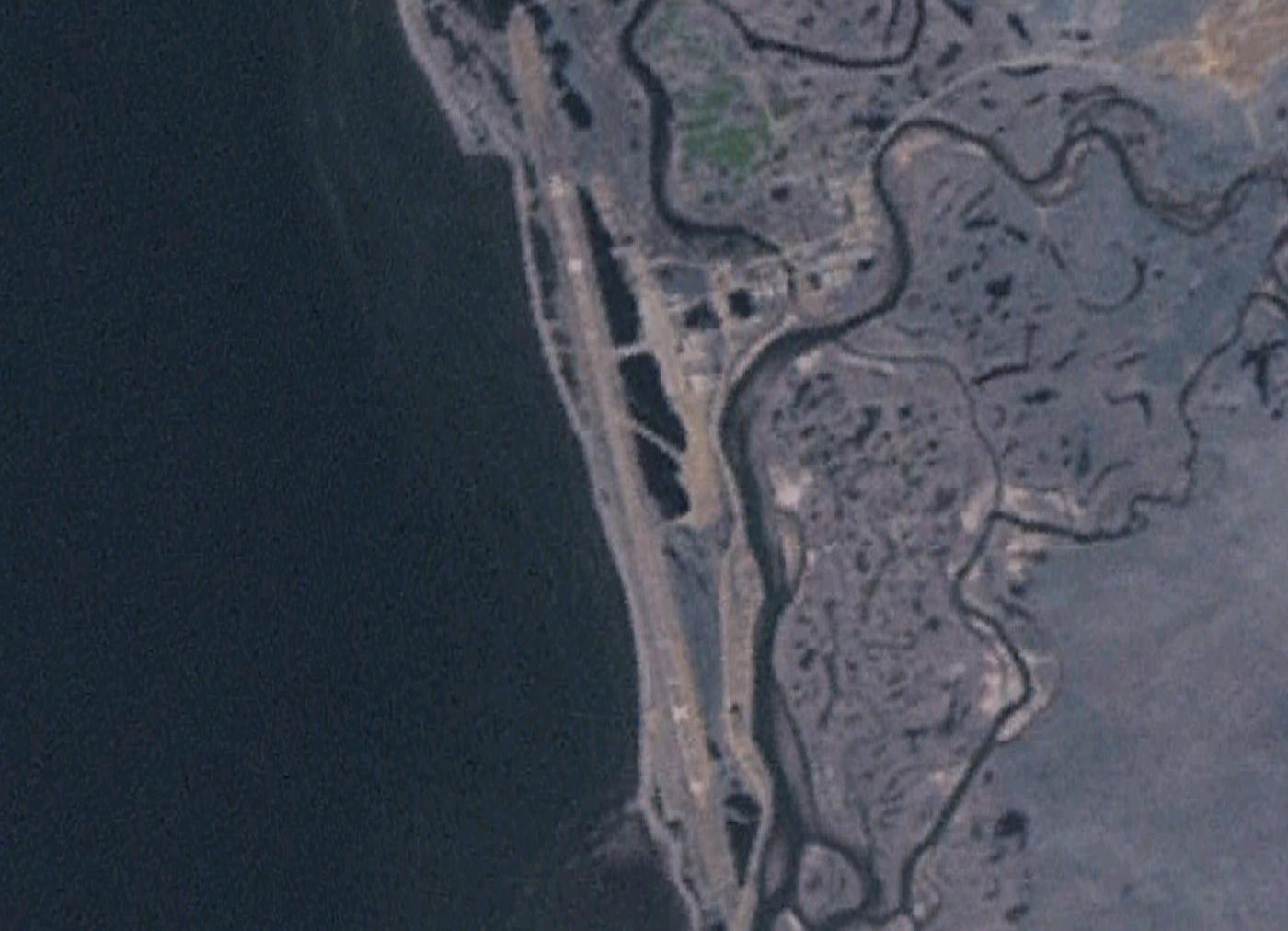
Satellite photograph of Apapelgino and the Pevek Airport

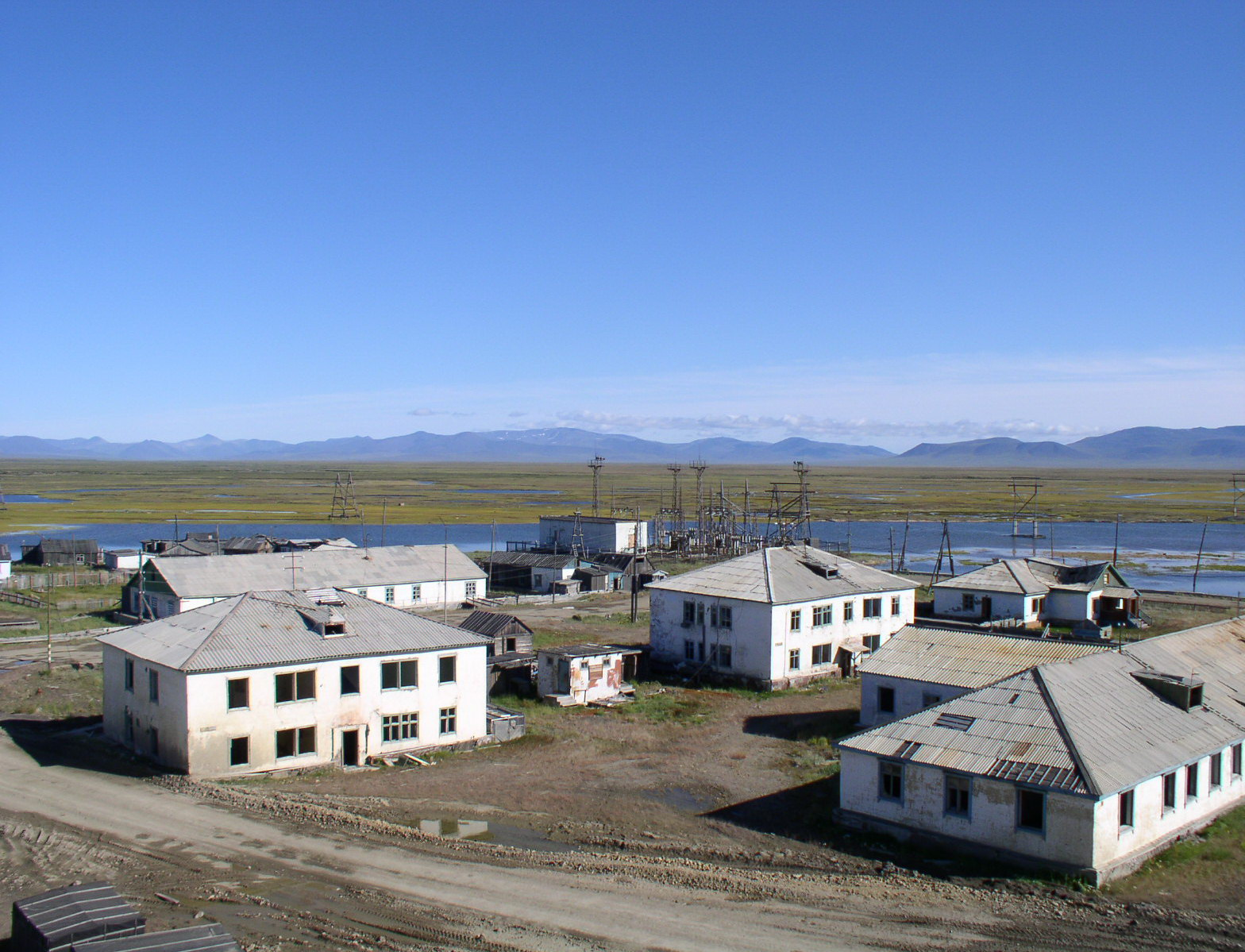
Zaozyornaya Street

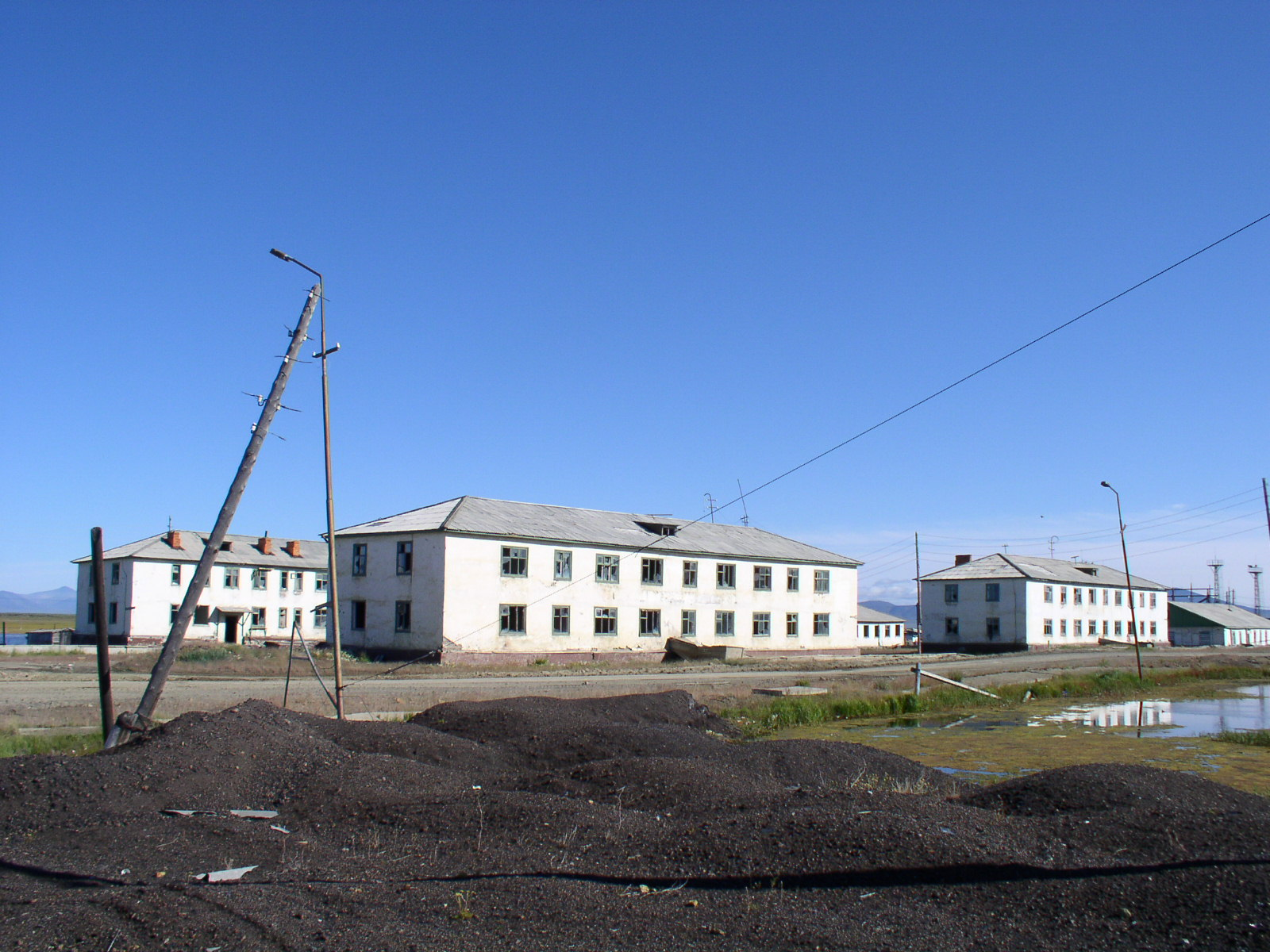
Sportivnaya Street

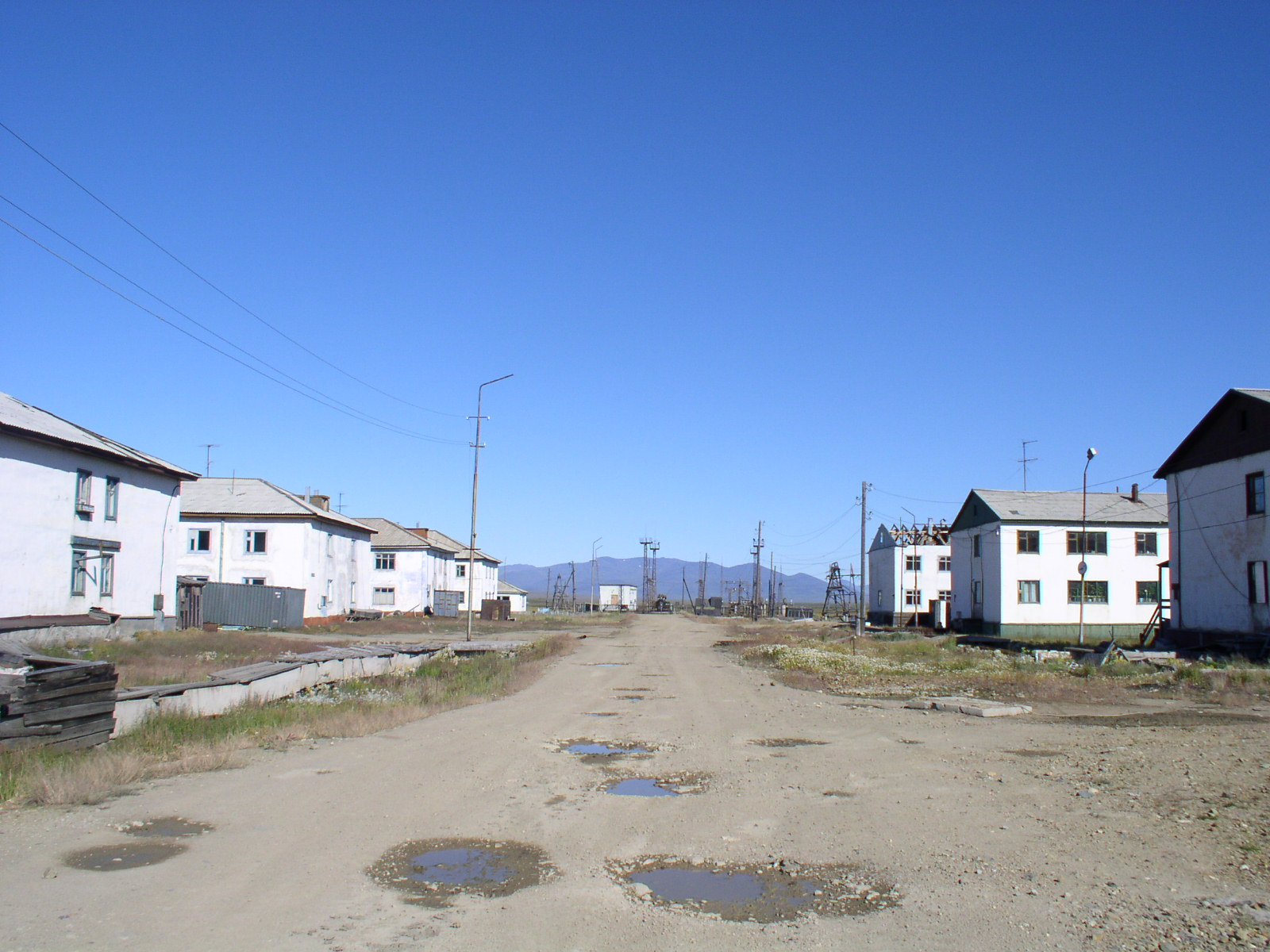
Chkalova Street

== See also ==
- List of inhabited localities in Chaunsky District
