= Yanranay =

Yanranay Янранай Янраӈай (Chukchi)
- Selo
- Interactive map of Yanranay
- Location of Yanranay Yanranay (Chukotka Autonomous Okrug)
- Coordinates: 69°45′N 171°20′E
- Country: Russia
- Federal subject: Chukotka Autonomous Okrug
- Administrative district: Chaunsky District
- Founded: 1954 or 1960

Area
  - Total: 0.3 km^{2} (0.12 sq mi)

Population (2010 Census)
  - Total: 217
  - Estimate (January 2016): 153 (−29.5%)
  - Density: 720/km^{2} (1,900/sq mi)

Municipal status
  - Municipal district: Chaunsky Municipal District
  - Urban settlement: Pevek Rural Settlement
- Time zone: UTC+12 (MSK+9)
- Postal code: 689430
- OKTMO ID: 77705000126

Yanranay (Russian: Янранай; Chukot: Янраӈай, Janraňaj) is a rural locality (a selo) in Chaunsky District of Chukotka Autonomous Okrug, Russia, located just to the west of Pevek. Population: 217 (2010 census); Municipally, Yanranay is subordinated to Chaunsky Municipal District and is incorporated as Yanranay Rural Settlement.

== History ==
Yanranay was founded in 1954 or 1960 when several formerly nomadic enterprises were grouped together to form kolkhozes (collective farms). The Chukchi who live here originally came from Cape Shelag, to the north. Modern Yanranay is a typical ethnic Chukotkan village, consisting of one- or two-story houses, with basic facilities including a school, stores, a library, and a House of Culture. The name for the village translates from the Chukchi as "Solitary Mountain" as the settlement is at the foot of a mountain of the same name.

=== Change in municipal status ===
Prior to October 2010, Yanranay served as the administrative center of Yanranay Rural Settlement—a municipal division of Chaunsky Municipal District. On October 20, 2010, Yanranay Rural Settlement was abolished with its territory merged into Pevek Urban Settlement. As an inhabited locality, however, the status of Yanranay remains unchanged.

== Demographics ==
The population according to the 2010 census was 217, of whom 113 were male and 104 female. According to the official Chaunsky District website was estimated at 209, down slightly from 226 in 2005 according to an environmental impact report produced for the Kupol Gold Project, which itself was down slightly on a 2003 estimate of 240, most of whom are of Chukchi descent.

== Transportation ==
Yanranay is only connected by a 35-kilometer (22 mi) dirt road to Pevek, with a journey time of 40–50 minutes.

== Climate ==
Yanranay has a Tundra climate (ET) because the warmest month has an average temperature between 0 °C (32 °F) and +10 °C (50 °F).

Climate data for Yanranay
Month	Jan	Feb	Mar	Apr	May	Jun	Jul	Aug	Sep	Oct	Nov	Dec	Year
Record high °C (°F)	4.7 (40.5)	5.5 (41.9)	3.9 (39.0)	6.4 (43.5)	10.5 (50.9)	18.4 (65.1)	22.7 (72.9)	22 (72)	16.3 (61.3)	12 (54)	8.7 (47.7)	10 (50)	22.7 (72.9)
Mean daily maximum °C (°F)	−17.9 (−0.2)	−16.7 (1.9)	−15.8 (3.6)	−9.1 (15.6)	−0.7 (30.7)	5.6 (42.1)	10 (50)	9.2 (48.6)	5.4 (41.7)	0.5 (32.9)	−4.7 (23.5)	−13.9 (7.0)	−4 (25)
Mean daily minimum °C (°F)	−23.9 (−11.0)	−22.8 (−9.0)	−22.3 (−8.1)	−15.2 (4.6)	−4.6 (23.7)	1 (34)	4.8 (40.6)	4.8 (40.6)	2.2 (36.0)	−3 (27)	−9.8 (14.4)	−19 (−2)	−9.4 (15.1)
Record low °C (°F)	−44.1 (−47.4)	−41.5 (−42.7)	−41.4 (−42.5)	−31.1 (−24.0)	−24.5 (−12.1)	−5.6 (21.9)	−4.7 (23.5)	−2.7 (27.1)	−6.1 (21.0)	−19.9 (−3.8)	−33.6 (−28.5)	−41.2 (−42.2)	−44.1 (−47.4)
Average rainfall mm (inches)	19 (0.7)	20 (0.8)	13.8 (0.54)	18.1 (0.71)	18.8 (0.74)	15.1 (0.59)	40.4 (1.59)	46.2 (1.82)	35.9 (1.41)	45.4 (1.79)	28.8 (1.13)	18.4 (0.72)	319.9 (12.59)
Average snowy days	14	12	11	15	13	3	0	0	4	17	20	15	124

== See also ==
- List of inhabited localities in Chaunsky District
