= Bystry, Chukotka Autonomous Okrug =

Bystry Быстрый
- Work settlement (abolished)
- Interactive map of Bystry
- Location of Bystry Bystry (Chukotka Autonomous Okrug)
- Coordinates: 69°10′22″N 172°22′02″E
- Country: Russia
- Federal subject: Chukotka Autonomous Okrug
- Administrative district: Chaunsky District
- Abolished: 1998

Population
  - Estimate (2015): 0 )
- Time zone: UTC+12 (MSK+9)
- Postal code: 689400
- OKTMO ID: 77705000058

Bystry (Russian: Бы́стрый, lit. quick) was an urban locality (a work settlement) in Chaunsky District of Chukotka Autonomous Okrug, Russia, located northwest of Komsomolsky. The settlement was abandoned as a result of the extraction of gold no longer being economically viable and as of 2008 was in the process of being officially liquidated.

== History ==
The mines were declared unprofitable and that there was no possibility of developing any other form of economy in 1999 and the settlement was closed along with a number of others in Chukotka. The Russian government guaranteed funds to transport non-working pensioners and the unemployed in liquidated settlements including Bystry from Chukotka to other parts of Russia. The Ministry of railways was obliged to lease containers for the transportation of the migrants' goods to the Chukotkan administration and ensure that they were delivered to the various settlements.

== Transport ==
Bystry is connected to Pevek, Komsomolsky, Krasnoarmeysky by a road network, one of the more developed in Chukotka, but it is not connected to any other part of the district or Chukotka by permanent road. There is however, a network of roads within the settlement including:

- Улица Горная (Ulitsa Gornaya, lit. Mountain Street)
- Улица Ивановская (Ulitsa Ivanovskaya)
- Улица Комсомольская (Ulitsa Komsomolskaya, lit. Komsomol Street)
- Первый Микрорайон (Pervy Mikroraion, lit. First Microdistrict)
- Улица Советская (Ulitsa Sovetskaya, lit. Soviet Street)
- Улица Строительная (Ulitsa Stroitelnaya, lit. Construction Street)
- Улица Циолковского (Ulitsa Tsiolkovskogo)
- Улица Шахтерская (Ulitsa Shakhtyorskaya, lit. Miners Street)
- Улица Школьная (Ulitsa Shkolnaya, lit. School Street)

== See also ==
- List of inhabited localities in Chaunsky District
