= Ayon (surname) =

Ayon is a surname. Notable people with the surname include:

- Ana Duran Ayon (born 1997), Mexican weightlifter
- Andrés Ayón (1936–2021), Cuban baseball player
- Belkis Ayón (1967–1999), Cuban printmaker
- Gustavo Ayón (born 1985), Mexican basketball player

== See also ==
- Ayton (surname)
- Ryon
