= Chaunsky District =

Chaunsky District Чаунский район (Russian)
- District
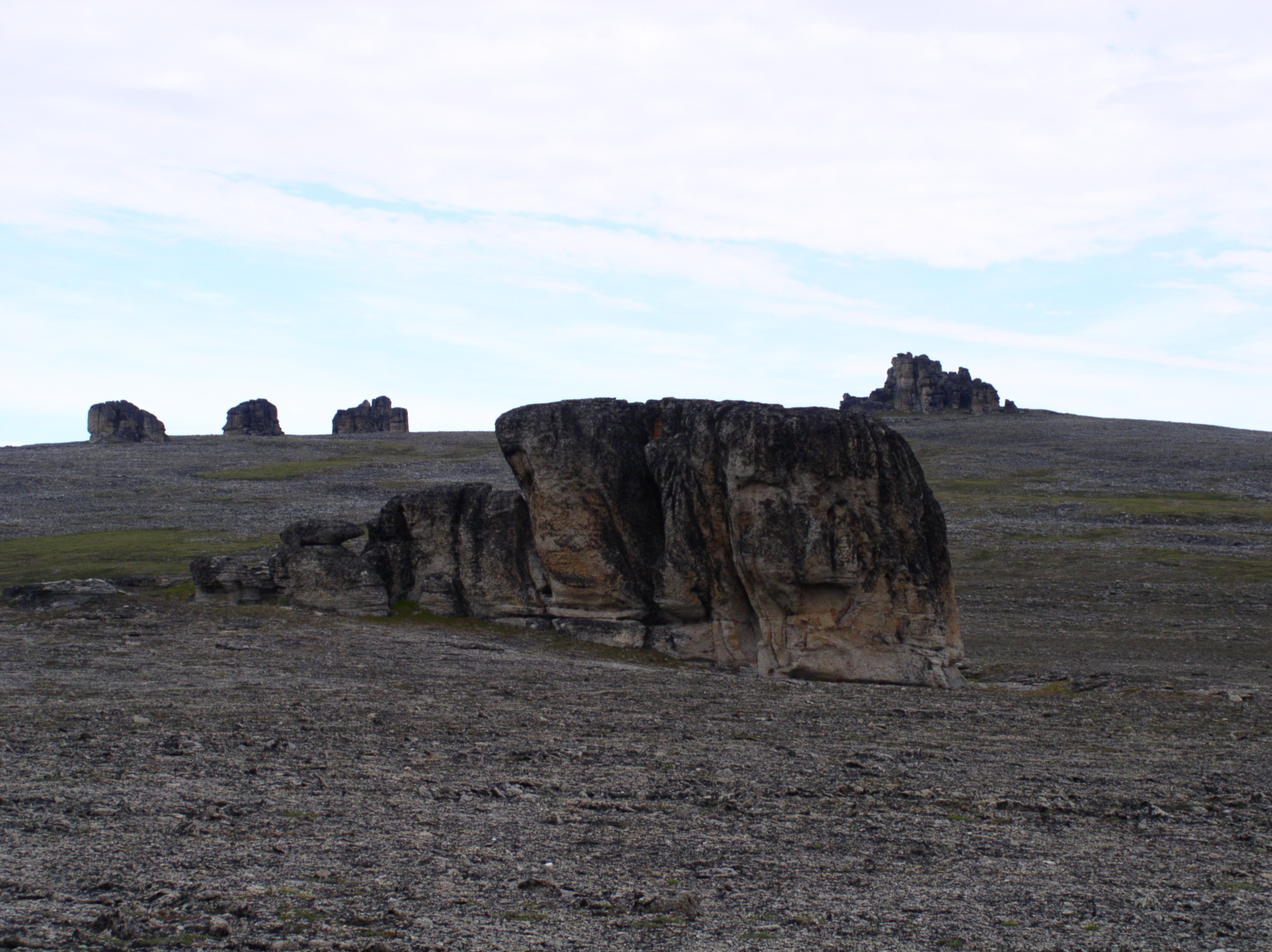
- Stacks in Chaunsky District, a natural monument

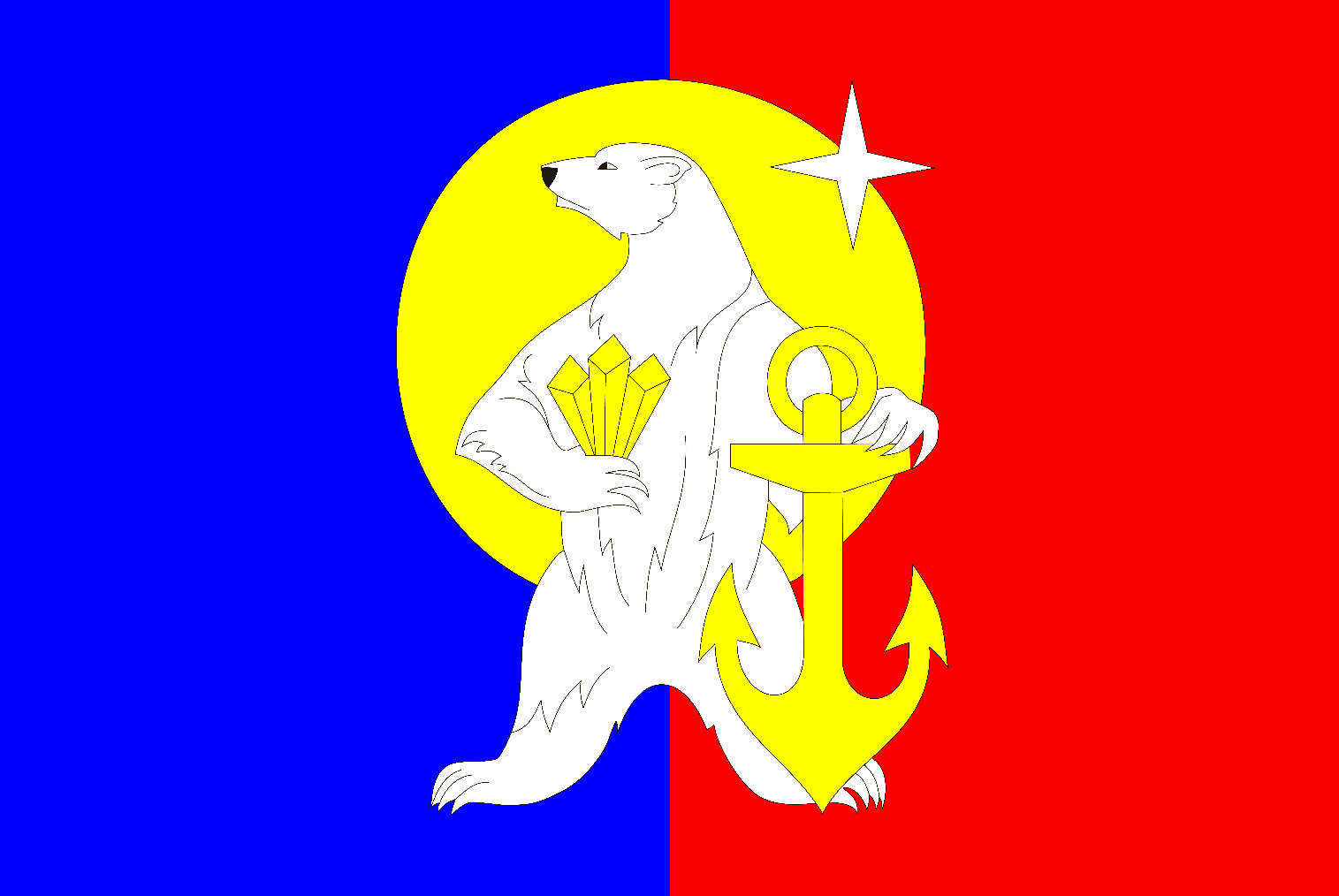
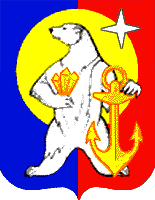
- Flag Coat of arms
- Location of Chaunsky District in Chukotka Autonomous Okrug
- Coordinates: 68°52′06″N 170°36′29″E
- Country: Russia
- Federal subject: Chukotka Autonomous Okrug
- Established: 1933 MISCELLANEA----
- Administrative center: Pevek

Government
  - Type: Local government
  - Body: ----STATISTICS----
  - Head of the Administration: Yelena Kompaniyets

Area
  - Total: 67,091 km^{2} (25,904 sq mi)

Population (2010 Census)
  - Total: 5,148
  - Estimate (January 2016): 5,747
  - Density: 0.07673/km^{2} (0.1987/sq mi)
  - Urban: 80.8%
  - Rural: 19.2%

Administrative structure
  - Inhabited localities: 1 cities/towns, 6 urban-type settlements, 4 rural localities

Municipal structure
  - Municipally incorporated as: Chaunsky Municipal District
  - Municipal divisions: 1 urban settlements, 3 rural settlements
- Time zone: UTC+12 (MSK+9)
- OKTMO ID: 77705000
- Holiday: ----ADMINISTRATIVE STATUS----
- Website: http://go-pevek.ru/index.php

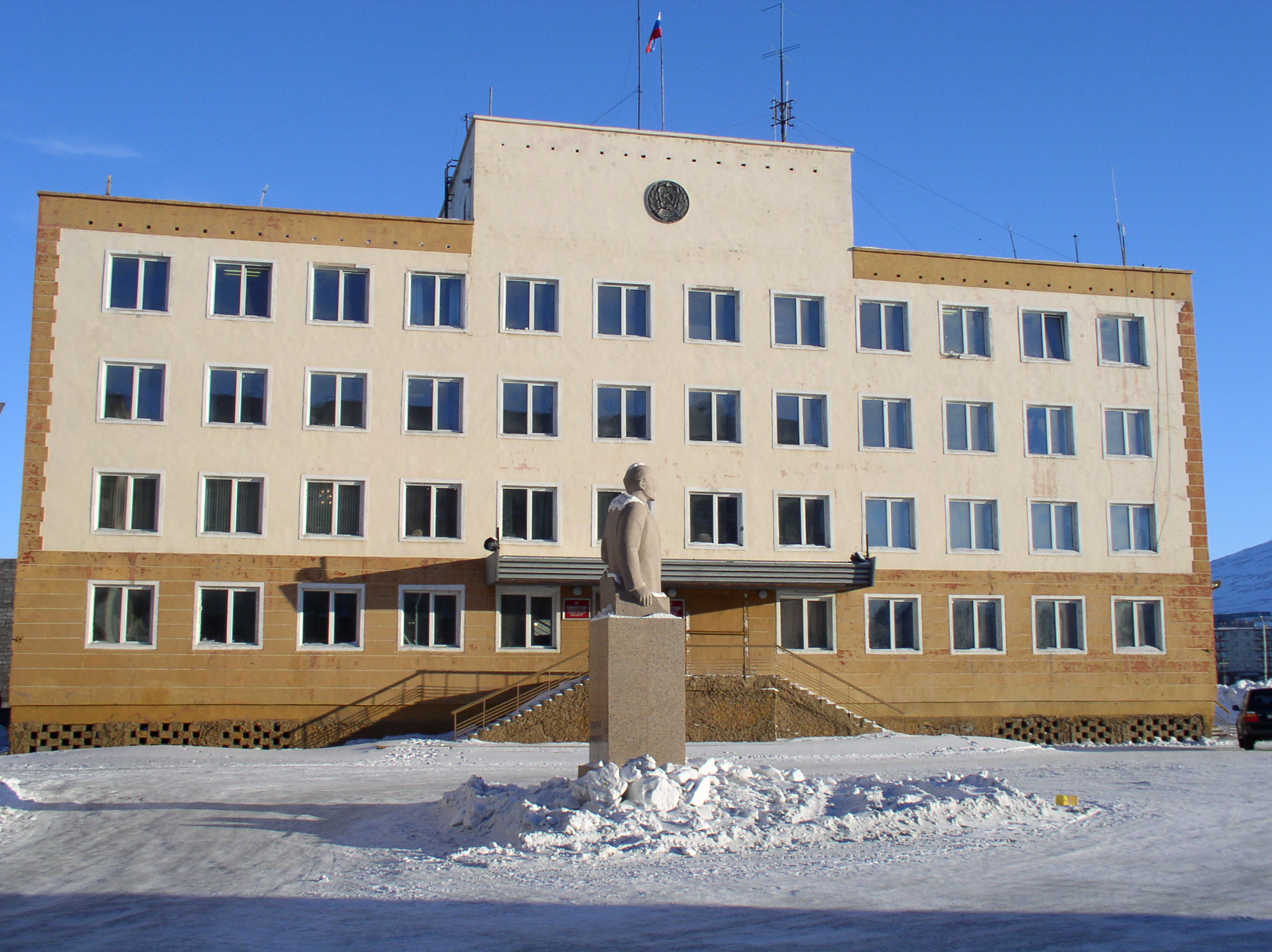
District administration building

Chaunsky District (Russian: Ча́унский райо́н; Chukchi: Чаан район, Čaan rajon) is an administrative and municipal district (raion), one of the six in Chukotka Autonomous Okrug, Russia. It is on the northern shore of the autonomous okrug and borders Iultinsky District to the northeast, Anadyrsky District to the southeast, and Bilibinsky District to the south and west. The area of the district is 67,091 square kilometers (25,904 sq mi). Its administrative center is the town of Pevek. Population: 5,148 (2010 census); 6,962 (2002 census); 32,167 (1989 Soviet census). The population of Pevek accounts for 80.8% of the district's total population.

The land within the current boundaries was first visited by non-indigenous people in the 18th century. The indigenous people in the district are mainly Chukchi, and form about 15% of the population.

== Geography ==
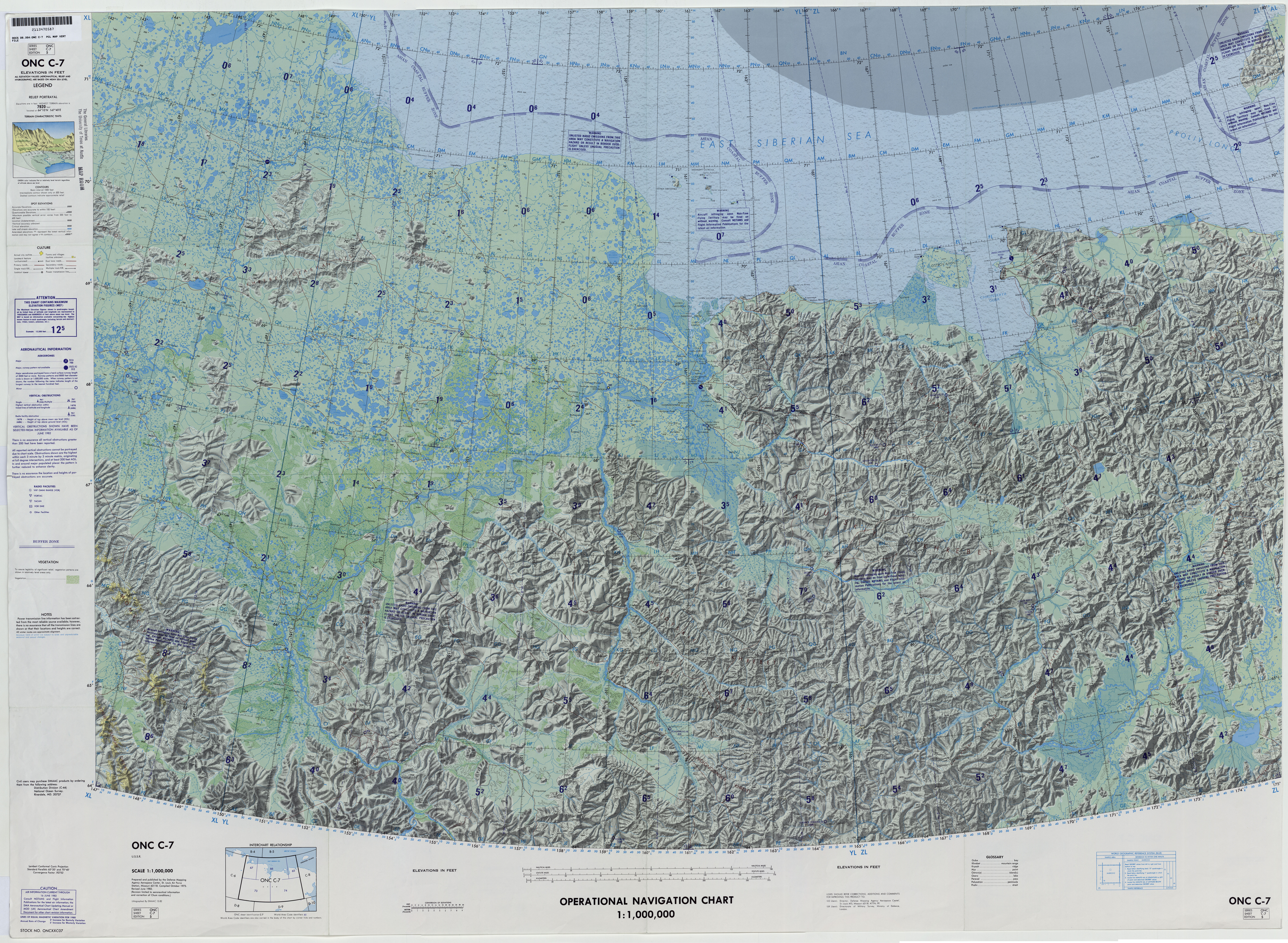
Map including Chaunsky Bay

The district is centered around the Chaunskaya Bay, on the shores of which Pevek, the administrative center of the district, is situated. The district's territory also includes Ayon Island, found at the entrance to the Chaunskaya Bay. There is an eponymous settlement on the island.

The district's territory stretches for 330 kilometers (210 mi) from north to south and for 290 kilometers (180 mi) from east to west. Cape Shelagsky is its northernmost point. Chaunsky District is significantly flatter than Bilibinsky District located to the west and contains large areas devoted to reindeer pasture.

Approximately 350 kilometers (220 mi) long, the Chaun River, which flows into Chaunskaya Bay, is the longest river in the whole autonomous okrug.

There are a number of wetland areas of significance within the district. The most westerly of these is situated on the Kyttyk Peninsula and the mouth of the Rauchua River. This area is dominated by the Lower Rauchua delta and the alluvial plains of the Kyttyk Peninsula, from which Ayon Island is separated by the Maly Chaunsky Strait. The peninsula is almost completely covered in a complex system of lakes, ranging in size from small saline pools lying on a recently exposed marine terrace 1 to 2 m above sea level, near the coast, to lakes up to 1 km wide and 12 m deep on high level surfaces 10–15 m above sea level. In addition, the peninsula is scored by a number of rivers, the Eyukuul, Koz'mina, Rakvezan and Emykkyvian among the most significant.

The Ust-Chaun area of the district also contains significant wetlands at the south end of Chaunskaya Bay, consisting mainly of an alluvial plain approximately 100 km wide and 60 km north to south. The wetlands at Ust-Chaun are similar in structure to those at the Rauchua / Kyttyk wetland, consisting of a landscape almost entirely filled with small lakes, those nearest Chaunskaya Bay are the smallest and shallowest (less than 70 cm deep) and those on more elevated ground being deeper at 1.5–3 m deep The Ust-Chaun region serves a fishing centre for the inhabitants of Rytkuchi, although this has lost its importance in recent years as stocks of Char have diminished, as a result of overfishing both for sale to the local Sovkhoz and as bait for trapping foxes.

=== Flora ===
There are approximately 200 different species of plant within the Rauchua / Kyttyk wetland area comprising a variety of steppe, boreal and arctic species, a number of which occur at the eastern limit of their natural habitat. In the Ust-Chaun area, there are even more recorded plant species, at 252., including a number of rare species.

=== Fauna ===
Humpback and chum salmon enter the lower reaches of the Rauchua. Several species of whitefish, grayling and smelt also live in the river or in the many surrounding lakes. Sticklebacks also live in the lakes along with Arctic char, although the community of char is infested with Acanthocephala. Similar fish exist in the Ust-Chaun region, and in addition to fish, the wetland is also home to the Siberian newt, which lives in the shrub-covered tundra near the delta.

The Rauchua / Kyttyk wetland area is considered to be the easternmost extent of so-called "Kolyma fauna", such as the Terek sandpiper, brown shrike and scarlet rosefinch. The most common bird species in the Rauchua / Kyttyk wetland are the yellow-billed, black-throated and Pacific divers. One of the main reasons for the importance of the Rauchua / Kyttyk is the breeding population (figures as of 1994) of Bewick's swan (approximately 300 birds), the Pacific eider (approximately 3,000 birds) and the spectacled eider (approximately 2,000 birds). Spectacled and Pacific eider as well as black-throated and Pacific divers are also found in the Ust-Chaun region, though the Pacific eider is much more common on the Kyttyl Peninsula and near Apapelgino.

Birds of prey are found in the Ust-Chaun area, with the rough-legged buzzard nesting in the area and species such as the goshawk and peregrine falcon visiting the area regularly. Their prey consists of a wide variety of small mammals and almost all mammals found in the tundra regions of the Russian Far East are found in the Ust-Chaun area, including a number of species of shrew, vole and lemming. Larger mammals include wild reindeer, wolves and brown bear.

== Demographics ==
Approximately 85% of the district's population in 2003 were non-indigenous peoples. As with most of the districts in Chukotka, indigenous peoples are more often found in the scattered rural localities, while ethnic Russians are more often found in the urban areas. These people either migrated to the Far East, or are the descendants of those who did, enticed by the higher pay, large pensions, and more generous allowances permitted to those prepared to endure the cold and the isolation, or, more likely, were exiled here as a result of one of Stalin's purges, or were exiled here having been released from the Gulag. The existence of the port of Pevek in the district is a major reason for the presence of ethnic Russians.

The indigenous people present in the district are almost exclusively Chukchi. An environmental impact study produced by Bema Gold for the Kupol gold project states that at the start of 2004, 846 of the districts inhabitants were of indigenous origin. Of these people, 841 were Chukchi, with 2 reported as Yupik, 2 Mansi and 1 Even comprising the remaining five indigenous individuals. The indigenous people of Chaunsky District reside mainly in Rytkuchi, Ayon and Yanranay.

== History ==
=== 18th and 19th centuries ===
The area of what is now Chaunsky District was first visited by non-indigenous people, when Karl Merk came across the Chaun River, as part of the overland element of the Billings Expedition—the expedition ordered by Catherine the Great and led by Englishman Joseph Billings in an attempt to find a true Northeast Passage. Prior to the river's discovery by Merk, the Chaun River represented the westernmost boundary of the Chukchi land. Merk named the river Chavaveyam after Mount Chaun, from where the river springs.

The Rauchua River was a place inhabited by mammoths in prehistoric times and was also the scene of a bloody battle between Chukchi herders and a combination of Yukaghirs and Evens during the 19th century. The name Rauchua comes from the Chukchi word "Ravchyvan", meaning place of a victory over a camp.

=== 20th century ===
The district in its present form was founded in 1933. Gold and tin were discovered in the 1940s, which led to the first occurrences of industrial mining in the district in the 1950s. The effect of this growth in industry was that Chaunsky District became the first district in the region to have a road network constructed as well as an electricity grid. During World War II, the Chaunskaya Bay area of Chaunsky District was the most important tin producing area in the whole of the Soviet Union.

== Economy ==
=== Industrial and administrative ===
Many of the populated places throughout Chukotka owe their existence to tin and gold mines, and deposits of these metals were first discovered in Chukotka in Chaunsky District in 1941. In 2002, the average monthly salary was just over 11,000 rubles per month, although agricultural wages were on average only around half that per month. Mining and ancillary services still form the major elements of the economy of Chaunsky District. There are two large mines and a number of small mines in the district, supported by a large trucking company.

=== Traditional and cultural ===
Compared to other districts in Chukotka, agricultural enterprise is not particularly well developed. There is only one farming brigade, Chaunskoye, employing just under 200 people. The brigade herds around 15,000 reindeer and is also involved in fishing.

=== Transportation ===
As a result of the development of the mining industry, Chaunsky District also has the most developed road transport network in Chukotka, with paved, unpaved, or snow roads leading from Pevek to all major population hubs. Pevek Airport, located about 14 kilometers (8.7 mi) from Pevek proper, provides a link for the region to Moscow. Pevek's port is the largest in Chukotka and is generally open for about two and a half months a year from mid-July to September.

The transport infrastructure of the district is more developed compared to the rest of Chukotka; this in part is helped by the presence of Pevek. Pevek itself has the second largest airport in Chukotka after the Ugolny Airport and offers one of the few means of direct air travel to Moscow. Pevek is also the naval headquarters of the East Arctic during the short summer.

== Administrative and municipal status ==
Within the framework of administrative divisions, Chaunsky District is one of the six in the autonomous okrug. The town of Pevek serves as its administrative center. The district does not have any lower-level administrative divisions and has administrative jurisdiction over one town, six urban-type settlements, and four rural localities, consisting of all the inhabited localities listed below in the "Inhabited localities" section, except for Billings, which is administratively subordinated to Iultinsky District.

As a municipal division, the district is incorporated as Chaunsky Municipal District and is divided into one urban settlement and three rural settlements.

=== Inhabited localities ===
Municipal composition
Urban settlements	Population	Male	Female	Inhabited localities in jurisdiction
Pevek (Певек)	4379	2344 (53.5%)	2035 (46.5%)	town of Pevek (administrative center of the district); selo of Apapelgino; selo of Yanranay
Rural settlements	Population	Male	Female	Rural localities in jurisdiction*
Ayon (Айон)	252	120 (47.6%)	132 (52.4%)	**selo of Ayon**
Billings (Биллингс)	211	109 (51.7%)	102 (48.3%)	**selo of Billings**
Rytkuchi (Рыткучи)	517	284 (54.9%)	233 (45.1%)	**selo of Rytkuchi**
Inhabited localities being liquidated
urban-type settlement of Baranikha; urban-type settlement of Bystry; urban-type settlement of Komsomolsky; urban-type settlement of Krasnoarmeysky; urban-type settlement of Valkumey; urban-type settlement of Yuzhny

Divisional source:
Population source:
*Administrative centers are shown in bold
