= Kolyma Gulf =

Gulf of the East Siberian Sea

- Колымский залив (Russian); Xalıma xomoto (Yakut)
- Map showing the location of the gulf in the Sakha Republic

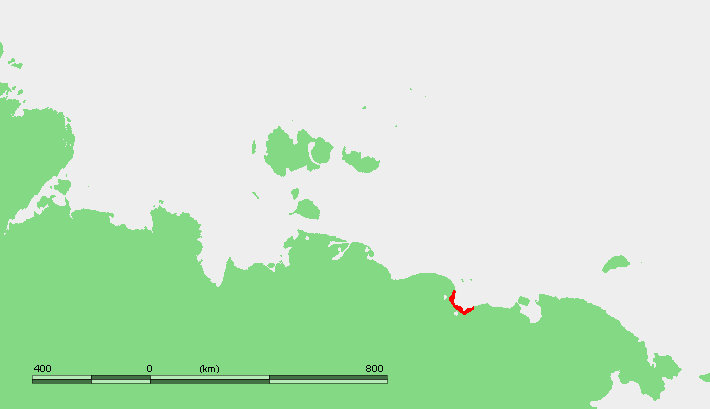
- Location: Far North
- Coordinates: 70°N 162°E
- River sources: Kolyma River, Rauchua River, Chukochya River
- Ocean/sea sources: East Siberian Sea
- Basin countries: Russia
- Max. width: 300 km (190 mi)

The Kolyma Gulf (Yakut: Халыма хомото, Xalıma xomoto; Russian: Колымский залив, Kolymskiy Zaliv) is the largest gulf of the East Siberian Sea.

== Geography ==
The gulf is more than 300 km wide. Its limits are the NE projection of the Kolyma Lowlands close to the Medvyezhi Islands in the west and the Nutel'gyrgym Peninsula and Ayon Island in the east.

The Kolyma River flows into the sea in the western side of the Kolyma Gulf, forming a huge river delta full of islands. The bay's coastline is lowland dotted with numerous lakes and swamps. The sea in this bay is frozen for over nine months every year and is often clogged with ice floes. Other rivers flowing into the Kolyma Gulf are the Rauchua and the Chukochya River.

Administratively the western section of the Kolyma Gulf belongs to the Sakha Republic (Yakutia), while its eastern section belongs to the Chukotka Autonomous Okrug of the Russian Federation.
