= Pyrkakay mine =

Tin mine in Shelag Range, Chukotka Autonomous Okrug, Russia

- Location in Chukotka Autonomous Okrug
- Location: Shelag Range, Chukotka Autonomous Okrug, Russia; 69°31′N 171°59′E
- Products: tin
- Closed: 1998
- Company: Pyrkakayskiye Shtokverki (пыркакайские штокверки)

The Pyrkakay mine was a large open pit mine located in the Shelag Range, Chukotka Mountains, Chukotka Autonomous Okrug, North-eastern Russia.

Pyrkakay represented one of the largest tin reserves in Russia having estimated reserves of 228.5 million tonnes of ore grading 0.23% tin.

The Krasnoarmeysky settlement, built to house the miners, was determined to no longer be economically viable in 1998 and is now a ghost town.

== See also ==
- List of mines in Russia
