= Baranikha, Syamzhensky District, Vologda Oblast =

Baranikha Бараниха
- Village
- Location within Vologda Oblast Location within Russia
- Coordinates: 60°14′N 41°40′E
- Country: Russia
- Region: Vologda Oblast
- District: Syamzhensky District
- Time zone: UTC+3:00

Baranikha (Russian: Бараниха) is a rural locality (a village) in Dvinitskoye Rural Settlement, Syamzhensky District, Vologda Oblast, Russia. The population was 37 as of 2002.

== Geography ==
Baranikha is located 55 km northeast of Syamzha (the district's administrative centre) by road. Kolbinskaya is the nearest rural locality.
