= Yuzhny, Chukotka Autonomous Okrug =

Yuzhny Южный
- Urban-type settlement (abolished)
- Interactive map of Yuzhny
- Location of Yuzhny Yuzhny (Chukotka Autonomous Okrug)
- Coordinates: 69°26′02″N 171°57′11″E
- Country: Russia
- Federal subject: Chukotka Autonomous Okrug
- Administrative district: Chaunsky District
- Founded: 1950 (Julian)
- Abolished: 1998

Population
  - Estimate (2015): 0 )

Municipal status
  - Municipal district: Chaunsky Municipal District
- Time zone: UTC+12 (MSK+9)
- OKTMO ID: 77705000074

Yuzhny (Russian: Ю́жный) is an urban locality (an urban-type settlement) in Chaunsky District of Chukotka Autonomous Okrug, Russia, situated southeast of Chaunskaya Bay, about 70 kilometers (43 mi) south of Pevek, the administrative center of the district. Though the settlement is abandoned, the mining company "Chukotka" still works in the area. As of 2011 Yuzhny was included in the list of settlements to be liquidated.

== History ==
Yuzhny was the first of the gold mines to be opened in Chukotka in 1950, by a group of geologists. Having started out as a normal business employing prospectors, the mines became part of Chaunchukotlag, the local division of the gulag system.

The mines were declared unprofitable and that there was no possibility of developing any other form of economy in 1999 and the settlement was closed along with a number of others in Chukotka. The Russian government guaranteed funds to transport non-working pensioners and the unemployed in liquidated settlements including Yuzhny from Chukotka to other parts of Russia. The Ministry of railways was obliged to lease containers for the transportation of the migrants' goods to the Chukotkan administration and ensure that they were delivered to the various settlements.

== See also ==
- List of inhabited localities in Chaunsky District
