= Baranikha, Kharovsky District, Vologda Oblast =

Baranikha Бараниха
- Village
- Location within Vologda Oblast Location within Russia
- Coordinates: 59°57′N 40°15′E
- Country: Russia
- Region: Vologda Oblast
- District: Kharovsky District
- Time zone: UTC+3:00

Baranikha (Russian: Бараниха) is a rural locality (a village) in Kharovskoye Rural Settlement, Kharovsky District, Vologda Oblast, Russia. The population was 270 as of 2002. There are 4 streets.

== Geography ==
Baranikha is located 3 km northeast of Kharovsk (the district's administrative centre) by road. Ivanikovo is the nearest rural locality.
