= Baranikha, Ivanovo Oblast =

Baranikha Бараниха
- Village
- Location within Ivanovo Oblast Location within Russia
- Coordinates: 57°13′N 42°54′E
- Country: Russia
- Region: Ivanovo Oblast
- District: Yuryevetsky District
- Time zone: UTC+3:00

Baranikha (Russian: Бараниха) is a rural locality (a village) in Yuryevetsky District, Ivanovo Oblast, Russia. Population: 5 (2010 census);

== Geography ==
This rural locality is located 16 kilometres (9.9 mi) from Yuryevets (the district's administrative centre), 119 kilometres (74 mi) from Ivanovo (capital of Ivanovo Oblast) and 358 kilometres (222 mi) from Moscow. Razdyakonikha is the nearest rural locality.
