= Baranikha, Chukotka Autonomous Okrug =

Baranikha Бараниха
- Urban-type settlement (abolished)
- Interactive map of Baranikha
- Location of Baranikha Baranikha (Chukotka Autonomous Okrug)
- Coordinates: 68°31′11″N 168°05′00″E
- Country: Russia
- Federal subject: Chukotka Autonomous Okrug
- Administrative district: Chaunsky District
- Founded: 1960
- Abolished: 1999

Population
  - Estimate (2006): 460 )
- Time zone: UTC+12 (MSK+9)
- Postal code: 689400
- OKTMO ID: 77705000054

Baranikha (Russian: Бара́ниха) is an inhabited locality (an urban-type settlement) in Chaunsky District of Chukotka Autonomous Okrug, Russia. Population: 33 (2002 Census); 1,996 (1989 Soviet census). The 2002 census data shows the population to consist of twenty-three males and ten females, despite the fact that the village had been formally closed in 1999. By 2005, this had fallen to only 15 people according to an environmental impact report for the Kupol Gold Project, although other sources suggest that the population had risen to 460 only a year later.

== Geography ==
The settlement stands in the area of the Rauchuan Range, by the Rauchua River (Bolshaya Baranikha), which it takes its name from. The Baranikha River was initially called Kitepveyem by the Chukchi, meaning "the river of argali" (mountain sheep). The mountain sheep are still common in the surrounding area, and can often be seen on the shores of nearby lakes.

== History ==
=== Origins ===
Local legend holds that a young man was once tricked into becoming the husband of a woman from a village of cannibals. Having been led against his will to their village and forced to use sleight of hand to avoid partaking in a wedding banquet of human flesh, during their wedding night, he killed her with an awl and a knife and escaped in an iron canoe, having drilled holes in all the other wooden canoes. When the bride's family realised she was missing, they checked her room and found her disembodied head, which, apparently, was still sentient, and along with the other villagers gave chase. However, since the canoes were full of holes they sank quickly. Only the woman's head continued the chase, but when it arrived near the man's village, it, along with the wooden canoe, turned into stone on the shores of the mouth of the Baranikha River, close to the present day settlement.

By the beginning of the 19th century, the Baranikha River formed the westernmost boundary of the Chukchi territory.

=== Modern day ===
The present-day settlement was founded in 1960 following the discovery of gold and tin in the region, and a mine named "Twenty-second Congress of the CPSU" was established.

On 30 December 1971, an Aeroflot-owned Ilyushin-14 (CCCP-91570) crashed at the Baranikha airport.

There is a radioisotope thermoelectric generator near the settlement. Access to this generator is unrestricted and in 2000 it was discovered that background radiation levels were found be several times higher than the maximum prescribed norms. However, due to financial difficulties caused by the isolation of this RTG, it has still not been dismantled and evacuated.

The mines were declared unprofitable and there was no possibility of developing any other form of economy in 1999 and the settlement was closed along with a number of others in Chukotka. The Russian government guaranteed funds to transport non-working pensioners and the unemployed in liquidated settlements including Baranikha from Chukotka to other parts of Russia. The Ministry of railways was obliged to lease containers for the transportation of the migrants' goods to the Chukotkan administration and ensure that they were delivered to the various settlements. However, the reality was somewhat different and the logistics of the operation created significant difficulties for many of those people remaining in Baranikha following its closure as reported in a local newspaper:

...The people of Baranikha are still waiting for containers for the transportation of their household goods. The special hardship case families number about a dozen, but there are not enough containers. Twenty five containers ready for dispatch stand at their homes waiting for transportation. It is impossible to get them to Pevek as there are no on-board machines, cranes or forklifts. The people grow more excited by the day, there is no coal and the only local furnace is in the third barracks. Hot water is supplied to the apartments for only one to two hours a day, whilst the inside temperature is about seven degrees Celsius.

— North Star newspaper (Russian: Полярная Звезда)

== Economy ==
Like many of the other settlements in the area which were founded by miners settling here, Baranikha's population has been declining steadily since tin production was reduced. By 1968, the population had reached 3,100 people, but thirty years later, the settlement's population dropped sharply when it was decided that the mine was no longer profitable. As of 2009, Baranikha is included in the list of settlements currently in the process of being liquidated.

=== Transport ===
Baranikha is not connected by permanent road to any other part of the world. However, there is a small network of roads within the settlement including:

- Улица Геологическая (Ulitsa Geologicheskaya, lit. Geological Street)
- Улица Заречная (Ulitsa Zarechnaya)
- Улица Космонавтов (Ulitsa Kosmonavtov, lit. Cosmonaut Street)
- Улица Новая (Ulitsa Novaya, lit. New Street)
- Улица Советская (Ulitsa Sovetskaya, lit. Soviet Street)
- Улица Строительная (Ulitsa Stroitelnaya, lit. Construction Street)
- Улица Чаанайская (Ulitsa Chayanayskaya)
- Улица Школьная (Ulitsa Shkolnaya, lit. School Street)
- Улица Юбилейная (Ulitsa Iubileynaya, lit. Jubilee Street)

== Climate ==
Baranikha has a Tundra climate (ET) because the warmest month has an average temperature between 0 °C (32 °F) and 10 °C (50 °F).

Climate data for Baranikha
Month	Jan	Feb	Mar	Apr	May	Jun	Jul	Aug	Sep	Oct	Nov	Dec	Year
Record high °C (°F)	2 (36)	0 (32)	3.5 (38.3)	10 (50)	16.2 (61.2)	28.0 (82.4)	30 (86)	26.1 (79.0)	22 (72)	5 (41)	2 (36)	−2.8 (27.0)	34.9 (94.8)
Mean daily maximum °C (°F)	−18.3 (−0.9)	−20.4 (−4.7)	−19.9 (−3.8)	−13.7 (7.3)	−2.1 (28.2)	6.7 (44.1)	9.6 (49.3)	7.8 (46.0)	2.4 (36.3)	−6.9 (19.6)	−16.7 (1.9)	−19.6 (−3.3)	−6.5 (20.3)
Mean daily minimum °C (°F)	−23.4 (−10.1)	−26.2 (−15.2)	−25.6 (−14.1)	−19.2 (−2.6)	−6.7 (19.9)	2.1 (35.8)	5.1 (41.2)	4.1 (39.4)	−0.5 (31.1)	−9.7 (14.5)	−19.6 (−3.3)	−22.1 (−7.8)	−11.8 (10.8)
Record low °C (°F)	−51 (−60)	−56 (−69)	−46.4 (−51.5)	−41.1 (−42.0)	−30 (−22)	−9.7 (14.5)	−0.7 (30.7)	−3.2 (26.2)	−18 (0)	−33 (−27)	−44.5 (−48.1)	−47 (−53)	−31.7 (−25.1)
Average rainfall mm (inches)	9 (0.4)	6 (0.2)	3 (0.1)	3 (0.1)	6 (0.2)	6 (0.2)	21 (0.8)	12 (0.5)	9 (0.4)	6 (0.2)	6 (0.2)	9 (0.4)	96 (3.8)
Average snowy days	14	10	8	9	7	2	0	1	9	14	12	12	98

== See also ==
- List of inhabited localities in Chaunsky District
