= Ayon, Russia =

Ayon Айон
- Selo
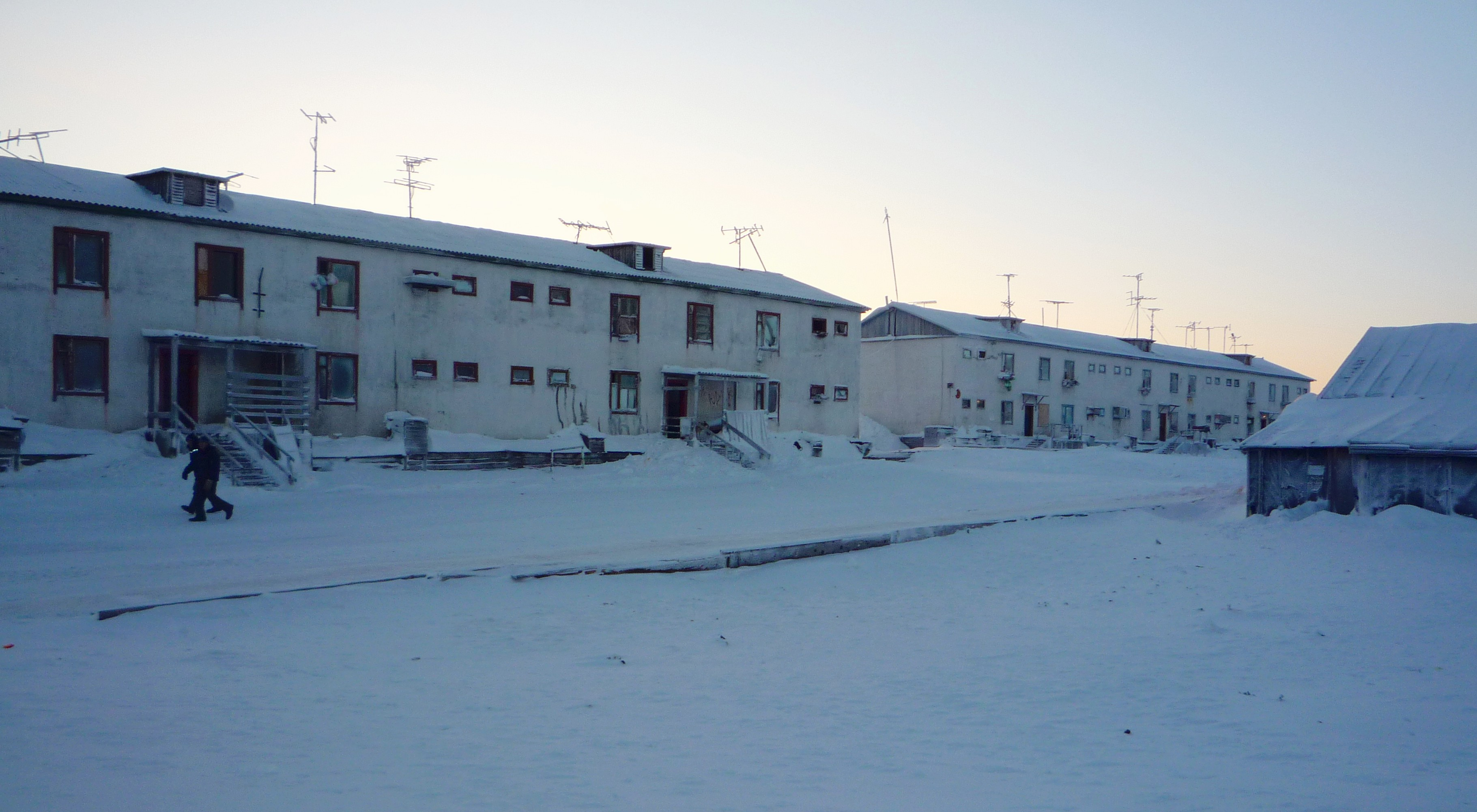
- Houses in Ayon
- Interactive map of Ayon
- Location of Ayon Ayon (Chukotka Autonomous Okrug)
- Coordinates: 69°56′11″N 167°59′40″E
- Country: Russia
- Federal subject: Chukotka Autonomous Okrug
- Administrative district: Chaunsky District
- Ayon: 1940

Population (2010 Census)
  - Total: 252
  - Estimate (January 2016): 203 (−19.4%)

Municipal status
  - Municipal district: Chaunsky Municipal District
  - Rural settlement: Ayon Rural Settlement
  - Capital of: Ayon Rural Settlement
- Time zone: UTC+12 (MSK+9)
- Postal code: 689425
- Dialing code: +7 42737
- OKTMO ID: 77705000106

Ayon (Russian: Айон) is a rural locality (a selo) in Chaunsky District of Chukotka Autonomous Okrug, Russia, situated on the northwestern shores of Ayon Island in the entrance to Chaunskaya Bay. It is the only populated place on the island. Its population was estimated to be 210 (2021 census); Municipally, Ayon is subordinated to Chaunsky Municipal District and is incorporated as the Ayon Rural Settlement.

== History ==
=== Pre-history ===
Archeological investigations have revealed that the village site has been inhabited from the first millennium AD, with the discovery of tools, arrowheads, antlers and the remains of old yaranga indicating that the area has been inhabited for centuries by people engaged in reindeer herding.

=== Pre-soviet period ===
The first mention of Aion was in the writings of Isaya Ignatiev, who landed on the island and traded with the locals living there in 1646, and in 1761, Ayon was visited by the merchant Nikita Shalaurov. There were still indigenous settlers on the island when it was first visited by Ferdinand von Wrangel in 1821, mainly Chukchi engaged in traditional reindeer husbandry. Early Russian visitors to the region including explorer Nikita Shalaurov called the island Zavadey (Russian: Завадей) and later: Sabodey (Russian: Сабодей) by Wrangel, but the island and the village itself was called Ayon from 1875 when the missionary Argentov overheard local Chukchi referring to the area as such, although other sources suggest the date was 1857. The name was initially translated as Marrow Island, although other sources contend that the name is derived from the Chukchi word meaning "brain", as the island's shape is somewhat like a brain. The local expert on Chukotko-Kamchatkan languages, Pyotr Inenlikey, considers that the name derives from the Chukchi word Ayo, meaning revive and that the island is thought of as a place of revival by the indigenous inhabitants. The abundant pastures present on the island (since it lies within Chukotka's Taiga zone) add weight to this theory, as well as the fact that although the island is covered in ice and snow during the winter, in the summer, this melts and the island provides a good pasture for reindeer herds as well as being the home to swarms of midges and gadflies.

=== Soviet period ===
Following the rise of communism in the Soviet Union in the first part of the twentieth century, the teacher Ignat Toroyev (known as "Red Yaranga" (Russian: Красной яранги) came to the island and the native herds were collectivised in 1933 into a group called "Enmitagino". Such collectivisation was very successful on the island and in 1950, the collective in Ayon was turned into a formal Kolkhoz that would eventually have around 22,000 reindeer under its control. In addition to reindeer herding, the new collective was also engaged in sea-hunting and the collection of furs.

A polar station was established on the site of the village in 1941, and the icebreaker Krasin brought Pyotr Sidersky and a crew of seven people to man the new station. This was the first time that the village site had been inhabited permanently, with indigenous people living there only during the summer when the reindeer were taken to pasture, with the exception of a few individuals who would over-winter in order to hunt.

By 1944, the settlement had become increasingly permanent and there were 103 people living in 23 houses.

=== Post-Soviet period ===
However, following the collapse of the Soviet Union, state support was withdrawn and the herders, who had been used to being supplied with the latest technology by the state now found that not only did they have to fend for themselves with regards to the day to day herding, but that there was no guarantee that they would even receive the money they were owed for the meat they provided to the state. The previous collective farm of Emmitagino was replaced by a municipal agricultural enterprise called "Chaunskoye".

The result of this is that the herds have shrunk from 22,000 to only around 4,000 which has caused considerable unemployment in the town. This has led to a lot of drinking, which not only has sociological effects, but the litter produced also encourages disease from which the reindeer now suffer, further reducing the size of the herd.

== Demographics ==
The population according to the 2010 census was 252, of whom 120 were male and 132 female. This represents a slight increase on a January 2009 estimate of 242, though a significant reduction of almost 200 in four years from a 2006 estimate of 440, of which 310 were Chukchi. Although this estimate suggests a significant increase on the 330 people recorded in 2005 in an environmental impact report for the Kupol Gold Project.

== Economy ==
Reindeer herding is still the dominant economic driver in the village. A new agricultural enterprise has been established since the collapse of the Soviet Union and it still holds the name "Enmitagino". The herd is reported as having fallen to 2,700, but is now growing.

=== Transport ===
Because the settlement is on an island, it is somewhat difficult to reach. There is no road or bridge linking the island with the mainland. A winter road exists when the bay is frozen, but during spring and summer, the only way to the settlement is by helicopter. There is however, a small network of roads within the village including:

- Улица Иненликея (Ulitsa Inenlikeya)
- Улица Островная (Ulitsa Ostrovnaya, lit. Island Street)
- Улица Пугачева (Ulitsa Pugacheva)
- Улица Северная (Ulitsa Severnaya, lit. North Street)
- Улица Школьная (Ulitsa Shkolnaya, lit. School Street)

Every year the transportation of food, fuel and other logistical cargo is arranged on a winter ice road. The average length of paving the road is 120 km, depending on the state of the ice in the East Siberian Sea, and this winter road is normally in operation for about two months (from early March to late April-early May). Beyond the use of this ice road and marine transport, passenger transportation to Anadyr is carried out by helicopter to 1–2 times a month.

== Climate ==
Ayon has a tundra climate (Köppen climate classification ET) with bitterly cold, long winters and short, cool summers.

Climate data for Ayon (1943~2012)
Month	Jan	Feb	Mar	Apr	May	Jun	Jul	Aug	Sep	Oct	Nov	Dec	Year
Record high °C (°F)	0.9 (33.6)	−0.5 (31.1)	1.1 (34.0)	2.1 (35.8)	16.4 (61.5)	29.2 (84.6)	30.5 (86.9)	25.5 (77.9)	18.5 (65.3)	12.5 (54.5)	2.6 (36.7)	4.4 (39.9)	30.5 (86.9)
Mean daily maximum °C (°F)	−24.4 (−11.9)	−25.9 (−14.6)	−22.4 (−8.3)	−14.5 (5.9)	−2.6 (27.3)	7.4 (45.3)	9.9 (49.8)	7.8 (46.0)	2.7 (36.9)	−6.6 (20.1)	−16.5 (2.3)	−22.7 (−8.9)	−8.9 (16.0)
Daily mean °C (°F)	−27.8 (−18.0)	−29.2 (−20.6)	−25.9 (−14.6)	−18.6 (−1.5)	−5.8 (21.6)	3.0 (37.4)	5.0 (41.0)	4.0 (39.2)	0.2 (32.4)	−9.2 (15.4)	−19.7 (−3.5)	−26.0 (−14.8)	−12.4 (9.7)
Mean daily minimum °C (°F)	−31.2 (−24.2)	−32.5 (−26.5)	−29.5 (−21.1)	−22.6 (−8.7)	−9.2 (15.4)	−0.3 (31.5)	1.5 (34.7)	1.1 (34.0)	−2.1 (28.2)	−12.2 (10.0)	−23.1 (−9.6)	−29.3 (−20.7)	−15.7 (3.7)
Record low °C (°F)	−48.5 (−55.3)	−51.3 (−60.3)	−44.4 (−47.9)	−39.0 (−38.2)	−31.7 (−25.1)	−12.0 (10.4)	−4.2 (24.4)	−7.2 (19.0)	−15.4 (4.3)	−34.5 (−30.1)	−43.1 (−45.6)	−45.3 (−49.5)	−51.3 (−60.3)
Average precipitation mm (inches)	11.6 (0.46)	8.9 (0.35)	6.4 (0.25)	7.2 (0.28)	7.1 (0.28)	10.2 (0.40)	21.5 (0.85)	23.7 (0.93)	16.9 (0.67)	18.4 (0.72)	12.6 (0.50)	10.6 (0.42)	155.0 (6.10)
Average precipitation days	10.3	8.7	7.8	8.3	8.2	7.4	10	12	13.5	17.4	12.1	10.2	126.0
Mean monthly sunshine hours	4	49	180	267	258	276	235	147	83	45	9	0	1,553

== Photo gallery ==
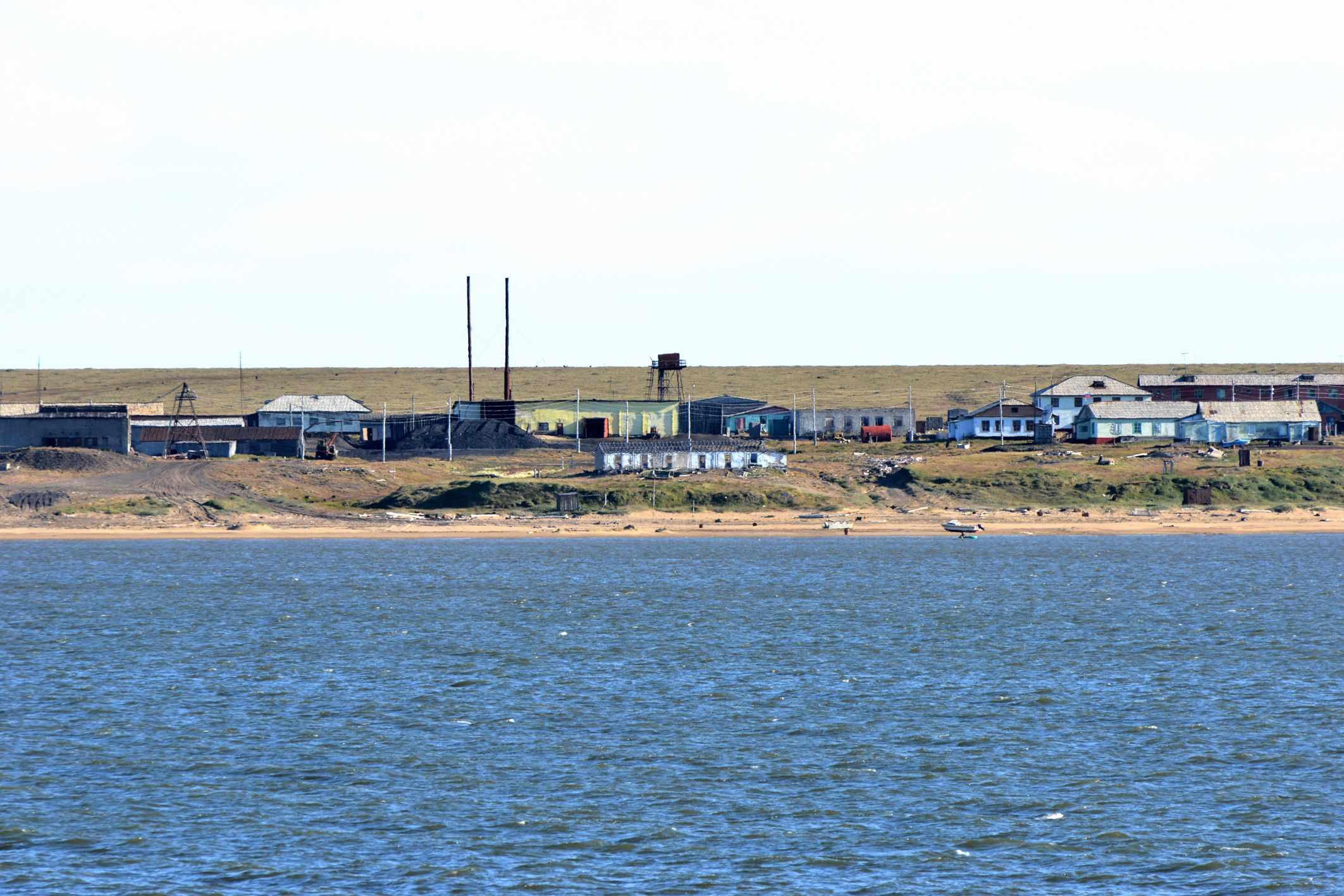
Ayon village on Ayon Island

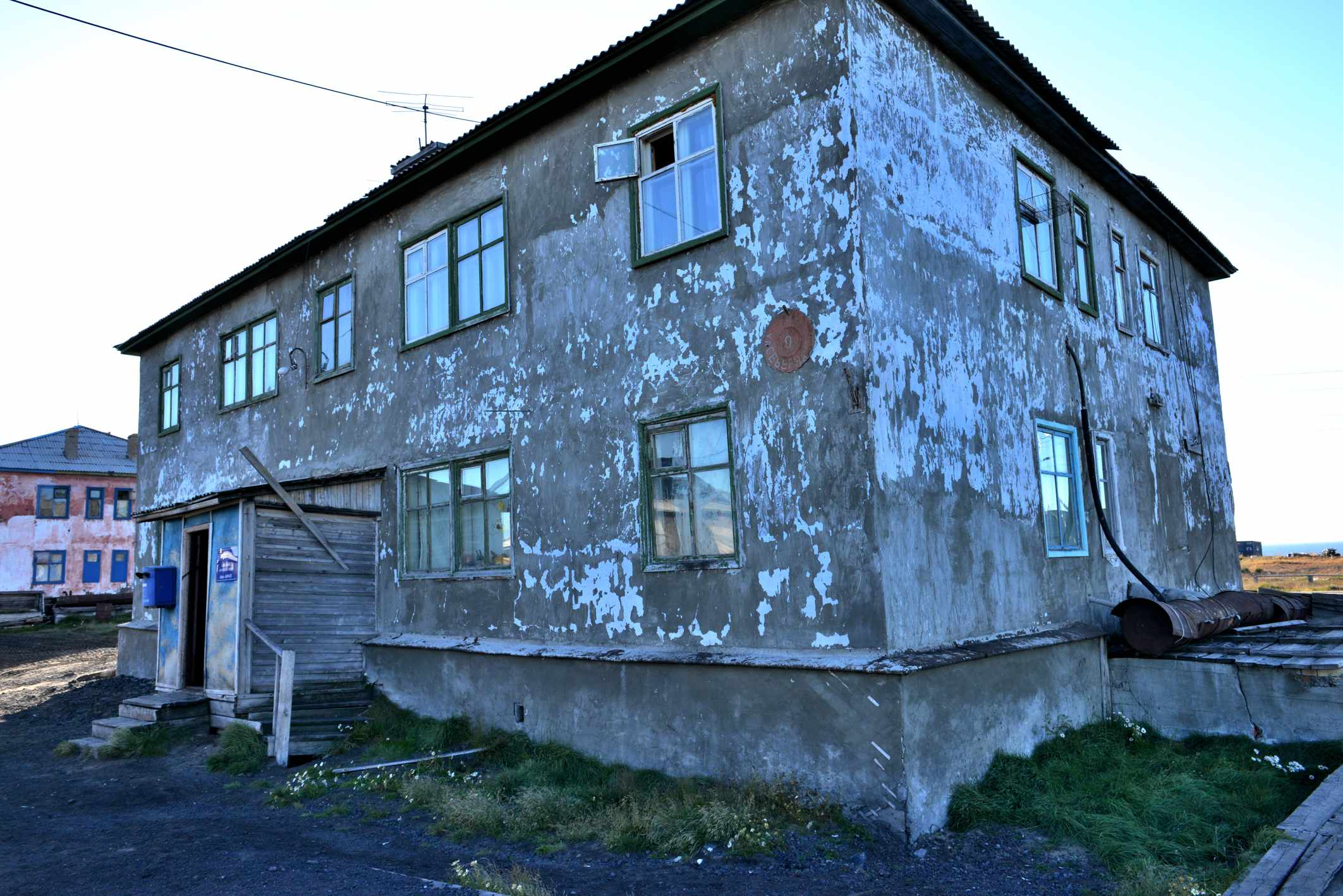
Ayon, Post Office building

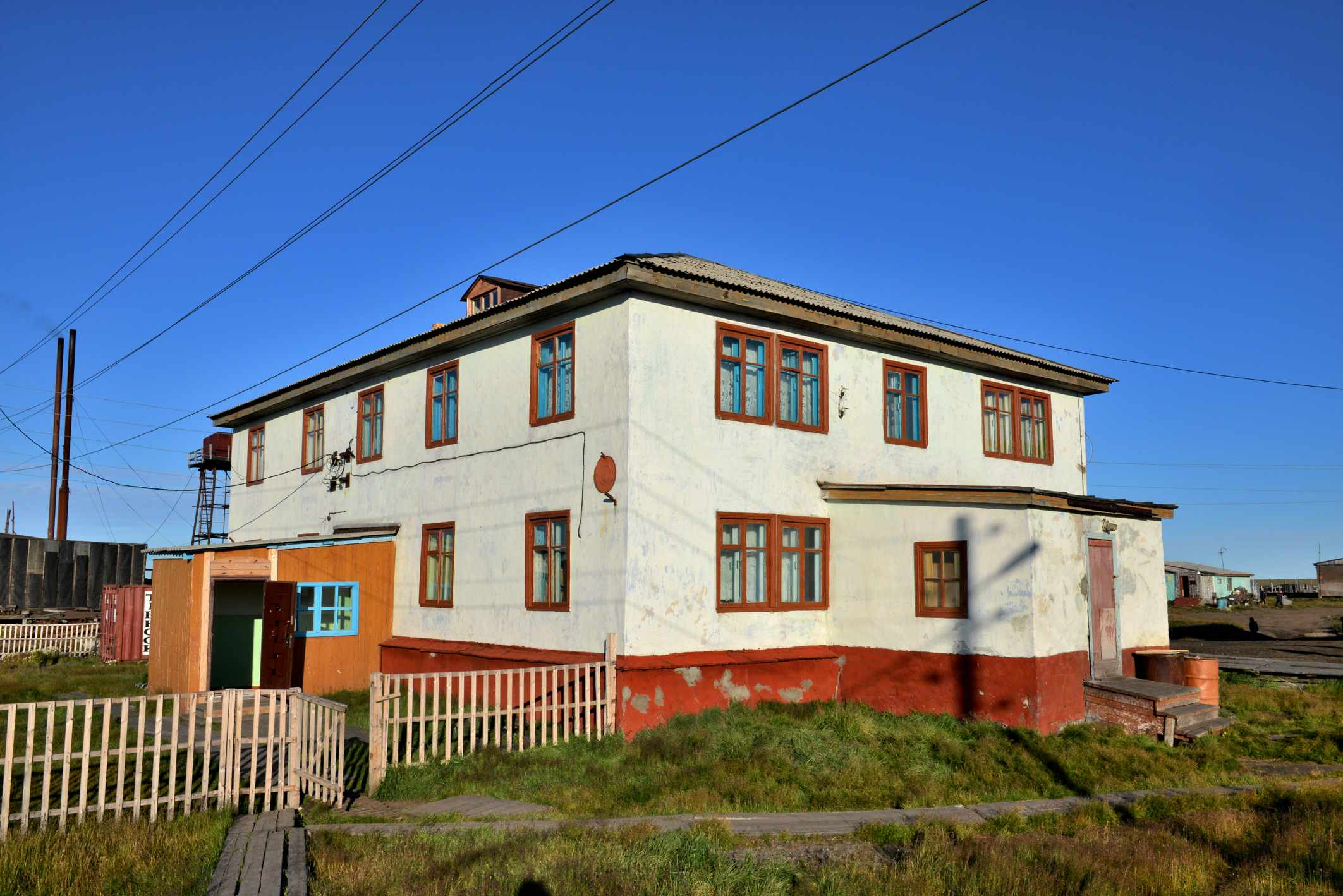
Ayon, schoolhouse (with residential school)

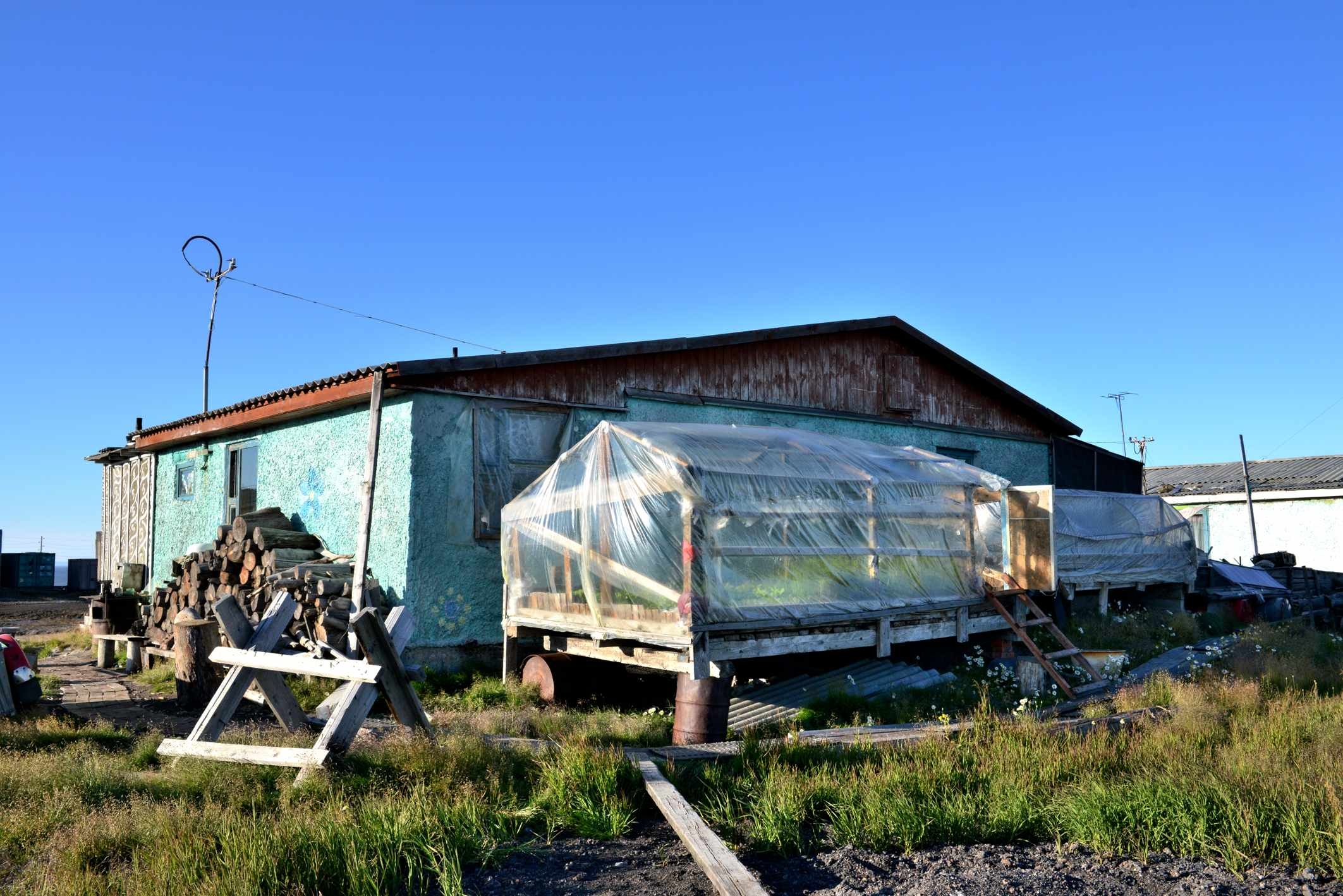
Ayon, private building with greenhouse

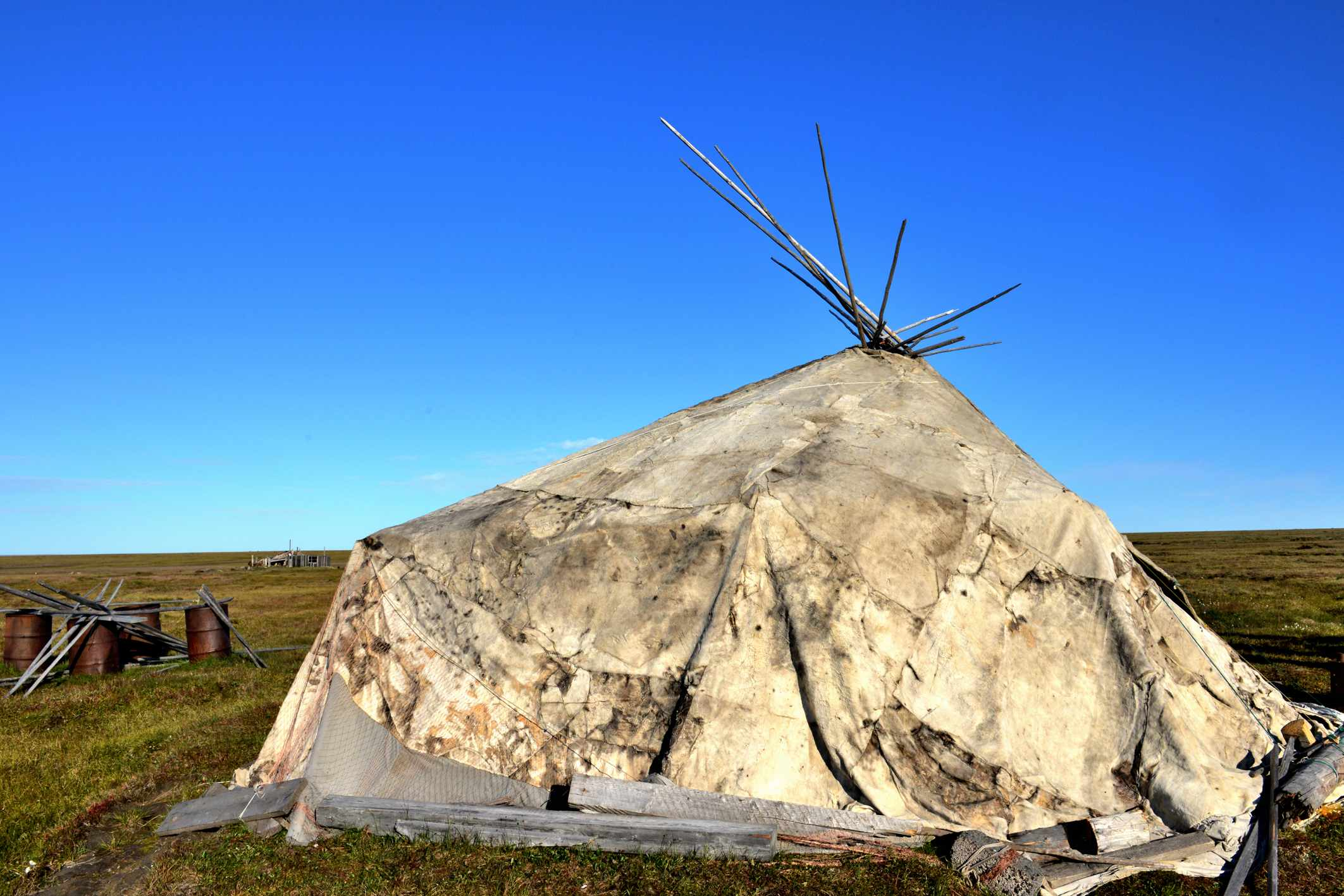
Ayon, Yaranga (Chukchi tent)

== See also ==
- List of inhabited localities in Chaunsky District

== Notes ==
=== Sources ===
- Bema Gold Corporation Environmental Impact Assessment, Kupol Gold Project, Far East Russia June 2005.
- Дума Чукотского автономного округа. Закон №33-ОЗ от 30 июня 1998 г. «Об административно-территориальном устройстве Чукотского автономного округа», в ред. Закона №55-ОЗ от 9 июня 2012 г. «О внесении изменений в Закон Чукотского автономного округа "Об административно-территориальном устройстве Чукотского автономного округа"». Вступил в силу по истечении десяти дней со дня его официального опубликования. Опубликован: "Ведомости", №7 (28), 14 мая 1999 г. (Duma of Chukotka Autonomous Okrug. Law #33-OZ of June 30, 1998 On the Administrative-Territorial Structure of Chukotka Autonomous Okrug, as amended by the Law #55-OZ of June 9, 2012 On Amending the Law of Chukotka Autonomous Okrug "On the Administrative-Territorial Structure of Chukotka Autonomous Okrug". Effective as of after ten days from the day of the official publication.). (in Russian)
- Дума Чукотского автономного округа. Закон №46-ОЗ от 29 ноября 2004 г. «О статусе, границах и административных центрах муниципальных образований на территории Чаунского района Чукотского автономного округа», в ред. Закона №125-ОЗ от 2 декабря 2011 г. «О внесении изменений в Приложение 2 к Закону Чукотского автономного округа "О статусе, границах и административных центрах муниципальных образований на территории Чаунского района Чукотского автономного округа"». Вступил в силу через десять дней со дня официального опубликования. Опубликован: "Ведомости", №31/1 (178/1), 10 декабря 2004 г. (Duma of Chukotka Autonomous Okrug. Law #46-OZ of November 29, 2004 On the Status, Borders, and Administrative Centers of the Municipal Formations on the Territory of Chaunsky District of Chukotka Autonomous Okrug, as amended by the Law #125-OZ of December 2, 2011 On Amending Appendix 2 of the Law of Chukotka Autonomous Okrug "On the Status, Borders, and Administrative Centers of the Municipal Formations on the Territory of Chaunsky District of Chukotka Autonomous Okrug". Effective as of the day which is ten days after the official publication date.). (in Russian)
- McKnight, Tom L; Hess, Darrel (2000). "Climate Zones and Types". Physical Geography: A Landscape Appreciation. Upper Saddle River, NJ: Prentice Hall. ISBN 0-13-020263-0.
- M Strogoff, P-C Brochet, and D. Auzias Petit Futé: Chukotka (2006). "Avant-Garde" Publishing House.
