= Ryon =

Ryon is both a surname and a given name. Notable people with the name include:

== Given name ==
- Ryon Bell (b. 1978), Canadian motorcycle trials rider
- Ryon Bingham, American football player
- Ryon Healy, American baseball player

== Surname ==
- Augustus M. Ryon (1862–1949), American mining engineer
- Bailey Ryon (born 2002), American actress
- John Walker Ryon, American politician
- Luann Ryon, American archer
- Rex Ryon, American film and television actor
- Ruth Ryon (1944–2014), American real estate columnist

== See also ==
- Ronas Ryon, American racehorse
