= Rauchua =

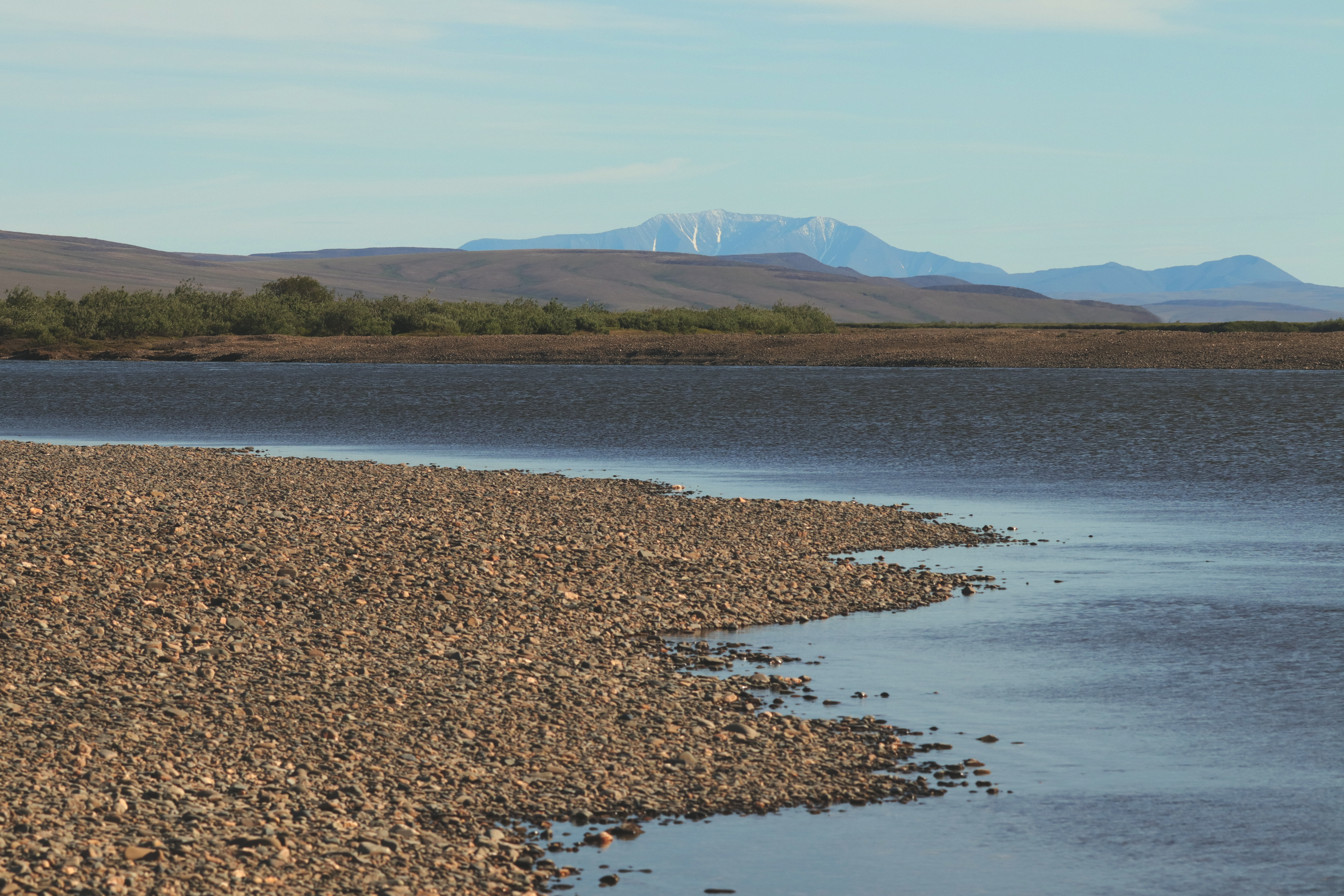

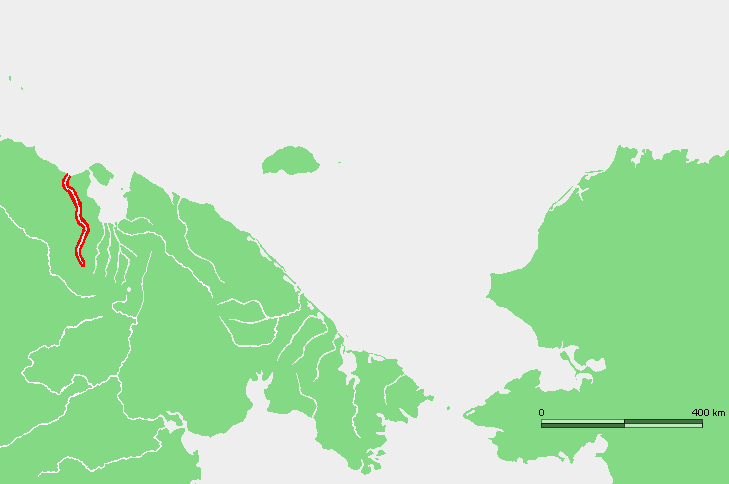
- Location of the Rauchua course

Location
- Country: Russia

Physical characteristics
- Mouth: East Siberian Sea
  - coordinates: 69.4988°N 166.7196°E
- Length: 323 km (201 mi)
- Basin size: 15,400 km^{2} (5,900 sq mi)

The Rauchua (Russian: Раучуа, also: Большая Бараниха Bolshaya Baranikha) is a river in Far East Siberia, Russia. It is 323 kilometres (201 mi) long, and has a drainage basin of 15,400 square kilometres (5,900 sq mi).

Remains of frozen mammoths have been found near the Rauchua.

== Course ==
Its source is in the Ilirney Range. It passes through the sparsely populated areas of the Siberian tundra and flows northwards into the Kolyma Gulf, East Siberian Sea, not far west from Ayon Island.

The Rauchua and its tributaries belong to the Chukotka Autonomous Okrug administrative region of Russia.
