= Komsomolsky, Chukotka Autonomous Okrug =

Urban settlement in Russia

Komsomolsky Комсомольский
- Work settlement (abolished)
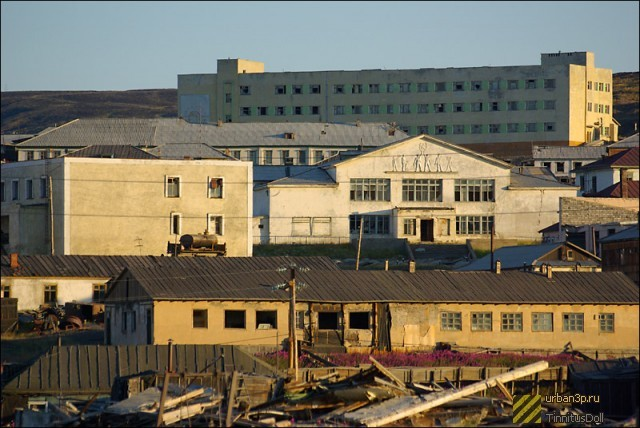
- Komsomolsky, 2008
- Interactive map of Komsomolsky
- Location of Komsomolsky Komsomolsky (Chukotka Autonomous Okrug)
- Coordinates: 69°10′00″N 172°42′00″E
- Country: Russia
- Federal subject: Chukotka Autonomous Okrug
- Administrative district: Chaunsky District
- Founded: 1959
- Abolished: 1998

Population
  - Estimate (2015): 0 )
- Time zone: UTC+12 (MSK+9)
- Postal code: 689415
- OKTMO ID: 77705000066

Komsomolsky (Russian: Комсомо́льский) is an Uninhabited locality (an urban-type settlement) in Chaunsky District of Chukotka Autonomous Okrug, Russia, located about 100 kilometers (62 mi) south-west of Pevek, the administrative centre of the district. Population: 597 (2002 census); 3,794 (1989 Soviet census). According to an environmental impact report produced for the Kupol Gold Project, by 2005 the population had fallen further to just 508.

== Geography ==
Komsomolsky is located at the base of the Ichuvuveyem Hills, on the banks of the Ichuveyem River. The river's name is from the Chukchi for "river with rich pastures", an increasingly ironic derivation considering that the main economic driver in the area is now gold mining which is destroying the reindeer's pastures.

== History ==
=== Soviet Period ===
Komsomolsky first started as the "Sredniy Ichuveem" section of the Krasnoarmeyskiy mine, the Komsomolsky gold mine was established here on June 26th, 1959. It is one of a number of inhabited localities of varying size throughout the former Soviet Union named after the Komsomol, the Soviet youth movement. Indeed, it was members of the Komsomol who were the first settlers in the area, who all volunteered, at least initially, to come to Chukotka to start mining when the settlement was founded in 1959 or were prisoners or deportees without the right to leave, and the mine soon became one of the largest in the country. Barely thirty years later, it was decided that it was no longer economically viable and the settlement was mostly depopulated by 1998. Though the number of people in the settlement has shrunk considerably, there is still a population, with most of the remaining populous employees of the Chukotka Industrial Co-operative, or part of Quasar, the other gold mining enterprise in the area. As of 2009, however, Komsomolsky is included in the list of settlements currently in the process of being liquidated.

=== Post-Soviet Period ===
In recent years, Komsomolsky has benefited from increased spending in the region, particularly in the realm of transportation, where part of a 3.5 billion-ruble bridge building and road construction project, the Anadyr Highway, improved transport connections with Pevek and Bilibino as part of a Chukotka-wide project. The ultimate goal of this project is to provide a direct road link between the Sakha Republic, Magadan Oblast, and Chukotka.

The immediate environment has been shaped significantly by industry, though visitors to the area may see a rare piece of equipment, a gold-washing dredge, being used. Due to the short gold-washing season caused by the arctic climate, the dredge is used 24 hours a day.

== Population ==
The mines were declared unprofitable and that there was no possibility of developing any other form of economy in 1999 and the settlement was closed along with a number of others in Chukotka. The Russian government guaranteed funds to transport non-working pensioners and the unemployed in liquidated settlements including Komsomolsky from Chukotka to other parts of Russia. The Ministry of railways was obliged to lease containers for the transportation of the migrants' goods to the Chukotkan administration and ensure that they were delivered to the various settlements. The population table below shows the impact on the settlement as a result of the closure of the mines.

Demographic Evolution
1959	1970	1979	1989	2002	2005	2007	2010	2015
470	1,642	2,166	3,794	597	508	416	0	0

== Transport ==
Komsomolsky is connected via a road network to Pevek, Bystry and Krasnoarmeysky along with a number of other local settlements, but it is not connected by permanent road to any other part of the district or Chukotka. There is however, a small road network within the settlement including:

- Улица Артеева (Ulitsa Arteeva)
- Улица Ватапваамовская (Ulitsa Vatapvaamovskaya – the Vatapvaam is a local river)
- Улица Горняцкая (Ulitsa Gornyatskaya)
- Улица Заречная (Ulitsa Zarechnaya)
- Улица Комсомольская (Ulitsa Komsomolskaya, lit. Komsomol Street)
- Улица Космодемьянской (Ulitsa Kosmodemyanskoye)
- Улица Красноармейская (Ulitsa Krasnoarmeyskaya, li. Red Army Street)
- Улица Ленина (Ulitsa Lenina, lit. Lenin Street)
- Улица Новая (Ulitsa Novaya, lit. New Street)
- Улица Строительная (Ulitsa Stroitelnaya, lit. Construction Street)
- Улица Терешковой (Ulitsa Tereshkovoye)
- Улица Титова (Ulitsa Titova)
- Улица Чукотка (Ulitsa Chukotka, lit. Chukotka Street)
- Улица Южная (Ulitsa Yuzhnaya, lit. South Street)

== See also ==
- List of inhabited localities in Chaunsky District
