= Baranikha, Vozhegodsky District, Vologda Oblast =

Baranikha Бараниха
- Village
- Location within Vologda Oblast Location within Russia
- Coordinates: 60°40′N 39°36′E
- Country: Russia
- Region: Vologda Oblast
- District: Vozhegodsky District
- Time zone: UTC+3:00

Baranikha (Russian: Бараниха) is a rural locality (a village) in Tigisnkoye Rural Settlement, Vozhegodsky District, Vologda Oblast, Russia. The population was 11 as of 2002.

== Geography ==
Baranikha is located 52 km northwest of Vozhega (the district's administrative centre) by road. Gora is the nearest rural locality.
