= Ayon Island =

Island in the East Siberian Sea

Ayon
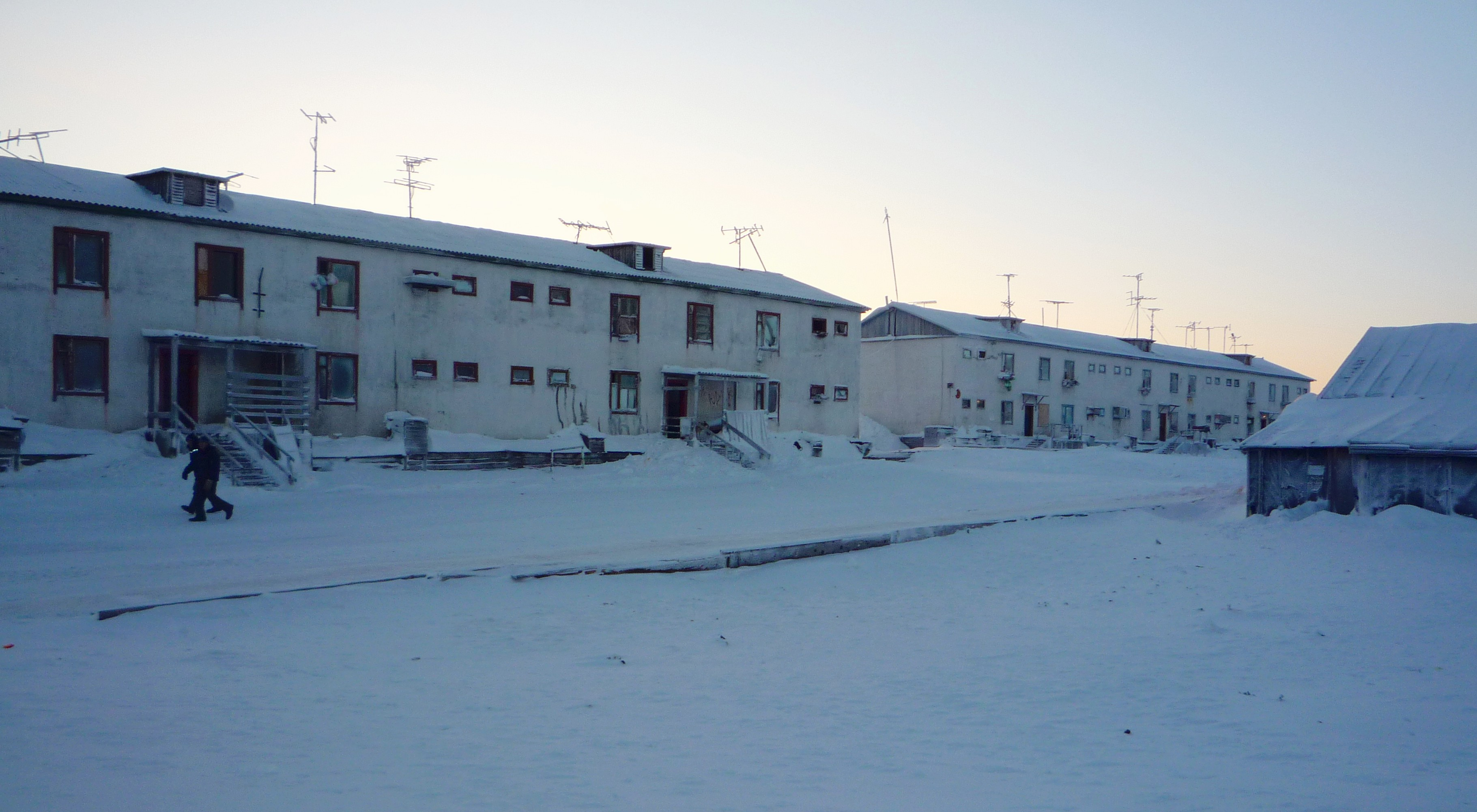
- View of the village on Ayon Island

- Location within Chukotka Autonomous Okrug

Geography
- Location: East Siberian Sea
- Coordinates: 69°47′40.59″N 168°39′37.03″E
- Area: 2,156 km^{2} (832 sq mi)
- Length: 63 km (39.1 mi)
- Width: 38 km (23.6 mi)
- Coastline: 550 km (342 mi)

Administration
- Russia
- Okrug: Chukotka Autonomous Okrug

Demographics
- Population: 440 (2006)
- Pop. density: 0.2/km^{2} (0.5/sq mi)
- Ethnic groups: Chukchi

Ayon Island is an island in the coast of Chukotka in the East Siberian Sea. The island itself consists mainly of low-lying tundra, and is primarily populated by the Chukchi people, who use the tundra as pasture for their reindeer herds.

== Geography ==
It is located on the western side of the Chaunskaya Bay, directly off the Nutel'gyrgym Peninsula, at the eastern end of the Kolyma Gulf. The island is 63 km (39 mi) long and 38 km (24 mi) wide with an area of 2,156 km^{2} (832 sq mi) and a coastline of 550 km (340 mi). It is generally low and flat and there are many small lakes and swamps. Ayon Island is separated from the mainland by the Maly Chaunsky Strait, a shallow channel which is barely 2 km (1.2 mi) wide in its narrowest spot. The bay to the south and east is Chaunskaya Guba. Administratively and municipally, Ayon Island belongs to Chaunsky District, part of Chukotka Autonomous Okrug of the Russian Federation.

There are two small settlements, Elvuney (now abandoned) and Ayon in the northwestern end of the island.

== Etymology ==
The name of the island is thought to come from one of two sources. Firstly, it is suggested that it comes from the Chukchi word "Ayo", meaning "brain", as the islands shape is somewhat like a brain. The second school of though is that it is derived from Chukchi meaning "coming alive", in reference to the fact that although the island is covered in ice and snow during the winter, in the summer, this melts and the island provides a good pasture for reindeer herds as well as being the home to swarms of midges and gadflies.

== Economy ==
=== Soviet Russia ===
Following the rise of communism in the Soviet Union in the first part of the twentieth century, the native herds were collectivised in 1933 into a group called "Enmitagino". Such collectivisation was very successful on the island and in 1950, the collective in Ayon was turned into a formal Kolkhoz that would eventually have around 22,000 reindeer under its control. In addition to reindeer herding, the new collective was also engaged in sea-hunting and the collection of furs.

A polar station was established on the site of the village in 1941 and the icebreaker Krasin brought Pyotr Sidersky and a crew of seven people to man the new station. This was the first time that the village site had been inhabited permanently, with indigenous people living there only during the summer when the reindeer were taken to pasture, with the exception of a few individuals who would over-winter in order to hunt.

By 1944, the settlement had become increasingly permanent and there were 103 people living in 23 houses.

=== Post-Soviet ===
Following the collapse of the Soviet Union, state support was withdrawn and the herders, were no longer supplied with new technology by the state, and were not guaranteed to receive money they were owed for the meat they provided to the state.

The result of this was the herds shrinking from nearly 22,000 to only around 4,000, gradually growing into a considerably high level of unemployment in the town. This led to a spike in alcohol abuse, specifically vodka drinking, which fuels sociological problems and public intoxication, and causes sanitation issues associated with public urination and defecation. This, combined with public dumps, littered vodka bottles, and general trash can breed pathogens leading to disease. Some deadly infections can spread to reindeer, as they may come into contact with these waste areas, further reducing the size of the herd.

== Adjacent islands ==
- Ryyanranot Island (Ostrov Ryyanranot) 69.992°N 168.608°E is an 8 km (5.0 mi) long and 1.5 km (0.93 mi) wide island located off the northern shores of Ayon Island. It is separated from it by a 1.2 km (0.75 mi) wide sound.
- Chengkuul Island (Ostrov Chengkuul) 69.930°N 169.226°E is 10.5 km (6.5 mi) long and 1.7 km (1.1 mi) at its widest point. It is located off the northeastern coast of Ayon Island, separated from it by a 5 km (3.1 mi) wide sound. Its western end is also known as Yanrachenkool.
- Mosey Island (Ostrov Mosey) 69.648°N 169.234°E is a small island located between the southern coast of Ayon and the continent. It is 3 km (1.9 mi) in length.

== See also ==
- List of inhabited localities in Chaunsky District
- List of islands of Russia
