= Krasnoarmeysky, Chukotka Autonomous Okrug =

Krasnoarmeysky Красноармейский Пырӄаӄай (Chukchi)
- Urban-type settlement (abolished)
- Interactive map of Krasnoarmeysky
- Location of Krasnoarmeysky Krasnoarmeysky (Chukotka Autonomous Okrug)
- Coordinates: 69°32′29″N 171°59′38″E
- Country: Russia
- Federal subject: Chukotka Autonomous Okrug
- Administrative district: Chaunsky District
- Founded: 1940
- Abolished: 1998

Population
  - Estimate (2002): 0 )
- Time zone: UTC+12 (MSK+9)
- Postal code: 686631
- OKTMO ID: 77705000070

Krasnoarmeysky (Russian: Красноармейский, literally Red Army; Chukot: Пырӄаӄай, Pyrḳaḳaj) was an inhabited locality (an urban-type settlement) in Chaunsky District of Chukotka Autonomous Okrug, Russia. Population: 0 (2002 Census); 2,299 (1989 Soviet census)

== History ==
The settlement was founded in March 1940 on the banks of the Pyrkanayvaam River, 100 km from Pevek to house the miners and administrative workers from the Pyrkakay (Russian: Пыркакай) tin mine, with the name being changed to Krasnoarmeysky in January 1942 to honour the victories of the Red Army. It was given settlement status in 1953, but was determined to no longer be economically viable in 1998. As of 2009, Krasnoarmeysky is included in the list of settlements currently in the process of being liquidated.

== Population ==
The mines were declared unprofitable and that there was no possibility of developing any other form of economy in 1999 and the settlement was closed along with a number of others in Chukotka. The Russian government guaranteed funds to transport non-working pensioners and the unemployed in liquidated settlements including Krasnoarmeysky from Chukotka to other parts of Russia. The Ministry of Railways was obliged to lease containers for the transportation of the migrants' goods to the Chukotkan administration and ensure that they were delivered to the various settlements. The population table below shows the impact on the settlement as a result of the closure of the mines.

Demographic evolution
| 1959 | 1970 | 1979 | 1989 | 2002 |
|---|---|---|---|---|
| 1156 | 1583 | 2324 | 2290 | 0 |

== Climate ==
Krasnoarmeysky has a Tundra climate (ET) because the warmest month has an average temperature between 0 °C (32 °F) and 10 °C (50 °F).

Climate data for Krasnoarmeysky
| Month | Jan | Feb | Mar | Apr | May | Jun | Jul | Aug | Sep | Oct | Nov | Dec | Year |
|---|---|---|---|---|---|---|---|---|---|---|---|---|---|
| Record high °C (°F) | −2 (28) | −0.8 (30.6) | 0 (32) | 28.1 (82.6) | 18.1 (64.6) | 28.1 (82.6) | 29.8 (85.6) | 24.7 (76.5) | 18 (64) | 16 (61) | 9 (48) | 9 (48) | 29.8 (85.6) |
| Mean daily maximum °C (°F) | −15.9 (3.4) | −17.6 (0.3) | −16.1 (3.0) | −10.7 (12.7) | 0 (32) | 9.3 (48.7) | 11.3 (52.3) | 8 (46) | 1.6 (34.9) | −7.4 (18.7) | −14.1 (6.6) | −17 (1) | −4.3 (24.3) |
| Mean daily minimum °C (°F) | −20.4 (−4.7) | −23.3 (−9.9) | −22.3 (−8.1) | −17.1 (1.2) | −4.5 (23.9) | 3.6 (38.5) | 5.7 (42.3) | 2.8 (37.0) | −1.9 (28.6) | −10.5 (13.1) | −17.5 (0.5) | −20 (−4) | −10.5 (13.1) |
| Record low °C (°F) | −45 (−49) | −46 (−51) | −42.3 (−44.1) | −36.7 (−34.1) | −26 (−15) | −6 (21) | −2.2 (28.0) | −6.8 (19.8) | −19.3 (−2.7) | −42 (−44) | −41 (−42) | −43 (−45) | −46 (−51) |
| Average rainfall mm (inches) | 36 (1.4) | 6 (0.2) | 6 (0.2) | 3 (0.1) | 3 (0.1) | 6 (0.2) | 21 (0.8) | 12 (0.5) | 12 (0.5) | 6 (0.2) | 9 (0.4) | 12 (0.5) | 132 (5.2) |
| Average snowy days | 15 | 11 | 10 | 11 | 9 | 2 | 1 | 3 | 11 | 15 | 15 | 15 | 118 |

== See also ==
- List of inhabited localities in Chaunsky District
