= Snezhnoye, Chukotka Autonomous Okrug =

Snezhnoye Снежное Ӄээԓивтын (Chukchi)
- Selo
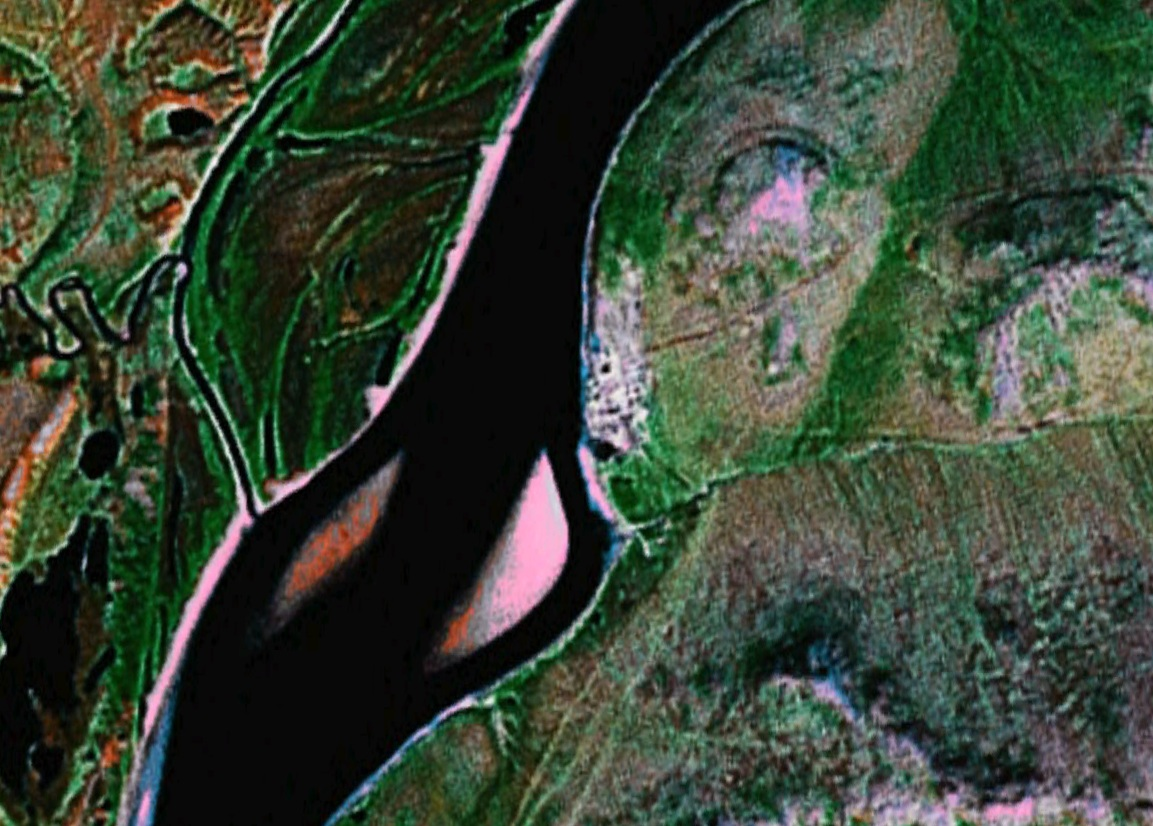
- Satellite photograph of Snezhnoye on the eastern banks of the Anadyr River
- Interactive map of Snezhnoye
- Location of Snezhnoye Snezhnoye (Chukotka Autonomous Okrug)
- Coordinates: 65°26′50″N 172°58′44″E
- Country: Russia
- Federal subject: Chukotka Autonomous Okrug
- Administrative district: Anadyrsky District
- Founded: 1920s

Population (2010 Census)
  - Total: 311
  - Estimate (January 2018): 234 (−24.8%)

Municipal status
  - Municipal district: Anadyrsky Municipal District
  - Rural settlement: Snezhnoye Rural Settlement
  - Capital of: Snezhnoye Rural Settlement
- Time zone: UTC+12 (MSK+9)
- Postal code: 689541
- Dialing code: +7 93380
- OKTMO ID: 77603445101

Snezhnoye (Russian: Сне́жное, lit. snowy; Chukchi: Ӄээԓивтын, Ḳèèḷivtyn, lit. snowfield) is a rural locality (a selo) in Anadyrsky District of Chukotka Autonomous Okrug, Russia, located southwest of the selo of Ust-Belaya. Within the framework of municipal divisions, Snezhnoye is incorporated within Snezhnoye Rural Settlement of Anadyrsky Municipal District. Population: 311 (2010 census); 350 (2011 est.).

It was founded by Soviet planners as a part of the first selsoviet in Chukotka and was at one time a major center for reindeer herding. There is also evidence that the site of the modern locality and the surrounding areas have been inhabited since the Neolithic. However, since the dissolution of the Soviet Union, the local economy has suffered significantly, both in terms of the viability of the reindeer herds, essential to the locality, as well as an exodus of Russians, due to repeated delays in salary payments and an overall decline in living conditions.

== History and economy ==
=== Prehistory ===
Even though the site for modern Snezhnoye was not decided upon until 1929, archaeological excavations revealed a number of Neolithic camps in its vicinity. One of such findings was a red flint flake, discovered about 15 kilometers (9.3 mi) to the northeast. Further discoveries were made on a small raised area near the river, where obsidian and blade-like flakes were found, as well as within the boundaries of Snezhnoye itself. To the southeast of Snezhnoye, in an area where indigenous people used to live in yarangas, a quartz scraper from the Neolithic was discovered, along with an oval skreblo (a wider scraper). On the river bank by the locality, test pits were dug and, although overall the revealed cultural layer was poor, dozens more flakes and blades were excavated. Opposite this site, investigations by the local director of the radio station revealed a large prismatic obsidian core.

=== Soviet history and economy ===
Snezhnoye is located in an area where the Chukchi are the dominant indigenous people. Unlike many of the other native localities in Chukotka, which are usually former kolkhozes (collective farms) created where an indigenous settlement originally stood, Snezhnoye was a completely original settlement founded in the late 1920s as one of the first such farms in the national okrug. As a result, despite the Chukchi's dominance in the surrounding area, Snezhnoye's ethnicities include Koryaks, Evens, Chuvans, Russians, and Ukrainians, as well as the Chukchi.

In addition to being established as a brand new settlement, Snezhnoye was also created as a sovkhoz (a state farm) from the very beginning, despite the usual practice being the collectivization first into kolkhozes, which were transformed into sovkhozes at a later date. The name "Snezhnoye", literally meaning "snowy", is after the Chukchi word keyelivtyn (кээливтын), used by the Chukchi to refer to the area and also meaning "snowy".

Snezhnoye was the first sovkhoz (known as Anadyrsky) created in Chukotka in 1928 or 1929, following direct targeting by the Soviet Department of Agriculture. Originally it covered an area of some 3,000,000 hectares (7,400,000 acres). The locality was established primarily as an experiment in bringing Communism to the Russian Far East, with the rationale that if it could be made to work in Chukotka, then it could be made to work anywhere in the Russian North. This experiment was designed to test the sovkhoz as the main means of collectively organizing reindeer husbandry. The importance of this experiment was underlined when Ivan Druri from the sovkhoz in Lovozero in Murmansk Okrug of Leningrad Oblast, where the first such enterprise for studying reindeer had been established three years previously, traveled across almost the whole of Russia to Snezhnoye to assist with the establishment of the sovkhoz there, and to discuss with the local herders new methods of reindeer husbandry while living and working among them. The expert native herders, however, were given menial roles at first, while the Russians and Ukrainians, who had no specific experience of this type of operation, were assigned to the managerial posts.

Such approach notwithstanding, the sovkhoz was a success and enjoyed growth throughout the Soviet period, providing a regular salary from the state to its employees from the very start, granting considerable purchasing power in local stores and allowing the local population out in the tundra the chance to purchase new furniture and even television sets. Unlike in kolkhozes, where farmers spent a certain amount of time working on plots of land allocated to them, this practice was not so common in sovkhozes, and the population of Snezhnoye, despite their ability to use the local shops, supplemented their diet by foraging in the tundra for berries and wild mushrooms.

=== Post-Soviet history and economy ===
Reindeer herding continues to be the main source of employment in the locality, although the imposition of a Soviet, centrally planned reindeer husbandry system has had a devastating effect on traditional indigenous practices. Following the dissolution of the Soviet Union, then-President Boris Yeltsin issued a number of decrees, which obliged all state-run enterprises, including sovkhozes, to re-organize themselves as joint-stock companies or private farms. In the ensuing chaos, the reindeer herds were all but decimated, with the farm no longer receiving any government support. Initially, the locality was designed to provide assistance to up to ten reindeer herding brigades, each with herds in excess of 2,000 animals; however, by 1997 only two herds and less than 20% the original number of reindeer remained.

Following the collapse of Anadyrsky Sovkhoz the reindeer herders split into three groups. Three of the remaining four brigades chose to remain with the farm, with the remnants of the sovkhoz renamed Agricultural Enterprise Sovkhoz Anadyrsky (сельскохозяйственное предприятие совхоз Анадырский). One brigade decided to work independently of the sovkhoz, took a portion of the land, and struck out on their own, although the brigadier is now back with the main farm, since it proved too difficult to barter for supplies with the other three brigades. The remaining few families withdrew from the tundra completely and focused on establishing local farms. Those who remained in one of the two groups tending the reindeer on the tundra were generally related to those families who had originally owned the reindeer prior to the establishment of the sovkhoz and almost all those still involved in reindeer herding in Snezhnoye have family ties which keep them in the region.

In 1996, eighty-six people, or more than half the total workforce, were directly employed by the remnants of the sovkhoz, the only productive enterprise remaining. The remainder of the workforce was employed in ancillary roles, working as teachers (as the school was the largest employer after the sovkhoz), in the House of Culture, in general administration, in shops, or in utilities.

After the death of all the male elders in a short period of time from a variety of causes (including suicide,) very few people remained who had first-hand knowledge of traditional Chukchi reindeer husbandry methods following decades of Soviet doctrine. The sovkhoz was partially abandoned, with many of the local people noting the continuing involvement in herding by the "respected old men", as they were locally known, in the more successful brigades in Ust-Belaya. This economic collapse caused almost all of the senior employees of the sovkhoz to leave, joined by many Russians who had occupied senior positions in ancillary roles and who were no longer paid the high salaries and other benefits which had initially attracted them to the region. The head clerk in the local administration, along with the sovkhoz's chief economist and the bank clerk, were among those positions vacated. This created a vacuum in the local economy that, due to the complete lack of trained individuals, was not filled for some time until the standards required for a number of roles were reduced. The vacated technical positions included the clerk serving the Head of the Administration (who was replaced by an indigenous woman without training and who was unable to keep the records properly), the economist (which remained unfilled), and the bank branch (which simply closed, forcing everyone to travel to Ust-Belaya for any banking needs). Local indigenous people have now filled this vacuum, but that in turn resulted in creating a further vacuum out on the tundra. The lack of experienced herders in the tundra creates additional problems for the surviving reindeer husbandry enterprises. In one year, a number of deer were lost because herders failed to drive the female deer across a river before the ice melted so that they could join the bulls. There were no calves produced that year.

In addition to essentially removing the whole management structure, the dissolution of the Soviet Union also brought hardship to the herders. By 1996, they were owed payment for more than three years and while their salaries were still recorded in the official accounts, so were their expenses for food and other essentials meaning that a number were actually in debt to the sovkhoz. The end of state funding for the sovkhoz left many of these farmers very poor and at the bottom of the social ladder. By 1998, many had left Snezhnoye in search of more reliable employment. Further class differentiation was driven not by differing salaries, but by the differing lengths of delay in paying them. Those who remain working for the sovkhoz find that there salaries are delayed much more regularly, and for longer periods than those who work for the local administration and ancillary services, causing foraging for berries and wild mushrooms to become a vital means for those employed by the sovkhoz to acquire products with which they could barter for other essential supplies. The situation was such that the need for foraging and poaching as a means of survival for the employees of the sovkhoz had grown to such a level that these formerly privatized enterprises were brought back under the wing of the municipal authorities.

The effects of the reduction in population and the collapse of the local economy led to a significant risk that the locality might be closed, a fate that had befallen a significant number of rural localities in the preceding decades. This is exemplified in letters such as the one below, sent from Anadyr in 2007:

...Our native village of Snezhnoye in the Anadyr District is up for closing. Some officials from the Area Government in Anadyr and also from Moscow, we don't know who they were, visited the village recently. They have told people, without any explanation, that they better start packing. They were offered new residence in the villages of Kanchalan, Krasneno, Khatyrka, even in the central areas of Russia. The residents of Snezhnoye at their village meeting decided to write a letter to the Governor. No one wants to move from the ancestral land. Please advise us to whom else they should write, so that their pleas are heard and the village is left alone. My parents live there; they do not want to move either, just would like to live peacefully in their homeland...

— Anonymous author, letter to Igor Krupnik, from Anadyr,

== Geography ==
Snezhnoye is situated in the tundra, on the banks of the Anadyr River, in the center of Anadyrsky District, about 20 kilometers (12 mi) upstream of Ust-Belaya and about 300 kilometers (190 mi) upstream from Anadyr. The river provides good fishing all year round and a wide variety of mushrooms and berries allow the residents to supplement their diet through foraging. Snezhnoye also lies within an official nature conservation area.

== Climate ==
Snezhnoye has a continental Subarctic or boreal (taiga) climate (Dfc), where specifically the summer is wetter than the winter according to the Köppen climate classification. The climate is bitterly cold for most of the year, with temperatures on average below freezing from the end of September until the start of May, with a reasonable chance of snow from October through May. Summers are short, lasting between June and August, and very wet, with more than half of the annual rainfall occurring during these three months. February is the coldest month and July is the warmest.

Climate data for Snezhnoye
Month	Jan	Feb	Mar	Apr	May	Jun	Jul	Aug	Sep	Oct	Nov	Dec	Year
Record high °C (°F)	−0.8 (30.6)	5.7 (42.3)	12 (54)	8.1 (46.6)	19 (66)	32 (90)	33 (91)	27.9 (82.2)	18.2 (64.8)	10 (50)	16.3 (61.3)	1 (34)	33 (91)
Mean daily maximum °C (°F)	−19.7 (−3.5)	−20.4 (−4.7)	−16.8 (1.8)	−10 (14)	3.5 (38.3)	14.9 (58.8)	17.1 (62.8)	13.6 (56.5)	6.5 (43.7)	−6.1 (21.0)	−17.1 (1.2)	−20.6 (−5.1)	−4.6 (23.7)
Mean daily minimum °C (°F)	−24.3 (−11.7)	−26.9 (−16.4)	−26.1 (−15.0)	−20.6 (−5.1)	−5 (23)	4.1 (39.4)	7.2 (45.0)	4.5 (40.1)	−2.4 (27.7)	−12.5 (9.5)	−23.4 (−10.1)	−25.9 (−14.6)	−12.6 (9.3)
Record low °C (°F)	−55.1 (−67.2)	−52 (−62)	−49.9 (−57.8)	−43.2 (−45.8)	−28.9 (−20.0)	−5.6 (21.9)	−5.6 (21.9)	−7.2 (19.0)	−17 (1)	−37 (−35)	−46.7 (−52.1)	−50 (−58)	−55.1 (−67.2)
Average rainfall mm (inches)	15 (0.6)	12 (0.5)	6 (0.2)	15 (0.6)	9 (0.4)	27 (1.1)	54 (2.1)	36 (1.4)	18 (0.7)	18 (0.7)	15 (0.6)	12 (0.5)	207 (8.1)
Average snowy days	15	14	11	11	8	1	0	0	4	13	12	17	106

== Demographics ==
In 1996, the population was 376, living in 122 households, with the average household containing 3.1 individuals, an amount that decreased slightly to just 3 by 2003. The ethnic composition was as follows:

Demographic Composition – 1996
Indigenous people	Number	Percentage of population
Chukchi	177	47%
Chuvans	102	27%
Russians	60	16%
Others*	37	10%
Total	376	100%

*Others consists of a number of different ethnic groups including Chuvash, Evenk, Jews, Itelmens, Komi, Koryak, Lamuts, Nenets, Ukrainians, Yukaghir, and Yakuts.

The number of indigenous people went down between 1996 and 2002, when they were estimated at 215, a reduction of 62. Three years later, an environmental impact report prepared for the Kupol Gold Project reported a total population of 305, all of indigenous origin, suggesting a significant increase of 26 in the number of indigenous people and indicating that all non-indigenous people had left (a reduction of at least 60), though the data in this report appears to contradict other demographic sources. The following year, the population was reported at 385, an overall increase of 80 people, of whom 340 were indigenous people, predominantly Chukchi. An overall increase in indigenous people alone was 35. 2010 census results recorded a population of 311, of whom 156 were male and 155 female. The most recent population estimate, taken from the official website of Anadyrsky District, indicates a population of only 350, an increase of 39 on the most recent census data, but does not provide a split between indigenous and non-indigenous people or by gender.

== Infrastructure ==
The infrastructure in Snezhnoye is extremely basic. Apart from two apartment buildings which have cold water only, at the end of the 20th century there was no plumbing at all, with water obtained centrally, drawn directly from the Anadyr River and distributed via central standpipes, and bathing restricted to once a week. Sewage was deposited in communal waste areas, though there were no removal services provided by the district. In addition to sewage, the outskirts of Snezhnoye have turned into a scrapyard of rusting metal and broken machinery, since the barges that used to take away such refuse no longer call.

Communications have suffered considerably. During the Soviet period, every apartment had a telephone, with free calls across the okrug. Now there is only one antiquated wind-up phone shared between the local administration and the general population. There is no direct dial, so an operator in Anadyr must connect any call manually.

There is a school which provides education to third grade level. For further education, children must attend a boarding school in Ust-Belaya, about 20 kilometers (12 mi) away. Attempts were made in the 1990s to provide further education locally, but despite offering free accommodation in one of the few apartments with running water, the task of attracting any teachers proved to be futile. The existing junior school teachers attempted to take on the workload themselves, but were unable to manage and the classes ceased. In the first half of 2012, further discussions were held with the residents regarding the expansion of educational opportunities. Available space was identified in the current kindergarten building and another search for a teacher has begun.

Of the 122 households in 1996, 22 owned land, with plots averaging 0.2 hectares (0.49 acres). These households are divided into three types of housing: old single-story multiple unit buildings, more modern two-story buildings (used by senior sovkhoz personnel), and the most modern two-story apartment buildings. The buildings make the locality look more like a city in miniature than an isolated herders settlement.

In a bid to improve local services, the opening hours of the post office were extended in 2012. Currently the post office is open for three hours a day between Monday and Friday, and is closed on Saturday and Sunday. In addition to the post office and the kindergarten, there were also a club, a shop, and a library. Power is provided by a diesel power station. The same report also indicates that there is now a boiler room, suggesting that the issues with hot water mentioned above may have been addressed.

There are four streets in Snezhnoye: Sovetskaya, Naberezhnaya, Tsentralnaya, and Tundrovaya.

== Culture ==
Media penetration is now almost non-existent, with subscription rates to the local newspaper Krayny Sever too expensive for most inhabitants. Only one television channel is available (which, incidentally, is not the one broadcasting programs relevant to reindeer herders).

The indigenous residents still celebrate traditional festivals, and a collection of traditional local folktales was collected by Lyubov Uvarovskaya under the title Tales from Snezhnoye Village.

== Transportation ==
There are no roads linking Snezhnoye to the outside world. Regular cars are restricted to travel within the locality only, while any outside travel requires utilizing an all-terrain tracked vehicle. In summer and fall, the only way to reach Snezhnoye is either by helicopter, or by barge along the Anadyr River, which is used to bring cargo to and from Snezhnoye as well as Ust-Belaya, Markovo, and Vayegi. Flights to Snezhnoye from Anadyr are via Ust-Belaya. These flights are limited with a total of only seventeen seats, of which only five or fewer are allocated to residents of Snezhnoye. In winter, a winter road along the Anadyr River is laid by the all-terrain vehicles.

In the summer of 2011, a new transport link was established; the boat Storm now performs a return journey between Anadyr and Snezhnoye, calling also at Ust-Belaya during the summer months. The return journey takes three days and is in addition to weekly helicopter flights.

== See also ==
- List of inhabited localities in Anadyrsky District
