= Anadyrsky District =

Anadyrsky District Анадырский район (Russian)
- District
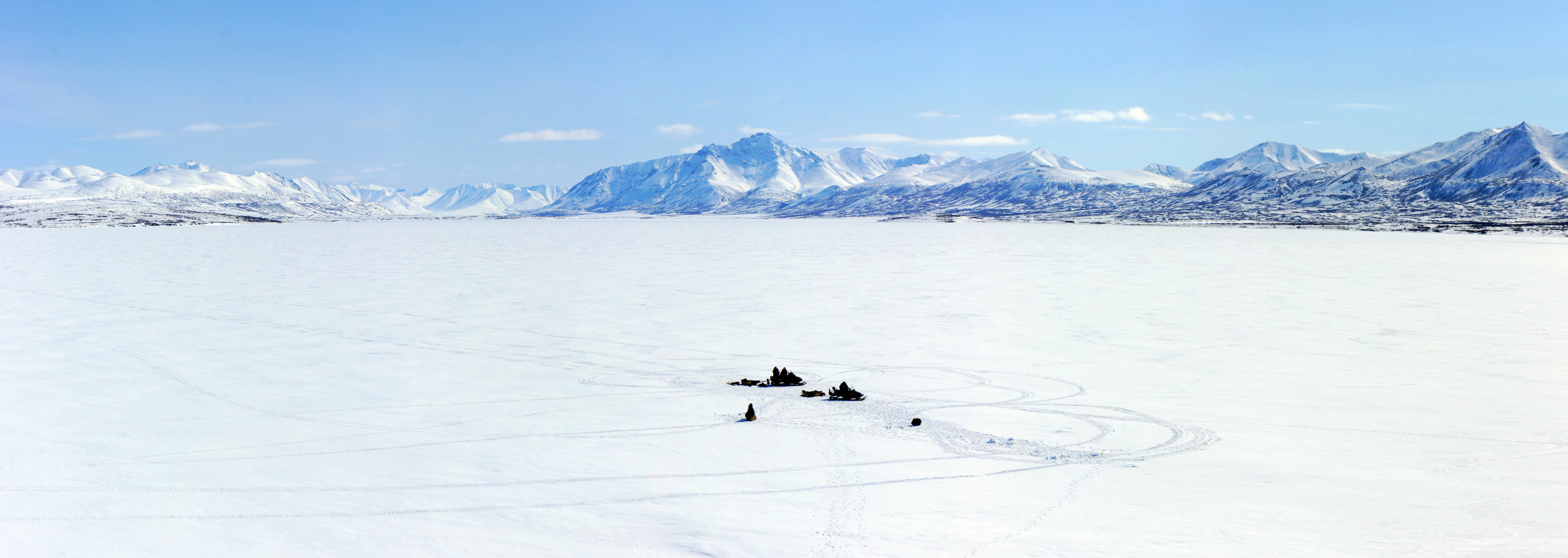
- Winter view across Lake Maynits in Anadyrsky District

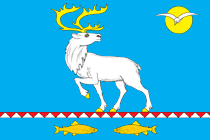
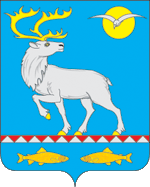
- Flag Coat of arms
- Location of Anadyrsky District in Chukotka Autonomous Okrug
- Coordinates: 65°16′48″N 172°38′56″E
- Country: Russia
- Federal subject: Chukotka Autonomous Okrug
- Established: 1927 MISCELLANEA----
- Administrative center: Anadyr

Government
  - Type: Local government
  - Body: ----STATISTICS----
  - Head: Vladimir Vildyaykin

Area
  - Total: 287,508 km^{2} (111,007 sq mi)

Population (2010 Census)
  - Total: 6,935
  - Estimate (January 2016): 8,571
  - Density: 0.02412/km^{2} (0.06247/sq mi)
  - Urban: 48.6%
  - Rural: 51.4%

Administrative structure
  - Inhabited localities: 4 urban-type settlements, 11 rural localities

Municipal structure
  - Municipally incorporated as: Anadyrsky Municipal District
  - Municipal divisions: 2 urban settlements, 10 rural settlements
- Time zone: UTC+12 (MSK+9)
- OKTMO ID: 77603000
- Holiday: ----ADMINISTRATIVE STATUS----
- Website: http://anadyr-mr.ru/

Anadyrsky District (Russian: Ана́дырский райо́н; Chukchi: Кагыргын район, Kagyrgyn rajon) is an administrative and municipal district (raion), one of the six in Chukotka Autonomous Okrug, Russia. It is located in the central and southern parts of the autonomous okrug and borders with Chaunsky District in the northwest, Iultinsky District in the north and northeast, the Gulf of Anadyr in the east, Koryak Okrug in the south, and with Bilibinsky District in the west and northwest. It also completely surrounds the territory of the town of okrug significance of Anadyr. The area of the district is 287,900 square kilometers (111,200 sq mi). Its administrative center is the town of Anadyr (which is not administratively a part of the district). Population: 8,161 (2021 census); 6,935 (2010 census); 8,007 (2002 census); 40,475 (1989 Soviet census).

Historical population
Year	Pop.	±%
1939	5,410	—
1959	8,190	+51.4%
1970	22,155	+170.5%
1979	20,831	−6.0%
1989	40,475	+94.3%
2002	8,007	−80.2%
2010	9,436	+17.8%
2021	8,161	−13.5%
Source: Census data

In terms of area, this is the largest district in the autonomous okrug. The district is located in a mountainous region, the peaks of which provide the catchment areas for the Anadyr River and its tributaries. The district is home to a large number of indigenous peoples as well as Russians and Ukrainians. Humans have been living in what is now Anadyrsky District for at least five thousand years. Following the foundation of the first Russian-speaking settlements by Semyon Dezhnyov, this territory became the key part of the region in terms of trade, exploration, and administration, which still continues today.

== Geography ==
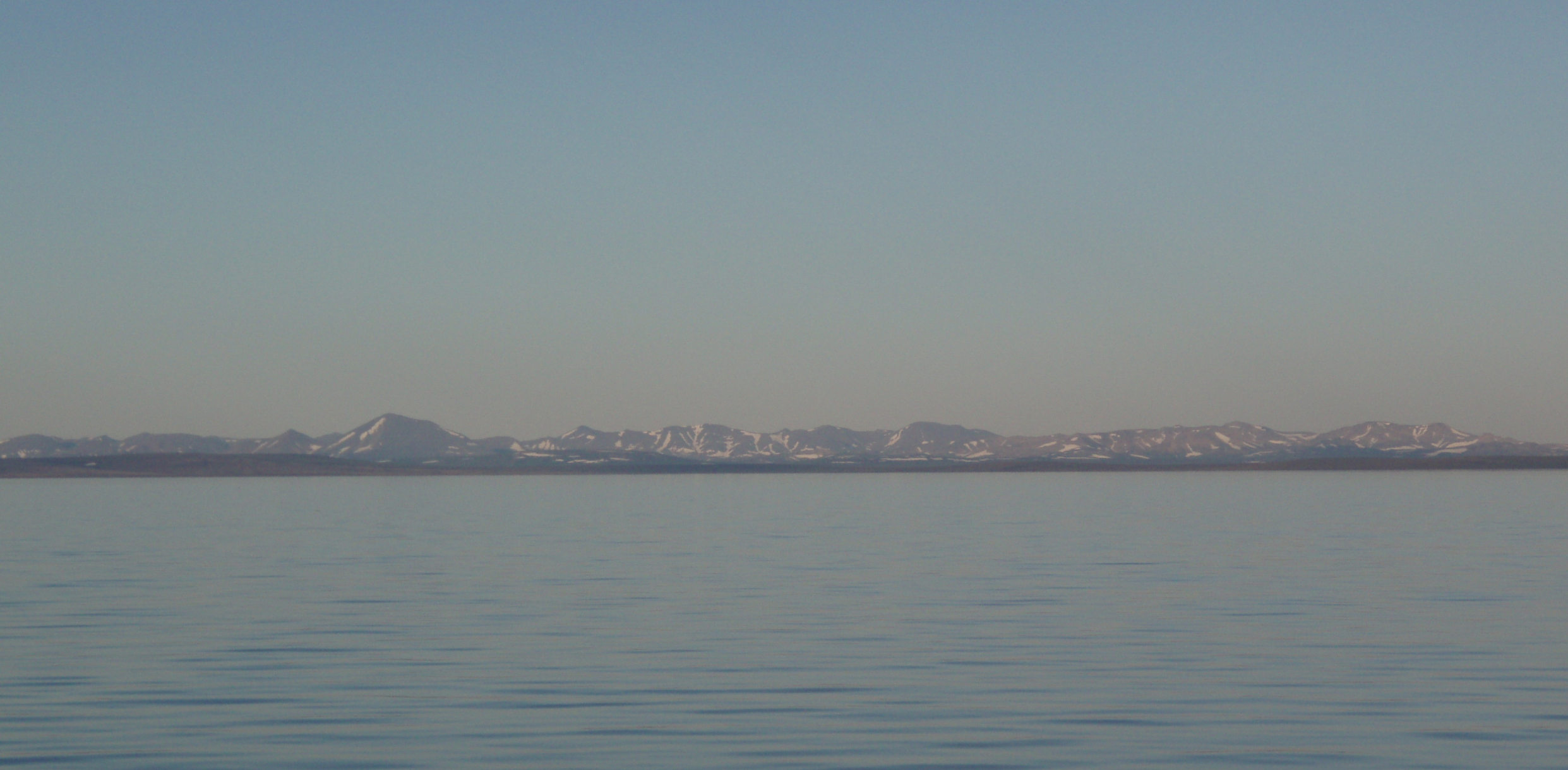
View across Lake Krasnoye, the largest lake in the Anadyrsky Liman, toward the Rarytkin Range

Anadyrsky District is the largest district within Chukotka, with the territory of the district corresponding closely to the basin of the Anadyr River. It covers much of the interior of Chukotka. The eastern border consists of a coastline on the Bering Sea.

The vastness of the district means that natural conditions within it vary considerably, from the mountainous tundra found in the north, to impenetrable woodland in the south, to wind-lashed coast to the east. The district, particularly its eastern part, is dominated by the 800-kilometer (500 mi) long Anadyr River, which forms an estuary known as the Anadyrsky Liman emptying into the Gulf of Anadyr. All of the major inhabited localities on the territory of the district (Anadyr, Ugolnye Kopi, and Shakhtyorsky) are found on the banks of this estuary. The boundary between the estuary and the Gulf of Anadyr is marked by the Russkaya Koshka (where "koshka" is a local term meaning "a spit"). The vast majority of all inhabited localities of any size are to be found either along the Anadyr or one of its tributaries.

The Anadyr Highlands and Pekulney mountain range are found in the north and northwest of the district, within which the upper reaches of the Anadyr River drain.

More southerly tributaries of the Anadyr River, such as the Mayn, have their sources in the spurs of the Koryak Mountains in the south of the district. Lake Maynits is located in the central part of the Ukvushvuynen Range and lake Yanragytgyn near the northern slopes. Vaamochka and Pekulney are coastal lagoons that lie on the southern side of the range. The Khatyrka river forms the boundary in the southern part of the district. The northern part of the Komeutyuyam Range is in the district. The northeasternmost extent of the taiga is found in the west of the district, on Opalyonnaya Mountain, near the selo of Markovo.

A large part of the district is covered by the Anadyr Valley, consisting of two distinct sections: a plain extending from Anadyrsky Liman in the east approximately 500 kilometers (310 mi) to Markovo and a more elevated region within the Shchuchy Range. For a district dominated by a major river and its tributaries, it is unsurprising that the interior is dominated by wetlands covering tens of thousands of square kilometers. These wetlands create innumerable small lakes, although only there is only one large lake, Lake Krasnoye with the area of 458 square kilometers (177 sq mi), in the entire district. The Anadyr Valley opens out into a large estuary containing the Onemen Bay and the Gulf of Anadyr. The district is also home to Lake Elgygytgyn, found in the center of an impact crater created just under three and a half million years ago.

The easternmost part of the district is covered by the Uelkalskaya tundra, and the area of the Anadyr Estuary contains a number of shingle spits and intertidal silt flats.

=== Ecology ===
Anadyrsky District contains four of the seven zakazniks (regional-level protected areas) in Chukotka, all of which are inherited from the times of the Soviet Union. These are: Tundrovy, a 500,000-hectare (1,200,000-acre) reserve founded in 1971; Ust-Tanyurensky, founded in 1974 and covering 450,000 hectares (1,100,000 acres); Tumansky, a reserve covering 389,000 hectares (960,000 acres) and founded in 1971; and Lebediny, which was founded in 1984 and is the newest zakaznik in the district; it covers 250,000 hectares (620,000 acres). Following the merger of Anadyrsky and Beringovsky Districts, Anadyrsky District also acquired responsibility for Avtatkuul zakaznik, a 160,000-hectare (400,000-acre) reserve, founded in 1971.

While these reserves exist officially, budgetary constraints in the early part of the 21st century resulted in inadequate funding. Ust-Tanyurensky is the only zakaznik in the district to employ a member of staff, and Lebediny zakaznik does not even appear as a separate item on the Game Department's budget.

Tundrovy zakaznik was established specifically to protect migrating and nesting birds including eiders, swans, and several species of goose. Ust-Tanyurensky zakaznik protects a transitional area between woodland and tundra also containing swans, geese, and other migratory birds. Tumansky and Avtatkuul are coastal reserves, while Lebediny is a reserve found between the Anadyr and Mayn Rivers, all of which protect similar species to the other zakazniks.

== Demographics ==
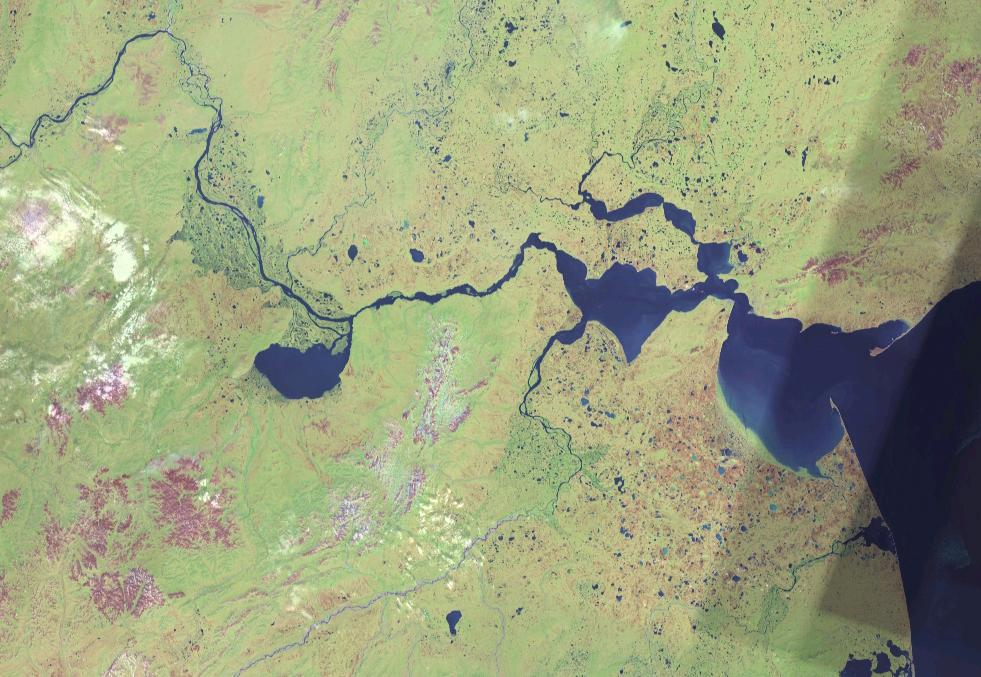
Lower Anadyr River, showing the Gulf of Onemen and the Gulf of Anadyr

Approximately three-quarters of the population is of non-indigenous origin; mainly Russian and Ukrainian. These people either migrated to the Far East, or are the descendants of those who did, enticed by the higher pay, large pensions, and more generous allowances permitted to those prepared to endure the cold and the isolation, as well as those who were exiled here as a result of one of Stalin's purges after having been released from the Gulag.

Although only consisting of 27% of the total population of the district, this is formed of a considerable number of different indigenous peoples. The most represented indigenous people are the Chukchi, who are present in all but the most westerly and northwesterly parts of the district. The Evens are more populous in Bilibinsky District but are also found in the west and northwest of Anadyrsky District. The Koryaks, originally native across much of Siberia, were pushed into Kamchatka by the Evens, but have now moved over the border into Chukotka as well and are now found in the southwest of the district. Also found are the Yukaghirs and Chuvans, who occupy a small area of land in the far west of the district near the border with Bilibinsky District surrounding the selo of Chuvanskoye.

According to an environmental impact report produced by Bema Gold for the Kupol gold project in 2005, the indigenous population of Anadyrsky Municipal District for 2003 was 3,033. Of these indigenous people, 60% were Chukchi, 25% Chuvan, 5% Lamut, and 4% Even. These people were part of the population of ten of the inhabited localities within the district. There were approximately the following numbers of indigenous people in 2003 in Anadyrsky Municipal District's inhabited localities:

- Snezhnoye: 317 (100%)
- Chuvanskoye: 222 (100%)
- Lamutskoye: 212 (100%)
- Kanchalan: 540 (85%)
- Vayegi: 379 (83%)
- Ust-Belaya: 685 (79%)
- Krasneno: 92 (78%)
- Markovo: 476 (55%)
- Shakhtyorsky: 17 (18%)
- Ugolnye Kopi: 93 (3%)

Anadyrsky District shares many demographic similarities with Chaunsky District to the north. As the population of Chaunsky District is centered mainly around Pevek, so, too, the majority of the population of Anadyrsky District is concentrated in Ugolnye Kopi. Anadyr, the administrative center of the autonomous okrug, while administratively separate from the district, also serves as a population hub of the area. The remainder of the population is scattered throughout a handful of smaller localities. As Chaunsky District is served by the Pevek Airport, the second largest in the autonomous okrug, so is Anadyrsky District served by the Ugolny Airport.

== History ==
=== Prehistory ===
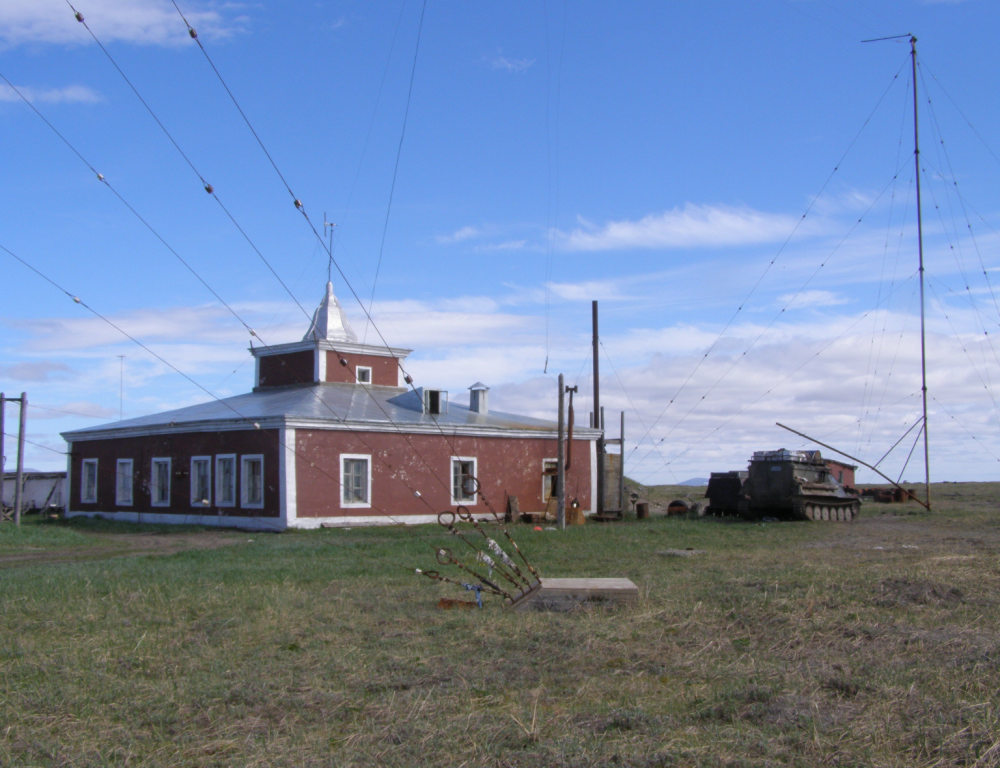
An unusually low lighthouse on the tip of the Russkaya Koshka

Archaeological excavations performed near Lake Elgygytgyn revealed that Chukotka was populated by humans during the Early Neolithic period, where a Stone Age encampment has been uncovered. The existence of a viable human population has been confirmed by further excavations near Lake Chirovoye, although the most impressive findings in the district have been found at Ust-Belaya, as the area in the vicinity of the settlement was also populated during Neolithic times, and a toggled harpoon head found in a grave indicated that there was a viable walrus hunting economy present in the area around 3000 BCE. Evidence of a hunter-gatherer type of people has been revealed, surviving from reindeer hunting and fishing.

Around 2000 BCE, the first genuine Chukotkan culture began to emerge on the territory of what is now Anadyrsky District. The people who had previously existed solely on the tundra, gravitated towards new settlements on the riverbanks of the Kanchalan River, near the present site of the selo of Kanchalan, from where the culture gets its name. These people no longer relied on hunting for survival, but combined this with fishing. The fishing eventually developed into open sea hunting for whales and walruses, whilst those who still lived off the land began to tame the wild reindeer they hunted to form ever larger herds. The economy of the region was driven mainly by these activities until the 17th century.

=== 17th–19th centuries ===
By the mid-17th century, Russian forts had begun to appear in the Far East, but they had not yet settled in the area known today as Chukotka. At this time, an exploratory team including the Cossack Semyon Dezhnyov left the ostrog (fort) of Nizhnekolymsky, a settlement which still survives near Chersky in the present-day Sakha Republic, in search of furs and silver. Having met with almost total destruction as they rounded Cape Chukotsky Nos, a cape that would later bear Dezhnyov's name, when all but Dezhnyov's own ship were lost, he eventually found his way into the Anadyrsky Liman, followed the river upstream, and founded a camp which was the first Russian-speaking settlement in the region. This camp was the basis for the creation of Anadyrsk, an ostrog which would become a key element in the Russification of the region. Once Dezhnyov and his men were settled in the area, their quest for wealth drove their search for new walrus breeding grounds. A huge ground was found at the mouth of the Anadyr River. Within only a few years men under the leadership of Dezhnyov killed the entire population of the Anadyrsky Liman

With the discovery of Kamchatka at the end of the 17th century, Anadyrsk's importance as an administrative and economic hub grew still further. The fort itself had expanded as well with the foundation of several villages including Markovo.

Throughout the first half of the 18th century, relations with the local indigenous peoples were tense. Trade did take place, but the Chukchi were unwilling to submit to Russians and pay them protection money. By the mid-18th century, a viable sea route to Kamchatka had been discovered and Anadyrsk consequently lost its importance as a regional hub, with Catherine the Great ordering its demolition in 1766.

At the beginning of the 19th century, the Russian-American Company was founded and established a united trading base for a number of enterprises. Although there were still skirmishes with the local population, this attempt proved more successful and the Russians were able to make use again of the area around the former fort of Anadyrsk. In 1888, Markovo was made the administrative center of the district. At the same time, a Russian-American Company employee named Pyotr Baranov established a small trading base on the site of present-day Anadyr.

=== Modern history ===
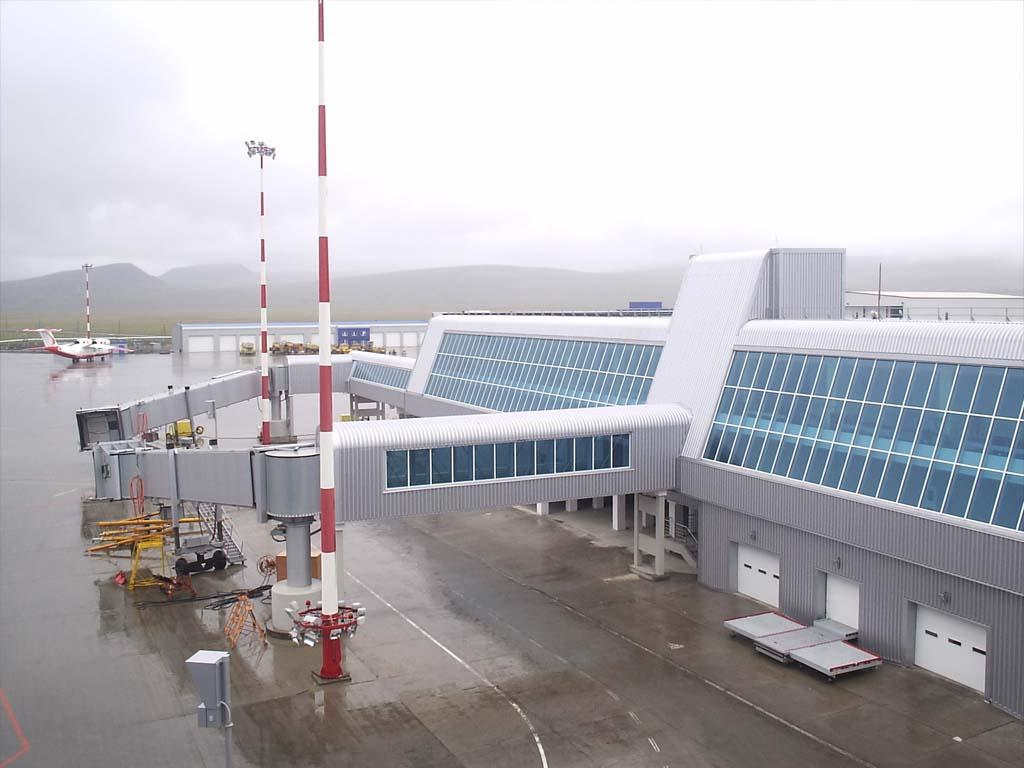
Anadyr Ugolnye Airport, August 2006

Exploitation of the various minerals to be found in the district did not begin until the early 20th century, when the Russian North-Eastern Siberian Society, an American conglomerate, began to extract gold and ship it back to the United States, though this enterprise ceased in 1912.

Due to the distance between Anadyrsky District and Moscow, news of the October Revolution took nearly a month to arrive and even when it did, Bolshevik politics did not immediately seize control. When Bolshevik partisans finally seized control of Anadyr in December 1919, they were overthrown by the kulak merchants soon after being established; perhaps not surprisingly since they were the only three Bolsheviks in the area.

It was not until 1923 that the revolutionary committee had removed all opposition, but the revolution had created serious economic problems, with the private companies that previously managed all of the fishing and general trade no longer in existence. To deal with the situation, the Hudson's Bay Company was contracted to manage the fishing, but the company failed to fulfill its contract.

In 1930, coal mining began in the Ugol Bay, which led to the founding of Ugolnye Kopi and the construction of port infrastructure began in Anadyr to streamline its transportation.

During World War II, an airport was established in Markovo as a part of the Uelkal–Krasnoyarsk route. This airport is still in existence and is served by Chukotavia. It is an important facility today, since it was built to accommodate large planes it is still a significant element in the district's underdeveloped transport infrastructure.

Both before and after the war, the private reindeer herds that had been developing since the second millennium began to be collectivized. From the 1960s to the 1990s, the economy in Chukotka grew. However, following the dissolution of the Soviet Union, the economy suffered badly and is only recently beginning to recover.

Until June 2011, the administrative center of the district was the urban-type settlement of Ugolnye Kopi.

=== Mergers ===
Before May 2008, Anadyrsky Administrative District was municipally incorporated as Anadyrsky Municipal District. In May 2008, Anadyrsky and Beringovsky Municipal Districts were merged, forming an enlarged Tsentralny Municipal District. This change, however, did not affect the administrative aspect of these districts. Both Anadyrsky and Beringovsky Administrative Districts continued to exist separately. In October 2008, the law mandating the change was amended and the name Tsentralny was discarded with the combined municipal district being renamed Anadyrsky Municipal District.

Beringovsky Administrative District was merged into Anadyrsky Administrative District effective June 13, 2011. At the same time, the administrative center of Anadyrsky Administrative District was moved from Ugolnye Kopi to Anadyr.

== Administrative and municipal status ==
Within the framework of administrative divisions, Anadyrsky District is one of the six in the autonomous okrug. The town of Anadyr serves as its administrative center, despite being incorporated separately as a town of okrug significance—an administrative unit with the status equal to that of the districts. The district does not have any lower-level administrative divisions and has administrative jurisdiction over four urban-type settlements and eleven rural localities.

As a municipal division, the district is incorporated as Anadyrsky Municipal District and is divided into two urban settlements and ten rural settlements. The town of okrug significance of Anadyr is incorporated separately from the district as Anadyr Urban Okrug.

=== Inhabited localities ===
Municipal composition
Urban settlements	Population	Male	Female	Inhabited localities in jurisdiction
Beringovsky (Беринговский)	1401	711 (50.7%)	690 (49.3%)	urban-type settlement of Beringovsky
Ugolnye Kopi (Угольные Копи)	3368	1776 (52.7%)	1592 (47.3%)	urban-type settlement of Ugolnye Kopi
Rural settlements	Population	Male	Female	Rural localities in jurisdiction*
Alkatvaam (Алькатваам)	299	158 (52.8%)	144 (47.2%)	**selo of Alkatvaam**
Chuvanskoye (Чуванское)	209	112 (53.6%)	97 (46.4%)	**selo of Chuvanskoye**
Kanchalan (Канчалан)	629	313 (49.8%)	316 (50.2%)	**selo of Kanchalan**
Khatyrka (Хатырка)	377	191 (50.7%)	186 (49.3%)	**selo of Khatyrka**
Lamutskoye (Ламутское)	173	98 (56.6%)	75 (43.4%)	**selo of Lamutskoye**
Markovo (Марково)	809	403 (49.8%)	406 (50.2%)	**selo of Markovo**
Meynypilgyno (Мейныпильгыно)	424	189 (44.6%)	235 (55.4%)	**selo of Meynypilgyno**
Snezhnoye (Снежное)	311	156 (50.2%)	155 (49.8%)	**selo of Snezhnoye**
Ust-Belaya (Усть-Белая)	856	436 (50.9%)	420 (49.1%)	**selo of Ust-Belaya**
Vayegi (Ваеги)	497	252 (50.7%)	245 (49.3%)	**selo of Vayegi**
Inhabited localities in the inter-settlement territory
selo of Krasneno
Inhabited localities being liquidated
urban-type settlement of Otrozhny; urban-type settlement of Shakhtyorsky

Divisional source:
Population source:
Administrative centers are shown in bold

== Economy ==
=== Industrial and administrative ===
The economy is driven mainly by coal and gold mining, with JSC Ugolnaya Mine extracting between 270,000 and 310,000 tons of coal annually in 2001–2004. 272,000 tons were mined in 2004. Geological explorations have taken place in the Kanchalan River Basin (specifically in the Valunitsy gold field) and Arakveyem deposit on the banks of the Belaya River in the early part of the 21st century. Development of alluvial gold deposits has taken place in the foothills of the Belskiye Mountains, near Otrozhny, and near the source of the Mayn River. The mines near Otrozhny are run from the town of Anadyr. Together with its sister mine in Bystry, it produces about 10% of the total annual gold output of Chukotka. In addition to coal and gold industries, exploration has taken place in the Anadyrskaya lowlands for oil and gas deposits.

In 2005, Anadyrsky District had a working population of approximately 8,800 individuals. Of these approximately one in five worked in medium or large industry, one in four worked either for the government or the administration in some capacity, with health and fuel industries being the other main non-traditional sources of employment. In 2005, the fuel industry was where the highest salaries were to be found (paying over 10,000 rubles per month in 2002 at a time when basic living costs were approximately 7,000 rubles per month).

=== Traditional and cultural ===
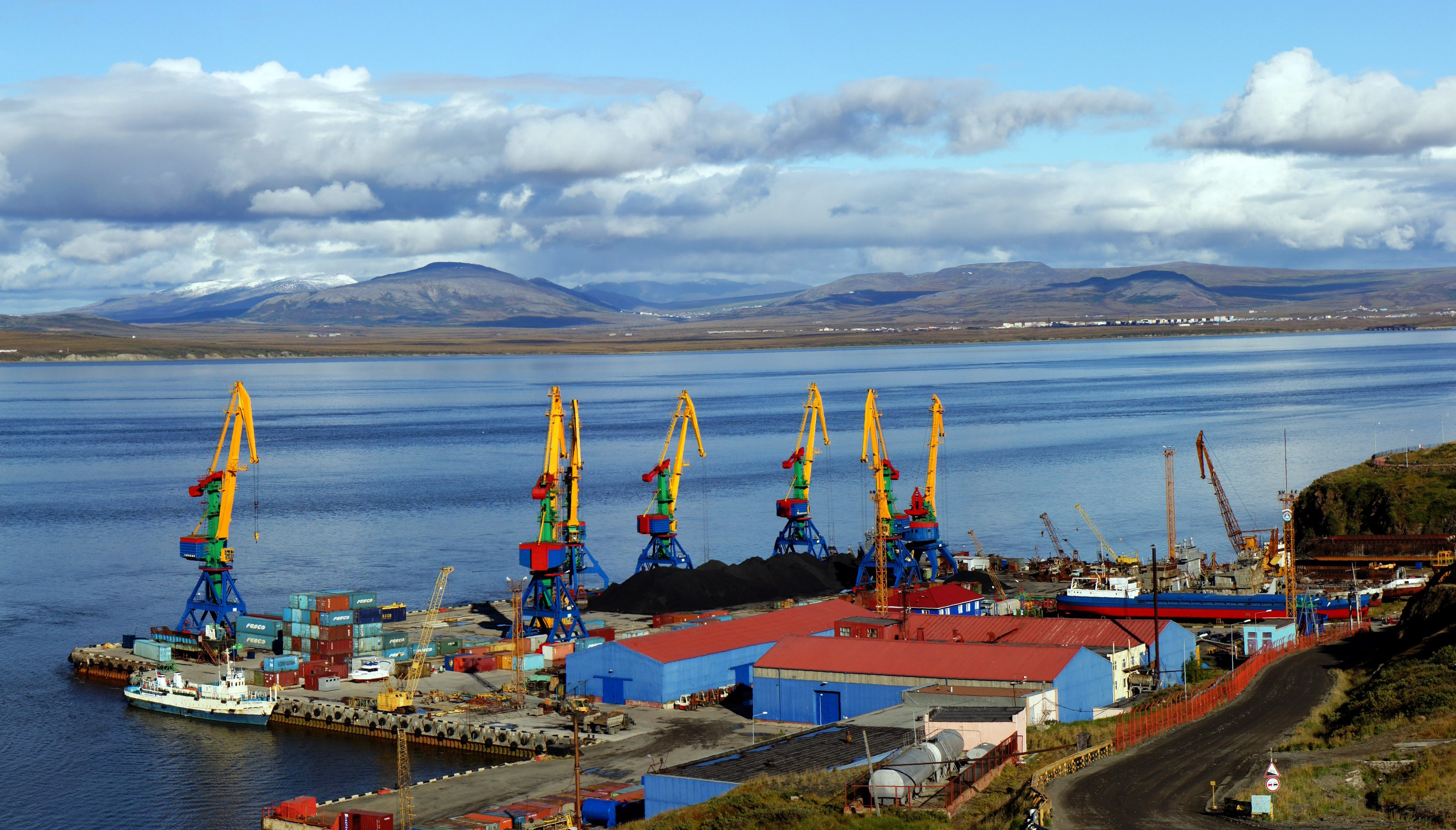
View of the Anadyr port

However, traditional economic drivers are still present, with reindeer farming being responsible for nearly 50,000 animals. Four agricultural farms are operating in the district: Markovsky Farm (in Markovo), Kanchalansky Farm (in Kanchalan), Vayezhsky Farm (in Vayegi), and the First Revkom of Chukotka Farm (in Snezhnoye). There is also a reindeer farm at Ust-Belaya.

In addition to reindeer farming, the traditional economic activity of the Chukchi people, there is a significant harvest of Chum salmon, with 500 tons being caught annually within the district in the 1990s in addition to a further harvest of 250 tons of other species. However, due to the economic collapse following the dissolution of the Soviet Union, the main fish processing plant in Anadyr, which contained a number of factories for the packing and processing of fish and caviar was forced to close.

In 2002, approximately one in three people were employed in the agricultural sector, in education, or in cultural positions. The agricultural sector was at the time the lowest paying sector in the economy of the district, with the average 2002 wage providing less than half the required monthly cash needed for basic living costs and only slightly more than required for minimum food costs. Although raising livestock is not a common activity in Chukotka, some people in Anadyrsky district keep small herds of Yakut horses. While it was cost effective, the farming sovkhoz in Anadyrsky district used to raise birds.

=== Transportation ===
The major airport for the district is the Ugolny Airport, providing vital links to all airports within the district with Chukotavia as well as Alaska through Bering Air, Khabarovsk with Vladivostok Air, and Moscow with Transaero Airlines.

There is also a sea port in Anadyr and barges navigate upstream during the summer months.

== Climate ==
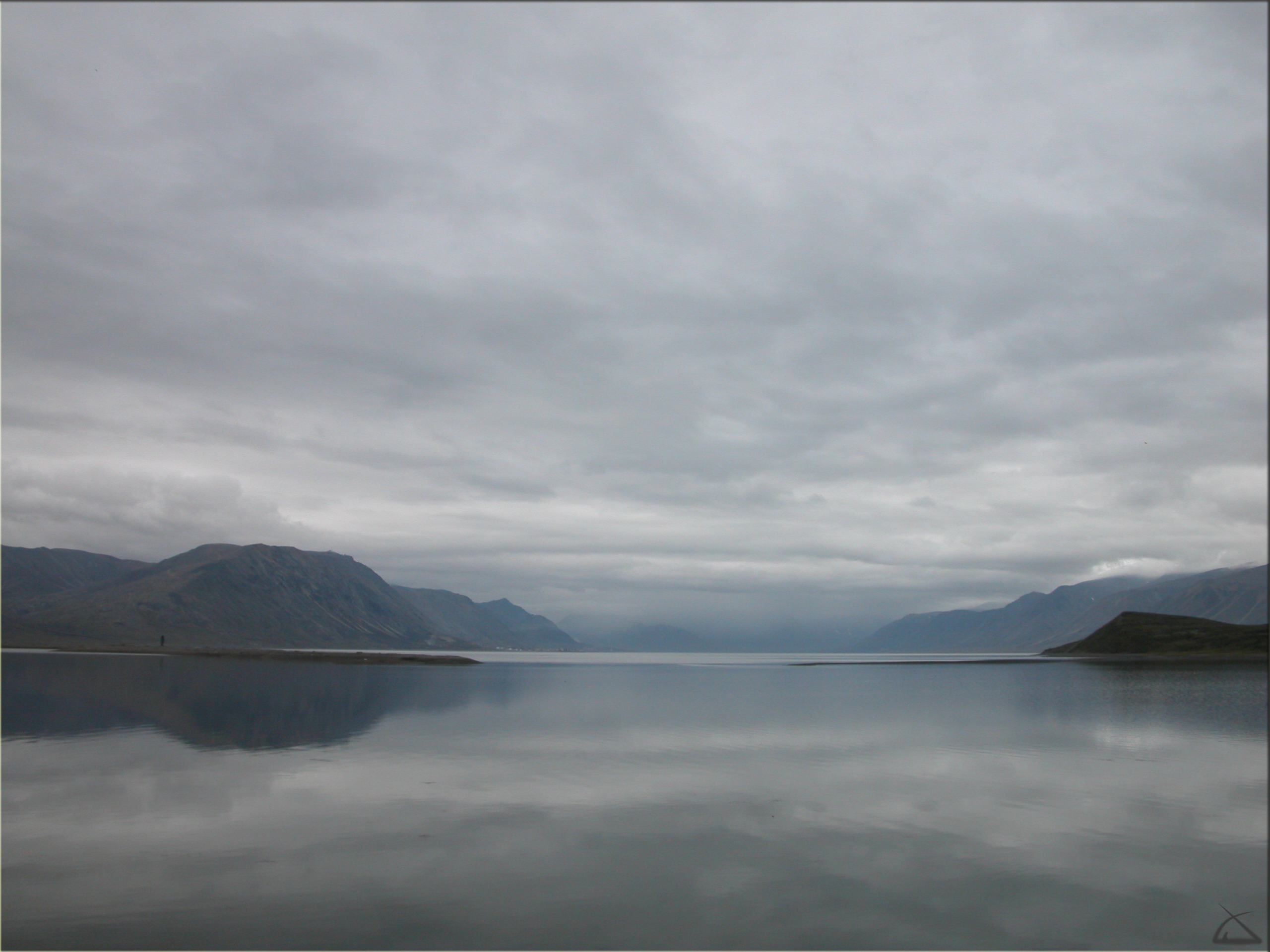
View across Anadyrsky Liman on a foggy day

Average coastal temperatures are between −4.9 and −9.1 °C (23.2 and 15.6 °F) though inland temperatures are often colder. For example, average high temperatures in Markovo from October through to May are below freezing, with only a brief summer period between June and August where temperatures reach double figures. Rainfall of approximately 3–500 mm occurs in lowland areas, 600 millimeters (24 in) in more mountainous areas, and 700 millimeters (28 in) in the Koryak Highlands in the south of the district. Permanent snow can be found across the district from about October and the area generally receives up to 1 meter (3 ft 3 in) of snow per year.

There has been an increase in flooding in the area. This creates dangers to the environment due to the proximity to water of a number of large oil and gas plants, including open petroleum storage containers that could be washed into the ground or water supply. At the start of the 21st century, serious flooding in Anadyr itself resulted in significant damage to both public and private property, including serious power cuts. An unquantified amount of fuel was also washed into the sea as a result of this.

== Politics ==
=== Election results ===
The table below shows the results of the elections of deputies to the State Duma of the Russian Federation.

Parties/Year	2003	2007	2011
Communist Party	5.91%	3.73%	4.39%
Patriots of Russia (including former Party of Peace and Unity)	0.44%	0.53%	0.60%
A Just Russia (including former Rodina or Motherland-National Patriotic Union Russian Party of Life People's Party of the Russian Federation and Russian Ecological Party "The Greens")	12.20%	3.80%	5.01%
Yabloko (including former Union of People for Education and Research)	3.40%	1.08%	1.66%
Right Cause (including former Citizens' Force Democratic Party of Russia and Union of Rightist Forces)	3.27%	0.34%	0.70%
United Russia (including former Agrarian Party of Russia)	53.12%	74.5%	72.44%
Liberal Democratic Party	12.59%	12.19%	12.97%
Other minor parties	7.94%	3.83%	xx%

2011 Source:
2007 Source:
