= Lamutskoye =

Lamutskoye Ламутское
- Selo
- Interactive map of Lamutskoye
- Location of Lamutskoye Lamutskoye (Chukotka Autonomous Okrug)
- Coordinates: 65°32′N 168°50′E
- Country: Russia
- Federal subject: Chukotka Autonomous Okrug
- Administrative district: Anadyrsky District
- Founded: 1936 or 1940

Area
  - Total: 2 km^{2} (0.77 sq mi)

Population (2010 Census)
  - Total: 173
  - Estimate (January 2018): 138 (−20.2%)
  - Density: 86/km^{2} (220/sq mi)

Municipal status
  - Municipal district: Anadyrsky Municipal District
  - Rural settlement: Lamutskoye Rural Settlement
  - Capital of: Lamutskoye Rural Settlement
- Time zone: UTC+12 (MSK+9)
- Postal code: 689533
- Dialing code: +7 42732
- OKTMO ID: 77603428101

Lamutskoye (Russian: Ламутское) is a rural locality (a selo) in Anadyrsky District of Chukotka Autonomous Okrug, Russia, located northwest of Markovo and 10 kilometers (6.2 mi) northeast of Chuvanskoye on the middle reaches of the Anadyr River. As of the 2010 Census, its population was 173.

== Name and geography ==
The name of Lamutskoye is derived from the word Lamut—an archaic name for the Evens (the dominant indigenous people in the area who migrated to western Chukotka from what is now the Sakha Republic of Russia). It stands in the upper reaches of the Anadyr River, near the mouth of the Bolshoy Peledon River.

== History ==
Founded in 1936 (or, according to other sources, in 1940) as a collective farm, Lamutskoye served as a central hub for the Lamutsko-Yablonskaya nomadic reindeer breeders group, consisting of only eight itinerant families. In 1960, along with Chuvanskoye and Markovo, the farm was merged to form the Markovsky State Farm.

After the dissolution of the Soviet Union in 1991, small localities like Lamutskoye were extremely hard hit. In 2000, the monthly living wage across Chukotka was estimated at 3,800 rubles; however, the average wage in Lamutskoye was a meager 50–100 rubles.

== Administrative and municipal status ==
Within the framework of administrative divisions, Lamutskoye is subordinated to Anadyrsky District. Within the framework of municipal divisions, Lamutskoye is a part of Lamutskoye Rural Settlement within Anadyrsky Municipal District.

== Culture and infrastructure ==
Lamutskoye is the starting point for the Ryilet festivities—the longest reindeer race in the world held each year over a 90-kilometer (56 mi) course between Lamutskoye and Chuvanskoye—in which racers compete for the Governor's Cup.

Lamutskoye's infrastructure consists of a school, library, and the Palace of Culture, which conducts traditional feasts, races, and ceremonies connected with the reindeer herders.

== Demographics ==
As of 2010, the official census results showed a population of 173, of whom 98 were male and 75 female—a significant reduction from the 2006 estimate of 230 and the 2005 estimate of 213 (according to a report prepared for the Kupol gold project,). Of the 213 people living here in 2005, 212 were of indigenous origin. The ethnic composition of Lamutskoye's population is as follows:

Demographic Composition – 2005
Indigenous people	Number	Percentage
Chukchi	111	52%
Lamut	63	30%
Chuvan	28	13%
Evenk	6	2%
Yakut	5	2%
Russian	1	<1%
Total	213	100%

== Climate ==
Lamutskoye has a continental subarctic climate (Köppen climate classification Dfc) with bitterly cold, very long winters and short, very mild summers.

Climate data for Lamutskoye
Month	Jan	Feb	Mar	Apr	May	Jun	Jul	Aug	Sep	Oct	Nov	Dec	Year
Mean daily maximum °C (°F)	−23.3 (−9.9)	−23.8 (−10.8)	−19.7 (−3.5)	−10.2 (13.6)	2.7 (36.9)	16.1 (61.0)	19.4 (66.9)	15.5 (59.9)	7.4 (45.3)	−7.0 (19.4)	−19.6 (−3.3)	−24.7 (−12.5)	−5.6 (21.9)
Daily mean °C (°F)	−28.5 (−19.3)	−29.0 (−20.2)	−25.5 (−13.9)	−16.1 (3.0)	−1.9 (28.6)	9.8 (49.6)	13.0 (55.4)	9.6 (49.3)	2.1 (35.8)	−11.8 (10.8)	−24.6 (−12.3)	−29.8 (−21.6)	−11.1 (12.1)
Mean daily minimum °C (°F)	−33.6 (−28.5)	−34.1 (−29.4)	−31.3 (−24.3)	−22.0 (−7.6)	−6.5 (20.3)	3.6 (38.5)	6.6 (43.9)	3.7 (38.7)	−3.1 (26.4)	−16.6 (2.1)	−29.5 (−21.1)	−34.8 (−30.6)	−16.5 (2.4)
Average precipitation mm (inches)	27 (1.1)	17 (0.7)	13 (0.5)	14 (0.6)	12 (0.5)	28 (1.1)	48 (1.9)	50 (2.0)	28 (1.1)	23 (0.9)	30 (1.2)	24 (0.9)	314 (12.5)

== See also ==
- List of inhabited localities in Anadyrsky District
