= Anadyr =

Anadyr may refer to:

- Anadyr (town), a town and the administrative center of Chukotka Autonomous Okrug, Russia
- Anadyr District
- Anadyr Estuary
- Anadyr (river), a river in Chukotka Autonomous Okrug, Russia
- Anadyr Highlands
- Anadyr Lowlands
- Anadyr, a Russian steamship
- Operation Anadyr
- Gulf of Anadyr

== See also ==
- Anadyrsk, a Cossack fort and settlement on the Anadyr river, approx. 1650–1764
