= Ugolnye Kopi =

Ugolnye Kopi Угольные Копи
- Urban-type settlement
- Interactive map of Ugolnye Kopi
- Location of Ugolnye Kopi Ugolnye Kopi (Chukotka Autonomous Okrug)
- Coordinates: 64°44′00″N 177°42′00″E
- Country: Russia
- Federal subject: Chukotka Autonomous Okrug
- Administrative district: Anadyrsky District
- Founded: beginning of the 20th century

Government
  - Head of Administration: Pyotr Andrushchenko

Population (2010 Census)
  - Total: 3,368
  - Estimate (January 2018): 3,621 (+7.5%)

Municipal status
  - Municipal district: Anadyrsky Municipal District
  - Urban settlement: Ugolnye Kopi Urban Settlement
  - Capital of: Ugolnye Kopi Urban Settlement
- Time zone: UTC+12 (MSK+9)
- Postal codes: 689500, 689501, 689503, 689504, 689506, 689510
- Dialing code: +7 42722
- OKTMO ID: 77603157051

Ugolnye Kopi (Russian: У́гольные Ко́пи, lit. coal mines) is an urban locality (an urban-type settlement) in Anadyrsky District of Chukotka Autonomous Okrug, Russia, located east of Anadyr, the administrative center of the autonomous okrug, on the opposite side of the Anadyr River. It served as the administrative center of Anadyrsky District until June 2011. Population: 3,368 (2010 census); 3,863 (2002 census); 12,357 (1989 Soviet census), with an estimated population as of January 1, 2015 of 3,666.

It is a mainly mining town that also hosts the region's main airport.

== History ==
=== Pre-history ===
Traces of fossil flora and fauna dating to the late Cretaceous and Paleocene were discovered on the territory of modern Ugolnye Kopi in 2003, in the area known as the Golden Ridge, in the Ugolnoye and Pervomaysky fields. These areas exhibit extensive fossil flora and fauna composition; the fossilized plant remains are well-preserved. There are currently about 130 items in the Chukotka Heritage Museum in Anadyr. Pollen grains extracted from the shells show that for about two million years ago coniferous and deciduous forests existed on the Gold Ridge.

In the sediments of the Golden Ridge, fossil remains of teeth, vertebrae, and jaw fragments have been found.

=== Modern history ===
It was founded at the beginning of the 20th century to provide accommodation and facilities for those working in or administering the nearby mines, hence the name, and later to provide the same services to those working in the air industry at the local airport.

== Administrative and municipal status ==
Within the framework of administrative divisions, Ugolnye Kopi is directly subordinated to Anadyrsky District. As a municipal division, the urban-type settlement of Ugolnye Kopi is incorporated within Anadyrsky Municipal District as Ugolnye Kopi Urban Settlement.

== Demographics ==
Ugolnye Kopi is located on the road between the Ugolny Airport and Shakhtyorsky. Unlike a large number of localities in the region, Ugolnye Kopi's largest demographic are ethnic Russian. The Red Cross reports that only eighty-four people in Ugolnye Kopi are of indigenous origin; the remainder are of Slavic origin. This is as a result of the settlement's reason for existence being to provide accommodation and services to the local miners, servicemen, and aircraftmen, rather than it initially being an indigenous settlement that was turned into a collective farm such as, for example, Chuvanskoye.

== Economy ==
=== Infrastructure ===
The settlement houses all district institutions and several military units. There are various stores, a post-office, a library, a hostel for children, the District Center of Children's Art, a youth sports school, a daycare center, Chukotka Economic Lyceum, a high school, the Municipal Center of Education, and a cultural center.

=== Transportation ===
The settlement is also home to the main airport in the autonomous okrug, the Ugolny Airport. This is the main transport hub for the region offering vital links to all airports within the district with Chukotavia as well as Alaska through Bering Air. In summer, those arriving to the airport and heading to Anadyr may do so using a ferry crossing; however, winter arrivals need to use the ice road across the Anadyr River which leads straight into the town.

=== Energy ===
In 2003, power cables were finally laid across the water from the Anadyr power station to these settlements. The use of natural gas as basic fuel will allow for the considerable improvement of the ecological situation in the autonomous okrug by decreasing the level of emissions in the atmosphere caused by coal burning. Hence the cost of power will drop, and reliability and quality of power supply will be higher.

== Climate ==
Ugolnye Kopi has a polar climate (Köppen ET) because the warmest month has an average temperature between 0 and +10 °C (32 and 50 °F).

Climate data for Ugolnye Kopi
Month	Jan	Feb	Mar	Apr	May	Jun	Jul	Aug	Sep	Oct	Nov	Dec	Year
Record high °C (°F)	3.3 (37.9)	3.4 (38.1)	5.4 (41.7)	4.6 (40.3)	9.1 (48.4)	22.8 (73.0)	27.4 (81.3)	27.5 (81.5)	17.7 (63.9)	10.8 (51.4)	6.2 (43.2)	1.9 (35.4)	27.5 (81.5)
Mean daily maximum °C (°F)	−13 (9)	−14.5 (5.9)	−13.2 (8.2)	−7.7 (18.1)	0.3 (32.5)	7.9 (46.2)	12.6 (54.7)	11.8 (53.2)	6.4 (43.5)	−0.9 (30.4)	−8.1 (17.4)	−11.1 (12.0)	−2.3 (27.9)
Mean daily minimum °C (°F)	−16.7 (1.9)	−18 (0)	−16.8 (1.8)	−11.8 (10.8)	−2.9 (26.8)	2.6 (36.7)	6.9 (44.4)	6.9 (44.4)	2.2 (36.0)	−4.5 (23.9)	−11.8 (10.8)	−14.8 (5.4)	−6.6 (20.1)
Record low °C (°F)	−34.1 (−29.4)	−32.8 (−27.0)	−31 (−24)	−25 (−13)	−16.9 (1.6)	−3.4 (25.9)	0.4 (32.7)	0 (32)	−7.9 (17.8)	−21 (−6)	−27 (−17)	−32 (−26)	−34.1 (−29.4)
Average precipitation mm (inches)	57 (2.2)	39 (1.5)	24 (0.9)	27 (1.1)	27 (1.1)	27 (1.1)	39 (1.5)	60 (2.4)	60 (2.4)	54 (2.1)	66 (2.6)	63 (2.5)	543 (21.4)
Average snowy days	19	14	15	15	17	3	0	0	4	17	20	20	144

== See also ==
- List of inhabited localities in Anadyrsky District
