= Chuvanskoye =

Chuvanskoye Чуванское
- Selo
- Interactive map of Chuvanskoye
- Location of Chuvanskoye Chuvanskoye (Chukotka Autonomous Okrug)
- Coordinates: 65°13′N 167°58′E
- Country: Russia
- Federal subject: Chukotka Autonomous Okrug
- Administrative district: Anadyrsky District
- Founded: 1930

Population (2010 Census)
  - Total: 209
  - Estimate (January 2018): 175 (−16.3%)

Municipal status
  - Municipal district: Anadyrsky Municipal District
  - Rural settlement: Chuvanskoye Rural Settlement
  - Capital of: Chuvanskoye Rural Settlement
- Time zone: UTC+12 (MSK+9)
- Postal code: 689532
- Dialing code: +7 42732
- OKTMO ID: 77603465101

Chuvanskoye (Russian: Чуванское) is a rural locality (a selo) in Anadyrsky District of Chukotka Autonomous Okrug, Russia, located west of Markovo on the banks of the Yeropol river (a tributary of the Anadyr River meaning "place of the Yukaghir games"), about 780 km from the mouth of the Anadyr. Population: 209 (2010 census); with an estimated population as of 1 January 2015 of 188. Municipally, the village is incorporated as Chuvanskoye Rural Settlement.

== History ==
There are two theories regarding the origin of the name. The first states that Chuvanskoye is simply named after the Chuvans themselves, whereas the second theory suggests that the name is derived from an older tribe, the Cha'achen, who used to live in the area and were a Yukaghir tribe from which the Chukchi themselves eventually developed.

Chuvanskoye was founded in 1930 as a collective farm, which was reorganised in the 1940s as the Chuvanskoye Kolkhoz "Znamya Sovetov" (although other sources suggest the village was not formally established until 1951). In the 1960s the Kolkhoz was merged with the collective farm in Markovo and Lamutskoye to form the "Markovsky State Farm". As a result of the collapse of the Soviet Union, small villages like Chuvanskoye were extremely hard hit. In 2000, the monthly living wage across Chukotka was estimated at R.3,800 however, the average wage in Chuvanskoye was a meagre R.50–100.

== Demographics ==
Population 209 (2010 census); a significant reduction on a 2006 estimate of 290, though this represented an increase from 217 reported in 2005 for an environmental impact report for the Kupol gold project. Of the people living in the village in 2005, all of them were of indigenous origin. Chuvanskoye and the lands surrounding it are the main area of settlement in the autonomous okrug for the Chuvans ethnic group, a branch of the Yukaghir people, who lived near the Anadyr River. Almost all the men in the village spend most of their time in the Taiga with their reindeer herds.

The village has a school, library and house of culture.

== Climate ==
Chuvanskoye has a continental subarctic climate (Dfc). The village experiences extremely cold winters. Temperatures generally do not rise above freezing between the beginning of October and the following May and are generally below −20 °C between the beginning of November and the following February. The summer is short and mild with temperatures averaging above 10 °C in July only, although record temperatures over 30 °C have been recorded.

Climate data for Chuvanskoye
Month	Jan	Feb	Mar	Apr	May	Jun	Jul	Aug	Sep	Oct	Nov	Dec	Year
Mean daily maximum °C (°F)	−23.2 (−9.8)	−23.5 (−10.3)	−19.4 (−2.9)	−9.9 (14.2)	2.9 (37.2)	16.0 (60.8)	19.1 (66.4)	15.5 (59.9)	7.6 (45.7)	−6.6 (20.1)	−19.2 (−2.6)	−24.4 (−11.9)	−5.4 (22.2)
Daily mean °C (°F)	−28.2 (−18.8)	−28.4 (−19.1)	−25 (−13)	−15.7 (3.7)	−1.6 (29.1)	9.8 (49.6)	12.8 (55.0)	9.7 (49.5)	2.4 (36.3)	−11.3 (11.7)	−24 (−11)	−29.2 (−20.6)	−10.7 (12.7)
Mean daily minimum °C (°F)	−33.1 (−27.6)	−33.3 (−27.9)	−30.5 (−22.9)	−21.4 (−6.5)	−6.1 (21.0)	3.6 (38.5)	6.6 (43.9)	3.9 (39.0)	−2.7 (27.1)	−16.0 (3.2)	−28.8 (−19.8)	−34.0 (−29.2)	−16.0 (3.2)
Average precipitation mm (inches)	29 (1.1)	18 (0.7)	14 (0.6)	14 (0.6)	12 (0.5)	29 (1.1)	48 (1.9)	50 (2.0)	29 (1.1)	23 (0.9)	30 (1.2)	25 (1.0)	321 (12.7)

== See also ==
- List of inhabited localities in Anadyrsky District
