= Kanchalan =

Kanchalan Канчалан
- Selo
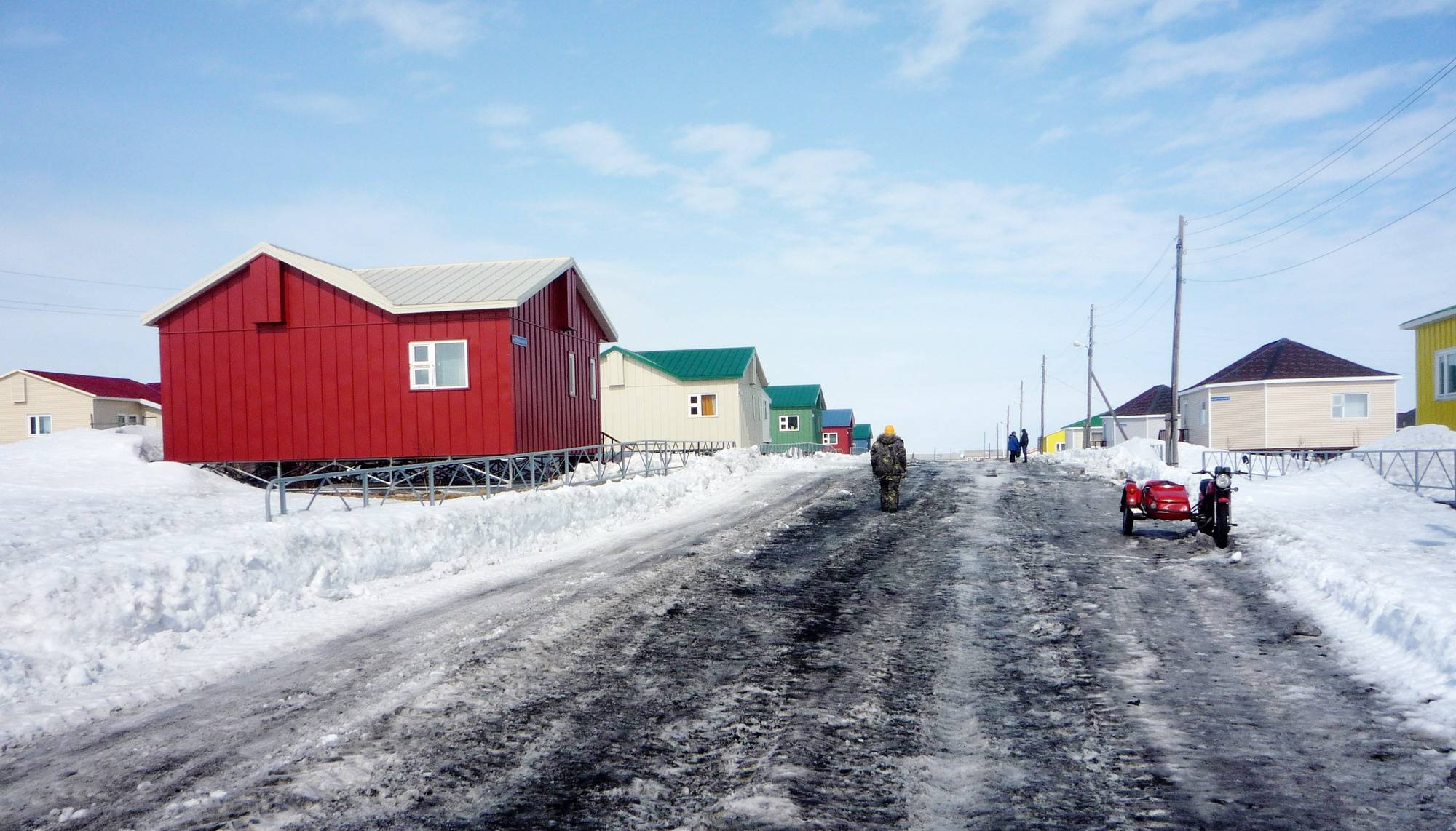
- Kanchalan in winter
- Interactive map of Kanchalan
- Location of Kanchalan Kanchalan (Chukotka Autonomous Okrug)
- Coordinates: 65°10′N 176°43′E
- Country: Russia
- Federal subject: Chukotka Autonomous Okrug
- Administrative district: Anadyrsky District
- Founded: 1952

Population (2010 Census)
  - Total: 629
  - Estimate (January 2018): 444 (−29.4%)

Municipal status
  - Municipal district: Anadyrsky Municipal District
  - Rural settlement: Kanchalan Rural Settlement
  - Capital of: Kanchalan Rural Settlement
- Time zone: UTC+12 (MSK+9)
- Postal code: 689514
- Dialing code: +7 42732
- OKTMO ID: 77603420101

Kanchalan (Russian: Канчала́н) is a rural locality (a selo) in Anadyrsky District of Chukotka Autonomous Okrug, Russia, located northwest of Anadyr, the administrative center of the autonomous okrug. As of the 2010 Census, its population was 629, with an estimated population as of 1 January 2015 of 525.

== Geography ==
Kanchalan is located on the banks of the Kanchalan, one of the three rivers which, together with the Anadyr and the Belaya, flows into the Bering Sea at the Gulf of Anadyr.

== History ==
The river Kanchalan, on the right bank of which Kanchalan stands, was shown as the Nerpichya on the 17th–18th century maps. The sedentary Chukchi people living in the vicinity were calling themselves konchalyt (lit. the onlies), that name, in the form of "Kanchalan", transferred first to the river and eventually to the inhabited locality.

Modern Kanchalan was founded in 1952.

== Administrative and municipal status ==
Within the framework of administrative divisions, Kanchalan is subordinated to Anadyrsky District. Within the framework of municipal divisions, Kanchalan is a part of Kanchalan Rural Settlement within Anadyrsky Municipal District.

== Economy ==
As with many of the rural localities throughout Chukotka, the population of Kanchalan is overwhelmingly indigenous (around 90%), mainly Chukchi. The main economic driver is reindeer herding, although there is also seasonal fishing near the mouth of the Gyrmekuul River. Residents maintain traditional methods of reindeer husbandry. Kanchalan's infrastructure includes a store, a communication center, a school, and a house of culture. In 2004, Kanchalan underwent a major repair project where all housing was repaired and 110 new houses built.

=== Transport ===
Kanchalan is not connected to the outside world by any road network.

== Demographics ==
As of the 2010 Census, Kanchalan's population was 629, In remained essentially flat for the past several years, with the 2003 estimate reported in the 2005 environmental impact report produced for the Kupol Gold Project being 635. Of that population, 540 were of indigenous origin.

== Religion ==
Kanchalan's religious facilities include a Russian Orthodox church dedicated to Saints Peter and Paul.

== Climate ==
Kanchalan has a continental subarctic climate (Dfc). It experiences extremely cold winters. Temperatures generally do not rise above freezing between the beginning of October and the following May and are generally below −20 °C (−4 °F) between the beginning of December and the following March. The summer is short and mild with temperatures averaging above +10 °C (50 °F) in July only, although record temperatures of nearly +30 °C (86 °F) have been recorded.

Climate data for Kanchalan
Month	Jan	Feb	Mar	Apr	May	Jun	Jul	Aug	Sep	Oct	Nov	Dec	Year
Mean daily maximum °C (°F)	−16.1 (3.0)	−19.7 (−3.5)	−17.0 (1.4)	−9.8 (14.4)	0.7 (33.3)	10.4 (50.7)	15.3 (59.5)	13.1 (55.6)	6.9 (44.4)	−3.8 (25.2)	−12.5 (9.5)	−17.8 (0.0)	−4.2 (24.5)
Daily mean °C (°F)	−20.5 (−4.9)	−23.7 (−10.7)	−21.2 (−6.2)	−14.1 (6.6)	−2.9 (26.8)	6.1 (43.0)	11.2 (52.2)	9.5 (49.1)	3.9 (39.0)	−6.7 (19.9)	−15.9 (3.4)	−21.6 (−6.9)	−8.0 (17.6)
Mean daily minimum °C (°F)	−24.9 (−12.8)	−27.6 (−17.7)	−25.3 (−13.5)	−18.4 (−1.1)	−6.5 (20.3)	1.9 (35.4)	7.1 (44.8)	6.0 (42.8)	0.9 (33.6)	−9.5 (14.9)	−19.3 (−2.7)	−25.4 (−13.7)	−11.7 (10.9)
Average precipitation mm (inches)	35 (1.4)	26 (1.0)	20 (0.8)	15 (0.6)	11 (0.4)	19 (0.7)	38 (1.5)	41 (1.6)	26 (1.0)	21 (0.8)	25 (1.0)	28 (1.1)	305 (11.9)

== See also ==
- List of inhabited localities in Anadyrsky District
