= Otrozhny =

Otrozhny (masculine), Otrozhnaya (feminine), or Otrozhnoye (neuter) is the name of several inhabited localities in Russia:

- Otrozhny, Chukotka Autonomous Okrug, an urban-type settlement in Chukotka Autonomous Okrug; in the process of being liquidated as of 2009
- Otrozhny, Orenburg Oblast, a rural locality (a settlement) in Orenburg Oblast
