= Krasneno =

Krasneno Краснено
- Selo
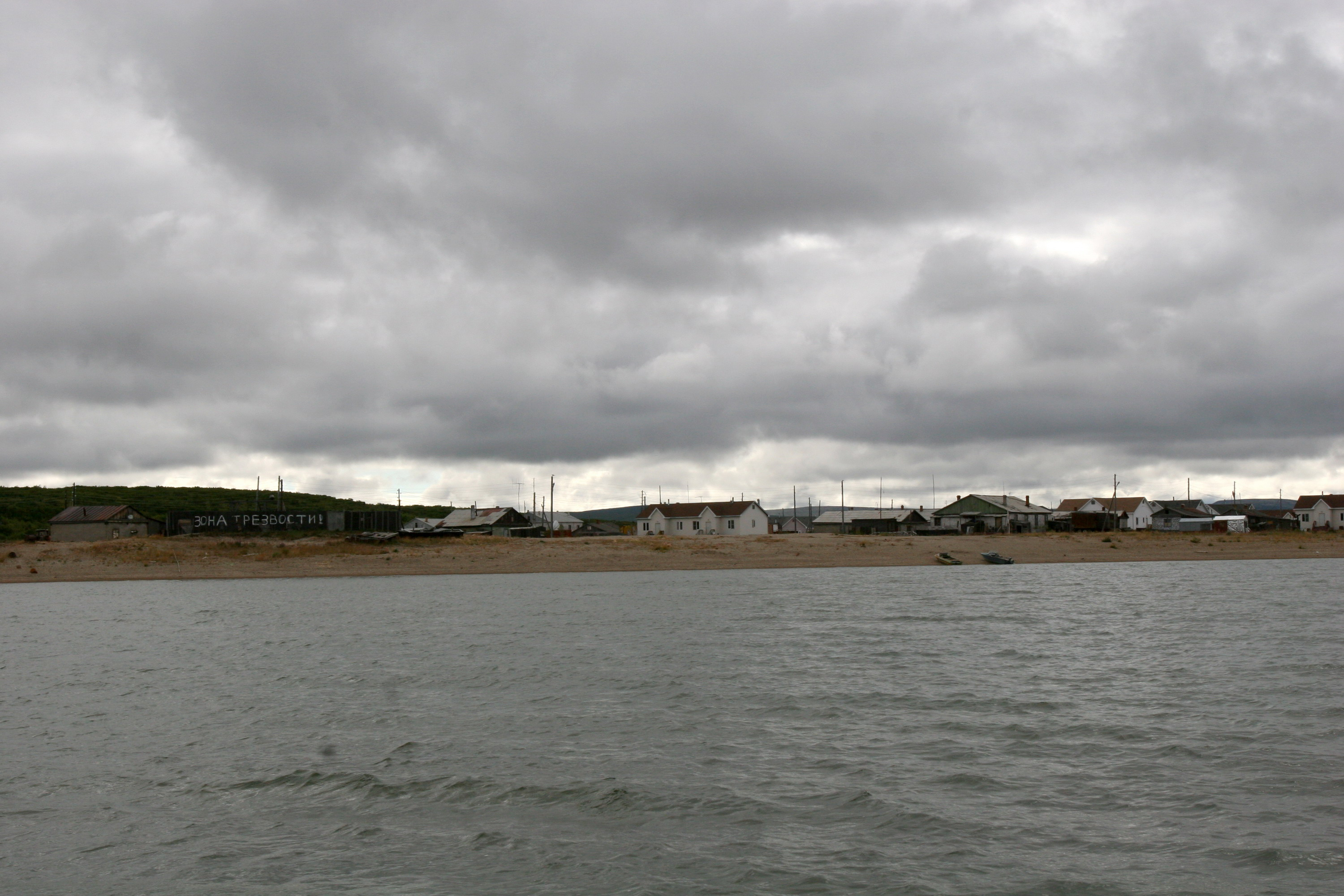
- View of Krasneno from Lake Krasnoye
- Interactive map of Krasneno
- Location of Krasneno Krasneno (Chukotka Autonomous Okrug)
- Coordinates: 64°38′N 174°48′E
- Country: Russia
- Federal subject: Chukotka Autonomous Okrug
- Administrative district: Anadyrsky District
- Founded: 1957

Area
  - Total: 0.24 km^{2} (0.093 sq mi)

Population
  - Estimate (January 2018): 63 )

Municipal status
  - Municipal district: Anadyrsky Municipal District
- Time zone: UTC+12 (MSK+9)
- Postal code: 689516
- Dialing code: +7 42732
- OKTMO ID: 77603701902

Krasneno (Russian: Кра́снено) is a rural locality (a selo) in Anadyrsky District of Chukotka Autonomous Okrug, Russia, located southwest of Anadyr, the administrative center of the autonomous okrug. As of 2016, its population was estimated to be 63.

== Etymology ==
Krasneno's name literally means "red", although old maps show the village as "Krasnyano", meaning rich or abundant in the Russian Old Believers' dialect, in reference to fish stocks nearby. Krasneno gets its name from Lake Krasnoye, on the shores of which it is located; the lake itself is named so due to being surrounded by red and brown rocks on its shoreline.

== History ==
It was founded in 1957. Historically, the area was known for abundant fishing, with Beluga whale and Ringed seal entering the lake from Anadyrsky Liman. Due to its proximity to the former Anadyrsk ostrog (fortress), the area was famous for trade fairs between Russians and Chukchi.

Around 2010, a number of houses were bought from Alaska as part of a refurbishment project.

== Administrative and municipal status ==
Within the framework of administrative divisions, Krasneno is subordinated to Anadyrsky District. Within the framework of municipal divisions, Krasneno is considered to be inter-settlement territory within Anadyrsky Municipal District. Until 2010, Krasneno was municipally incorporated as Krasneno Rural Settlement within Anadyrsky Municipal District.

== Economy ==
Krasneno has a general store, a primary school, a post office, and a cultural center. Local infrastructure has been assisted by the delivery from Alaska of several cottages around 2010. The economy is centered on traditional hunting and fishing, as the majority of the population is indigenous.

=== Transportation ===
Krasneno is not connected to the outside world by any road network.

== Demographics ==
The population as of January 2014 was estimated to be 70; down from the 2003 estimate of 118, as reported in the 2005 environmental impact report produced for the Kupol Gold Project, or of 95, as reported by the Red Cross. The population consists mainly of indigenous Chukchi, who make up around 90% of the population, though there is also a small number of Russians living there as well.

== Climate ==
Krasneno has a Continental Subarctic or Boreal (taiga) climates (Dfc).

Climate data for Krasneno
| Month | Jan | Feb | Mar | Apr | May | Jun | Jul | Aug | Sep | Oct | Nov | Dec | Year |
|---|---|---|---|---|---|---|---|---|---|---|---|---|---|
| Record high °C (°F) | 1.2 (34.2) | 2.2 (36.0) | 5.1 (41.2) | 5 (41) | 14 (57) | 26 (79) | 28 (82) | 25.6 (78.1) | 23.4 (74.1) | 10.8 (51.4) | 5 (41) | 3.6 (38.5) | 28 (82) |
| Mean daily maximum °C (°F) | −19.7 (−3.5) | −17.4 (0.7) | −14.5 (5.9) | −8.2 (17.2) | 2 (36) | 11.2 (52.2) | 15.8 (60.4) | 13.7 (56.7) | 7.9 (46.2) | −1.8 (28.8) | −8.9 (16.0) | −16.6 (2.1) | −3 (27) |
| Mean daily minimum °C (°F) | −26.6 (−15.9) | −24.6 (−12.3) | −21.8 (−7.2) | −15.7 (3.7) | −3.8 (25.2) | 3.8 (38.8) | 8.8 (47.8) | 7.5 (45.5) | 2.1 (35.8) | −7.1 (19.2) | −15.7 (3.7) | −23.4 (−10.1) | −9.7 (14.5) |
| Record low °C (°F) | −44 (−47) | −44.1 (−47.4) | −39 (−38) | −32.5 (−26.5) | −22.5 (−8.5) | −5.7 (21.7) | −12.1 (10.2) | −5 (23) | −10.4 (13.3) | −25.3 (−13.5) | −35.8 (−32.4) | −40 (−40) | −44.1 (−47.4) |
| Average rainfall mm (inches) | 41.7 (1.64) | 44.8 (1.76) | 32.7 (1.29) | 24.5 (0.96) | 16.1 (0.63) | 24.9 (0.98) | 42.2 (1.66) | 44.9 (1.77) | 37.1 (1.46) | 28.5 (1.12) | 38.7 (1.52) | 32.3 (1.27) | 408.4 (16.08) |
| Average snowy days | 12 | 14 | 13 | 15 | 14 | 1 | 0 | 0 | 3 | 16 | 18 | 15 | 124 |

== See also ==
- List of inhabited localities in Anadyrsky District
