= Ust-Belaya =

Ust-Belaya Усть-Белая Куулючьын (Chukchi)
- Selo
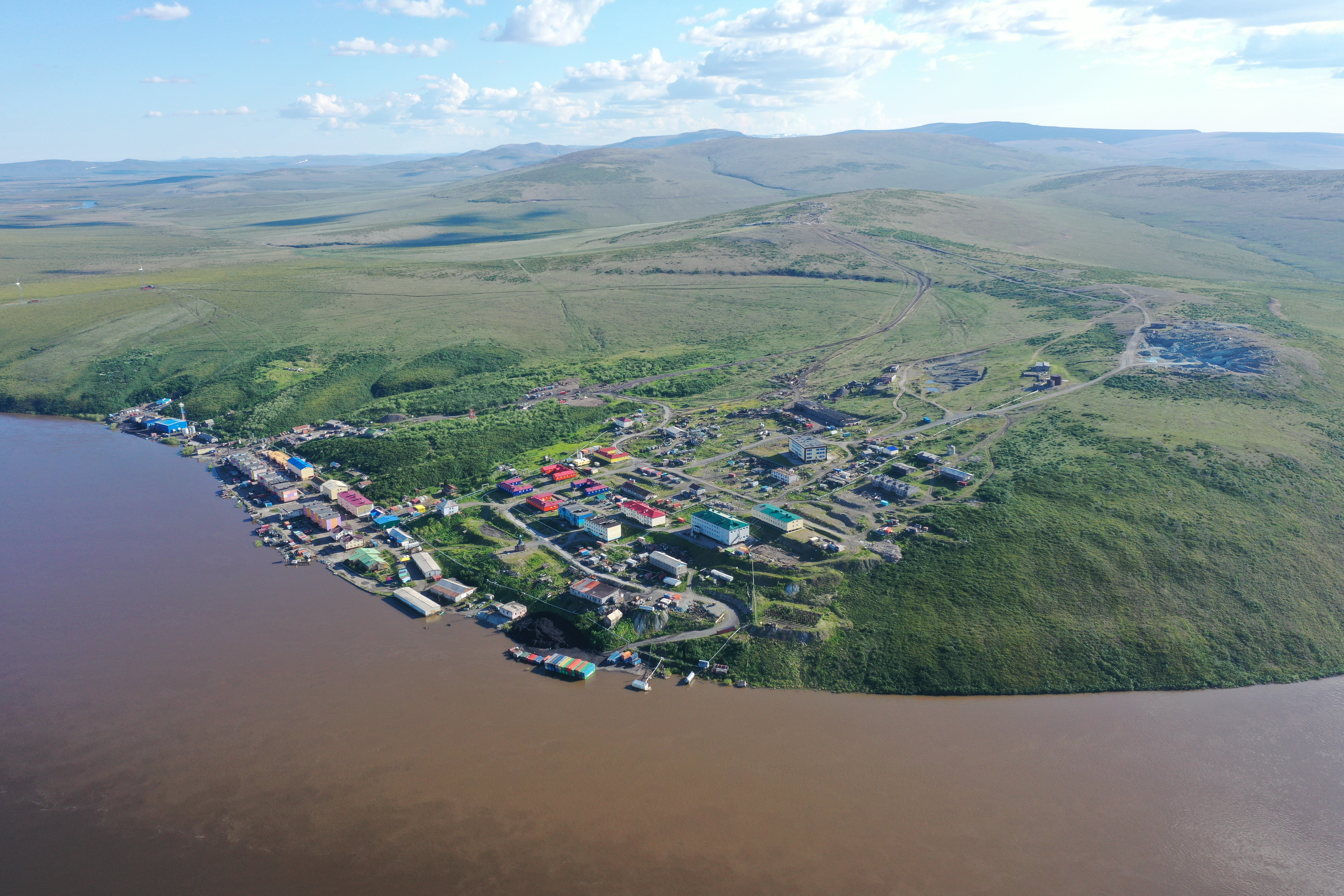
- Interactive map of Ust-Belaya
- Location of Ust-Belaya Ust-Belaya (Chukotka Autonomous Okrug)
- Coordinates: 65°29′N 173°17′E
- Country: Russia
- Federal subject: Chukotka Autonomous Okrug
- Administrative district: Anadyrsky District

Population (2010 Census)
  - Total: 856
  - Estimate (January 2018): 780 (−8.9%)

Municipal status
  - Municipal district: Anadyrsky Municipal District
  - Rural settlement: Ust-Belaya Rural Settlement
  - Capital of: Ust-Belaya Rural Settlement
- Time zone: UTC+12 (MSK+9)
- Postal code: 689540
- Dialing code: +7 42732
- OKTMO ID: 77603455101

Ust-Belaya (Russian: Усть-Бе́лая; Chukot: Куулючьын, Kuulûč’yn) is a rural locality (a selo) in Anadyrsky District of Chukotka Autonomous Okrug, Russia, located at the confluence of the Anadyr and the Belaya Rivers. Population: 856 (2010 census); Municipally, the settlement is subordinated to Anadyrsky Municipal District and incorporated as Ust-Belaya Rural Settlement.

== Geography ==
The settlement lies on the banks of the Belaya River (so called because of the contrast between its waters and those of the Anadyr), near to where it flows into the Anadyr River. The Parapol-Belsky Lowlands lie to the west and the Anadyr Lowlands to the east. The village is situated on the northern slopes of the mountain, Gynryretyk (Russian: Гынрырэтык, literally meaning "The Guardian").

== History ==
The area in the vicinity of the settlement was populated during neolithic times, and a toggled harpoon head found in a grave indicated that there was a viable walrus hunting economy present in the area around 3000 BCE. Furthermore, in the 1950s, the archeologist N.N. Dikov identified a burial site for a previously unknown people, who have been named after the village as the Ust-Belayan culture. Several Neolithic sites have been discovered in the vicinity of the village, on the banks of the river and at the eastern end of the settlement an ancient cemetery was partially destroyed during the construction of some warehouses.

The settlement was established by villagers from Markovo towards the end of the 19th or beginning of the 20th century, and is one of the oldest settlements in Chukotka. At the beginning of the twentieth century, V.Z. Niulin moved here from the village of Markovo with approximately twenty other families from other camps in the surrounding area. in 1927, Nikulin opened a school in the village and the following year established a hospital. In 1930, a collective farm was established in the village and named "The First Revolutionary Committee of Chukotka". For the next five years, Ust-Belaya was the administrative centre of Anadyrsky District. The village is located in the immediate area where famous Chukchi reindeer herder Tenevil lived and the main economic driver of the settlement is still traditional reindeer husbandry aided by the fact that more than two thirds of the population of the village are of indigenous origin.

Currently, Ust-Belaya has a secondary school, an arts school, kindergarten, post office, communications center, a shop, a bakery and a hotel. There is also a weather station called "Muhomornaya" and a small Orthodox chapel.

== Demographics ==
Population as of 2010 was 856, of whom 436 were male and 420 were female, a slight decrease on a 2005 estimate according to an environmental impact report prepared for the Kupol gold project, which placed the population at 869, down from 936, in 2003. Of the people living in the village in 2005, 685 were reported to be of indigenous origin.

== Climate ==
Ust-Belaya has a continental subarctic climate (Köppen climate classification Dfc) with very long, bitterly cold winters and very short, somewhat cool summers.

Climate data for Ust-Belaya
Month	Jan	Feb	Mar	Apr	May	Jun	Jul	Aug	Sep	Oct	Nov	Dec	Year
Mean daily maximum °C (°F)	−18.4 (−1.1)	−20.7 (−5.3)	−17.5 (0.5)	−9.6 (14.7)	1.8 (35.2)	13.3 (55.9)	17.2 (63.0)	14.3 (57.7)	7.3 (45.1)	−4.8 (23.4)	−15.1 (4.8)	−20.2 (−4.4)	−4.4 (24.1)
Daily mean °C (°F)	−23.4 (−10.1)	−25.5 (−13.9)	−22.7 (−8.9)	−14.9 (5.2)	−2.5 (27.5)	7.9 (46.2)	11.8 (53.2)	9.4 (48.9)	3.0 (37.4)	−8.9 (16.0)	−19.5 (−3.1)	−24.9 (−12.8)	−9.2 (15.5)
Mean daily minimum °C (°F)	−28.4 (−19.1)	−30.3 (−22.5)	−27.9 (−18.2)	−20.2 (−4.4)	−6.7 (19.9)	2.6 (36.7)	6.5 (43.7)	4.5 (40.1)	−1.2 (29.8)	−12.9 (8.8)	−23.8 (−10.8)	−29.5 (−21.1)	−13.9 (6.9)
Average precipitation mm (inches)	24 (0.9)	16 (0.6)	12 (0.5)	14 (0.6)	12 (0.5)	21 (0.8)	39 (1.5)	45 (1.8)	24 (0.9)	22 (0.9)	26 (1.0)	22 (0.9)	277 (10.9)

== See also ==
- List of inhabited localities in Anadyrsky District
