= Russkaya Koshka =

Spit in Chukotka, Russia

Coordinates: 64°34′00″N 178°33′00″E

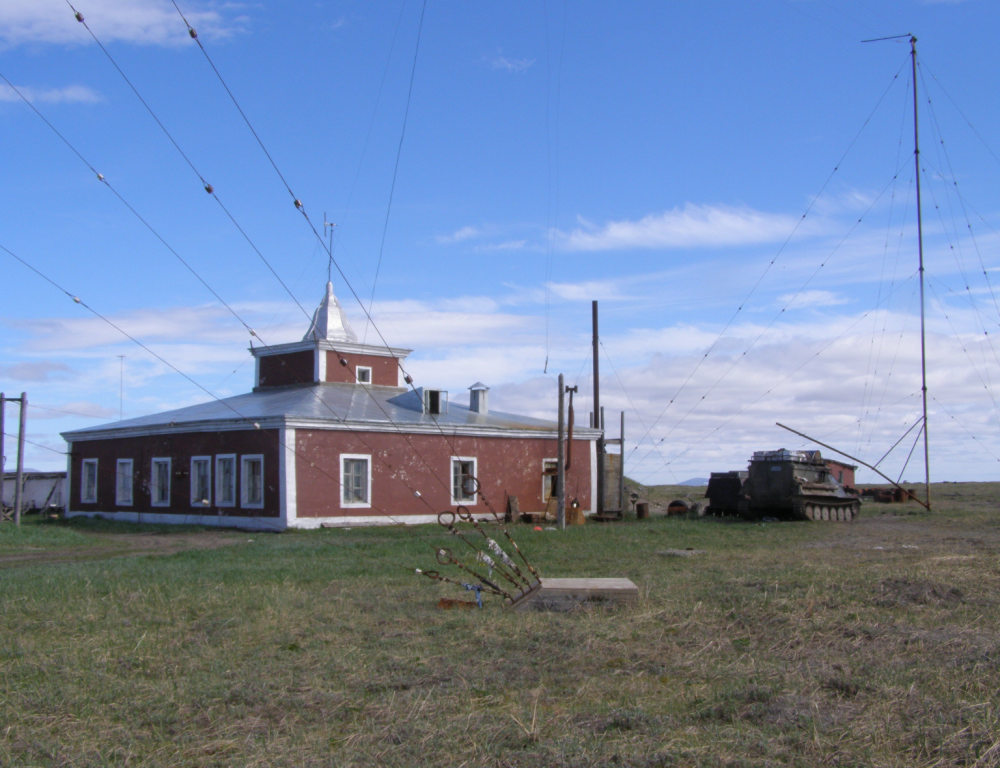
The lighthouse.

Russkaya Koshka (Russian: Русская Кошка) is a spit that divides the Anadyr Estuary from the Gulf of Anadyr. The name literally translates as "the Russian cat"; but in fact, koshka is the dialectal word for "sand spit". The spit is 16 km long and up to 2 km wide and has an average elevation of 3 to 4 meters. An unusually low lighthouse stands at the end of the spit. The southern tip of the spit is Cape St. Basil (or St. Basilius) in old sources. The bay between the spit and the mainland is (or was) called Klinkowstroem Bay, an arm of the Anadyr Estuary.
