= Otrozhny, Chukotka Autonomous Okrug =

Otrozhny Отрожный
- Selo (abolished)
- Interactive map of Otrozhny
- Location of Otrozhny Otrozhny (Chukotka Autonomous Okrug)
- Coordinates: 65°07′15″N 172°48′08″E
- Country: Russia
- Federal subject: Chukotka Autonomous Okrug
- Administrative district: Anadyrsky District
- Founded: 1964
- Abolished: 1998

Population
  - Estimate (2021): 0 )

Municipal status
  - Municipal district: Anadyrsky Municipal District
- Time zone: UTC+12 (MSK+9)
- OKTMO ID: 77603703902

Otrozhny (Russian: Отрожный) is an urban locality (an urban-type settlement) in Anadyrsky District of Chukotka Autonomous Okrug, Russia, located about 200 kilometers (120 mi) west of Anadyr. It is a former gold mining settlement.

== History ==
The settlement was established in 1964 following the discovery of gold in the area. As well as gold, the mine also extracted osmiridium (a rare alloy normally only found in conjunction with other platinum group metals), with reports stating that several hundred grams were extracted in 1977. The settlement was abandoned in 1998 when the extraction of gold was no longer economically viable and as of 2008 is in the process of being officially liquidated.

The mines were declared unprofitable and that there was no possibility of developing any other form of economy in 1999 and the settlement was closed along with a number of others in Chukotka. The Russian government guaranteed funds to transport non-working pensioners and the unemployed in liquidated settlements, including Otrozhny, from Chukotka to other parts of Russia. The Ministry of Railways was obliged to lease containers for the transportation of the migrants' goods to the Chukotkan administration and ensure that they were delivered to the various settlements.

== Climate ==
Otrozhny has a Continental Subarctic or Boreal (taiga) climates (Dfc). On average, the temperature is below freezing from the start of September through to the end of the following May, with average low temperatures of below minus twenty Celsius occurring between November and April. June, July and August are the only months where the temperature is above freezing on average. This short summer period is still cool however, with temperatures rarely rising above ten degrees, although, as can be seen in the table below, there are occasional instances of significant heat.

Climate data for Otrozhny
Month	Jan	Feb	Mar	Apr	May	Jun	Jul	Aug	Sep	Oct	Nov	Dec	Year
Record high °C (°F)	−0.8 (30.6)	5.7 (42.3)	12 (54)	8.1 (46.6)	19 (66)	32 (90)	33 (91)	27.9 (82.2)	18.2 (64.8)	10 (50)	16.3 (61.3)	1 (34)	33 (91)
Mean daily maximum °C (°F)	−19.7 (−3.5)	−20.4 (−4.7)	−16.8 (1.8)	−10 (14)	3.5 (38.3)	14.9 (58.8)	17.1 (62.8)	13.6 (56.5)	6.5 (43.7)	−6.1 (21.0)	−17.1 (1.2)	−20.6 (−5.1)	−4.6 (23.7)
Mean daily minimum °C (°F)	−24.3 (−11.7)	−26.9 (−16.4)	−26.1 (−15.0)	−20.6 (−5.1)	−5 (23)	4.1 (39.4)	7.2 (45.0)	4.5 (40.1)	−2.4 (27.7)	−12.5 (9.5)	−23.4 (−10.1)	−25.9 (−14.6)	−12.6 (9.3)
Record low °C (°F)	−55.1 (−67.2)	−52 (−62)	−49.9 (−57.8)	−43.2 (−45.8)	−28.9 (−20.0)	−5.6 (21.9)	−5.6 (21.9)	−7.2 (19.0)	−17 (1)	−37 (−35)	−46.7 (−52.1)	−50 (−58)	−55.1 (−67.2)
Average rainfall mm (inches)	15 (0.6)	12 (0.5)	6 (0.2)	15 (0.6)	9 (0.4)	27 (1.1)	54 (2.1)	36 (1.4)	18 (0.7)	18 (0.7)	15 (0.6)	12 (0.5)	237 (9.3)
Average snowy days	15	14	11	11	8	1	0	0	4	13	12	17	106

== See also ==
- List of inhabited localities in Anadyrsky District
