= Vtoraya Rechka =

Location
- Country: Russia

Physical characteristics
- Mouth: Bering Sea
  - location: Gulf of Anadyr
  - coordinates: 64.3936°N 177.5071°E
- Length: 81 km (50 mi)

The Vtoraya Rechka (Russian: Вторая Речка, literal translation: "second river") is a stream in Far East Russia. It is 81 kilometres (50 mi) long. It flows through a region of wetlands and tundra into the Bering Sea at the Anadyr Bay, close to the Tretya Rechka ("third river").

The Vtoraya Rechka and its tributaries belong to the Chukotka Autonomous Okrug administrative region of Russia.

Belugas are common in its waters.

The Vtoraya Rechka in Chukotka should not be confused with a smaller "Vtoraya Rechka" near Vladivostok.
