= Kanchalan (river) =

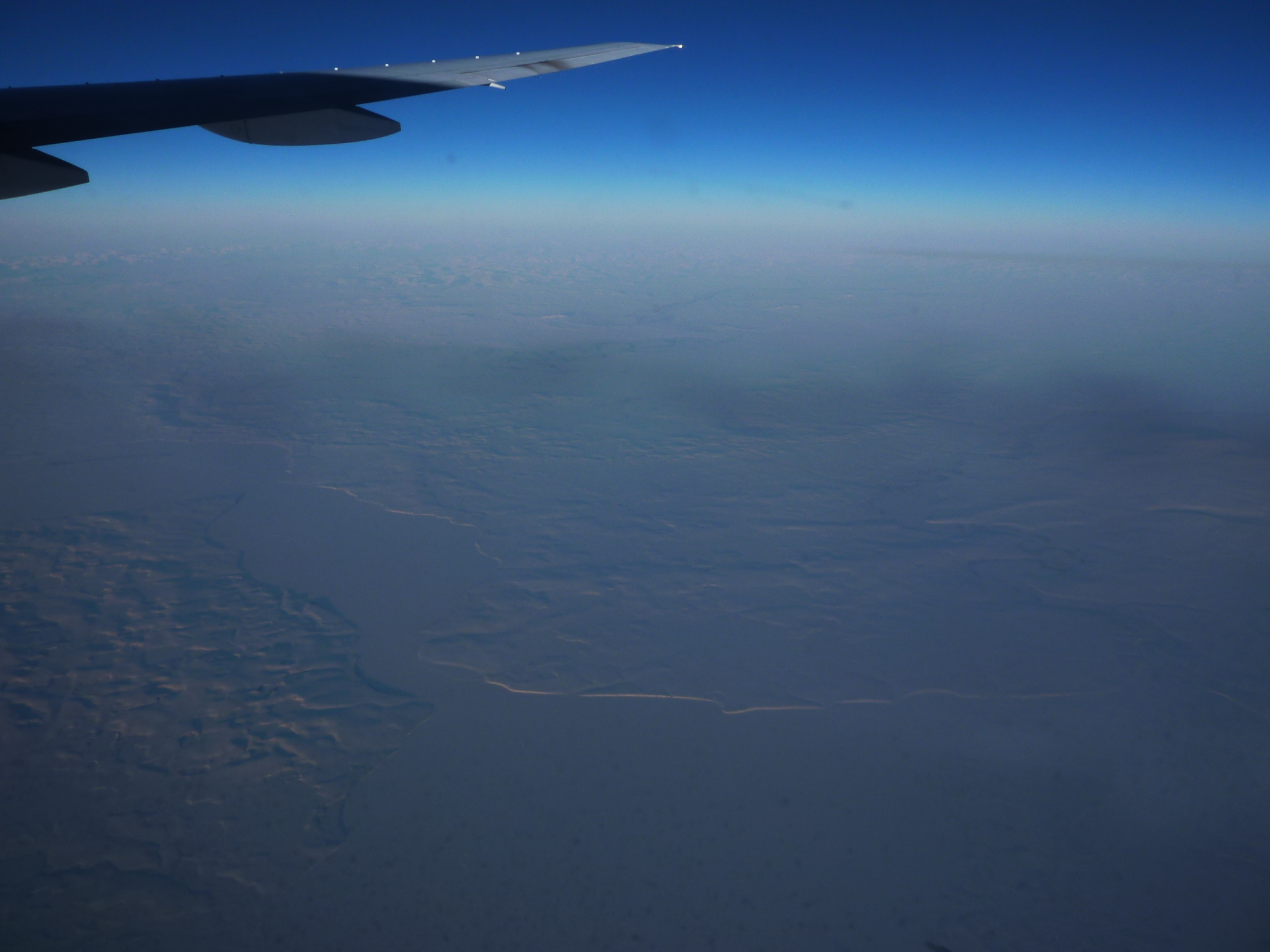
- The Kanchalan estuary (center left) opening into the Anadyr Estuary

- Mouth location in the Chukotka Autonomous Okrug, Russia

Location
- Country: Russia

Physical characteristics
- Mouth: Bering Sea
  - location: Anadyr Estuary
  - coordinates: 65.0573°N 176.4191°E
- Length: 426 km (265 mi)
- Basin size: 20,600 km^{2} (8,000 sq mi)

The Kanchalan (Russian: Канчалан) is a river in Chukotka Autonomous Okrug, Russian Far East. It is 426 kilometres (265 mi) long, and has a drainage basin of 20,600 square kilometres (8,000 sq mi).

== History ==
The Kanchalan and its tributaries belong to the Chukotka Autonomous Okrug administrative region of Russia. There is a small populated place in the area close to its estuary also called Kanchalan. Originally the river appears to have been called the Nyerpicha according to maps of the 17th and 18th centuries. A sedentary people who went on to form the eponymous settlement lived on its banks who called themselves "Konchalyt", (from the Chukchi кончальыт meaning Only) and over time their name became associated with both the settlement and the river itself. In Chukchi, the river is divided into two parts, the lower reaches are called Gytgomkyvaam (Гытгомкываам, lit. Bush River), whilst the upper reaches are called Tadlyeoan (Тадлеоан, lit. The Place of Vengeance) as this was the site of historical battles between the Chukchi, Yukaghirs and Koryaks.

== Course ==
Its sources are in the Tumannaya Mountain area of the Chukotka Mountains. The river flows roughly southwards through the sparsely populated areas of the Anadyr Lowlands. It meets the Bering Sea at the Gulf of Anadyr through the Anadyr Estuary.

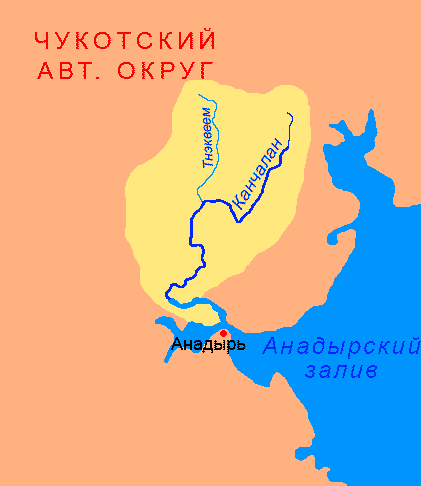
Map of the Kanchalan basin.

== Wildlife ==
Beluga whales are common in its estuarine waters.

== See also ==
- List of rivers of Russia
