= Markovo, Chukotka Autonomous Okrug =

Markovo Марково Уйвын / Гуйгун (Chukchi)
- Selo
- Interactive map of Markovo
- Location of Markovo Markovo (Chukotka Autonomous Okrug)
- Coordinates: 64°40′N 170°25′E
- Country: Russia
- Federal subject: Chukotka Autonomous Okrug
- Administrative district: Anadyrsky District
- Founded: 1649

Area
  - Total: 6 km^{2} (2.3 sq mi)

Population (2010 Census)
  - Total: 809
  - Estimate (January 2018): 578 (−28.6%)
  - Density: 130/km^{2} (350/sq mi)

Municipal status
  - Municipal district: Anadyrsky Municipal District
  - Rural settlement: Markovo Rural Settlement
  - Capital of: Markovo Rural Settlement
- Time zone: UTC+12 (MSK+9)
- Postal code: 689530
- Dialing code: +7 42732
- OKTMO ID: 77603430101

Markovo (Russian: Ма́рково; Chukchi: Уйвын / Гуйгун, Ujvyn / Gujgun, lit. wooden hut; Koryak: Вуйвын, Vujvәn, lit. big village) is a rural locality (a selo) in Anadyrsky District of Chukotka Autonomous Okrug, Russia, located near the head of small-boat navigation of the Anadyr River. As of the 2010 Census, its population was 809.

A small locality now—albeit still quite large by Chukotkan standards—Markovo had historically been an important trade hub during the early period of Cossack exploration.

== Geography ==
Markovo is situated in the middle reaches of the Anadyr River, the largest waterway in Chukotka, in a lowland region with a microclimate, surrounded by the Shchuchy Range in the north, the east ridge of the Pekulney Range in the east, the Penzhinsky Range in the south, and the Russkiye mountain range in the west. Within this lowland tundra zone, deciduous forest is located around the floodplain of the Anadyr River, although the tundra covers the majority of this environment with a great number of lakes, rivers, and swamps. Unlike many other areas in Chukotka, comparably warm and lengthy summers create favorable conditions for the growth of deciduous forests and vegetation. There is a diverse world of animals, birds, and insects to be found. The absence of permafrost near Markovo gives the inhabitants an opportunity to grow open field vegetable crops.

=== Climate ===
Markovo has a subarctic climate (Köppen climate classification Dfc), which is quite varied. Although it can be below freezing from September through to the end of May, and regularly below −20 °C (−4 °F) from November to April, the short summers running from June to August are usually quite temperate, with record temperatures achieved during these months which are some of the warmest in Chukotka Autonomous Okrug.

Average annual rainfall is 330–380 millimeters (13–15 in), exposing the area to floods; water levels can rise more than 5 meters (16 ft). High levels of flood in the 20th century (with the increases in water level of more than 4.5 meters (15 ft)) were recorded in 1964, 1966, 1989, 1997, and 1999. The biggest flood was in 1997 (533 centimeters (210 in)), when over 90% of Markovo's territory was flooded, although mandatory training prevented damage on the large scale. A hydrological station is located on the right bank of the Anadyr River in the upper part of Markovo.

Climate data for Markovo
Month	Jan	Feb	Mar	Apr	May	Jun	Jul	Aug	Sep	Oct	Nov	Dec	Year
Record high °C (°F)	5.2 (41.4)	3.9 (39.0)	5.0 (41.0)	7.8 (46.0)	23.6 (74.5)	32.4 (90.3)	33.3 (91.9)	28.9 (84.0)	22.2 (72.0)	15.0 (59.0)	7.2 (45.0)	10.0 (50.0)	33.3 (91.9)
Mean daily maximum °C (°F)	−21.8 (−7.2)	−20.6 (−5.1)	−16.6 (2.1)	−8.6 (16.5)	3.1 (37.6)	16.3 (61.3)	19.6 (67.3)	16.0 (60.8)	8.7 (47.7)	−4.3 (24.3)	−15 (5)	−21.1 (−6.0)	−3.9 (25.0)
Daily mean °C (°F)	−26.1 (−15.0)	−25.4 (−13.7)	−22.3 (−8.1)	−13.9 (7.0)	−0.8 (30.6)	11.1 (52.0)	14.3 (57.7)	10.8 (51.4)	3.9 (39.0)	−8.3 (17.1)	−19 (−2)	−25.3 (−13.5)	−8.6 (16.5)
Mean daily minimum °C (°F)	−31.3 (−24.3)	−30.8 (−23.4)	−28.4 (−19.1)	−20.3 (−4.5)	−5.5 (22.1)	5.0 (41.0)	8.3 (46.9)	5.4 (41.7)	−0.7 (30.7)	−12.5 (9.5)	−23.8 (−10.8)	−30.2 (−22.4)	−13.9 (7.0)
Record low °C (°F)	−59.5 (−75.1)	−57.9 (−72.2)	−54.8 (−66.6)	−43 (−45)	−34.3 (−29.7)	−6.5 (20.3)	−3.4 (25.9)	−7.2 (19.0)	−17.8 (0.0)	−38.9 (−38.0)	−51.7 (−61.1)	−53.9 (−65.0)	−59.5 (−75.1)
Average precipitation mm (inches)	30.7 (1.21)	21.2 (0.83)	19.9 (0.78)	18.8 (0.74)	17.2 (0.68)	29.3 (1.15)	45.1 (1.78)	57.6 (2.27)	37.5 (1.48)	34.6 (1.36)	39.6 (1.56)	29.0 (1.14)	380.5 (14.98)
Average precipitation days (≥ 0.1 mm)	15.9	14.2	16.0	12.8	12.9	13.6	12.4	14.5	15.0	16.4	18.9	16.5	179.1
Average relative humidity (%)	77.6	74.8	77.5	77.2	74.3	65.9	71.9	79.7	79.3	81.4	82.4	78.3	76.7
Mean monthly sunshine hours	26.4	109.0	203.1	267.0	277.5	303.0	282.1	198.4	135.0	103.9	46.5	9.3	1,961.2
Source: climatebase.ru

== History ==
The date of Markovo's foundation is not known, although it is believed to be one of the first Russian-speaking settlements in Chukotka. Some sources state that Markovo was established in 1649. It is known that the crew from Semyon Dezhnev's expedition wintered close to the site of modern Markovo and that Anadyrsk was founded around this area at a later date as a base for exploring Chukotka and potential routes to Kamchatka. The Cossacks were followed by others looking for business opportunities and those who did not wish to continue being serfs. It is thought that modern Markovo evolved in the mid-18th century and was named either after an early settler with the last name Markov or after local Saint Mark, who consecrated the spot on which Markovo was to be established.

In 1862, the construction of the first parochial school in Chukotka started in Markovo; the school opened in 1883. People from Markovo were the founders of Ust-Belaya around the beginning of the 20th century, also located along the banks of the Anadyr River. In the 20th century, Markovo was the cultural center of Markovsky District (which was split into Anadyrsky and Bilibinsky Districts in 1958). Markovo's cultural significance continues today, as it is home to the Markovskiye Vechyorki Chorus, who specialize in old Cossack songs.

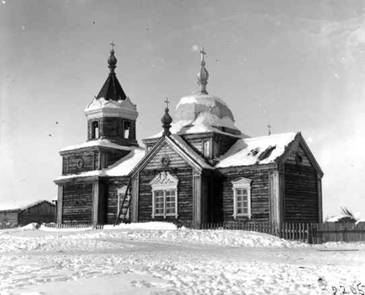
Russian Orthodox Church, Markovo, 1901

Markovo played a key role in the establishment of the Soviet rule in Chukotka in the early 20th century. When Soviet attempts to gain a foothold in the region were foiled in Anadyr, the revolutionary activities centered on Markovo. Mikhail Mandrikov and August Berzin were the first Bolsheviks sent to Anadyr by the Kamchatka Revkom to set up an underground organization to undermine and eventually overthrow the resident White Army forces. These two, along with a small group of other Russian immigrants and a handful of Chuvans, established the First Revolutionary Committee of Chukotka. Their presence initially went undetected, although it did arise suspicion. However, just before they were about to be discovered by the resident White Army troops, they launched an attack against them on the night of December 16, 1916, with the intention to free the local indigenous people from their debts to the Russian incomers and to begin the dismantling of the capitalist infrastructure. Their attempt at seizing the property of the merchant class in Anadyr was successful, although they failed to capture the armory and the ammunition supplies. The merchants used this opportunity to reassert themselves, and by January 30, 1920, they surrounded the Revkom offices and attacked. One of the leaders, Vasily Titov, was killed and a number of others were wounded. Mikhail Mandrikov himself surrendered. Although the survivors were initially imprisoned, the merchants decided to eliminate them permanently. Under the pretense of transferring them to another site, they executed them out in the tundra. The merchants' and White Army's success had been aided by the fact that a number of the Revkom members had been out the town visiting Markovo. When these people returned, they were ambushed and all survivors eventually killed. The merchants set about to re-establish the status quo, all the while pretending to be socialists when inquiries came from the Kamchatka Revkom as to the whereabouts of their colleagues, going as far as to set up a fake Anadyr branch of the Russian Communist Party of Bolsheviks. This scheme, however, did not succeed, as the members of the first Revkom had already managed to establish branches in Markovo and Ust-Belaya, so the Kamchatka Revkom sent a party to investigate. A number of those involved in the overthrow of the First Revolutionary Committee either ceased their political activity in the hope of blending into the background or fled Chukotka for Alaska. Struggles continued for some time after this, and it took until early 1923 before all White Army forces in Chukotka had been eliminated.

During World War II, an airfield was built here for the Alaska-Siberian (ALSIB) air route used to ferry American Lend-Lease aircraft to the Eastern Front.

In 1998, Markovo was demoted in status to that of a rural locality.

== Administrative and municipal status ==
Within the framework of administrative divisions, Markovo is subordinated to Anadyrsky District. Within the framework of municipal divisions, Markovo is a part of Markovo Rural Settlement within Anadyrsky Municipal District.

== Demographics ==
Markovo's size is comparatively large for Chukotka, with a population of 809 as of the 2010 Census, although it has been decreasing over the years: in June 2005, it was estimated to be 865, the 2003 estimate was 1,170, and the 1993 estimate was around 2,000.

In 2000, the ethnic groups in Markovo were as follows:

Demographic Composition – 2000
Indigenous People	Number	Percentage
Russian	625	58%
Chuvan	299	28%
Chukchi	62	6%
Evens	60	6%
Yukaghir	26	2%
Total	1072	100%

== Economics ==
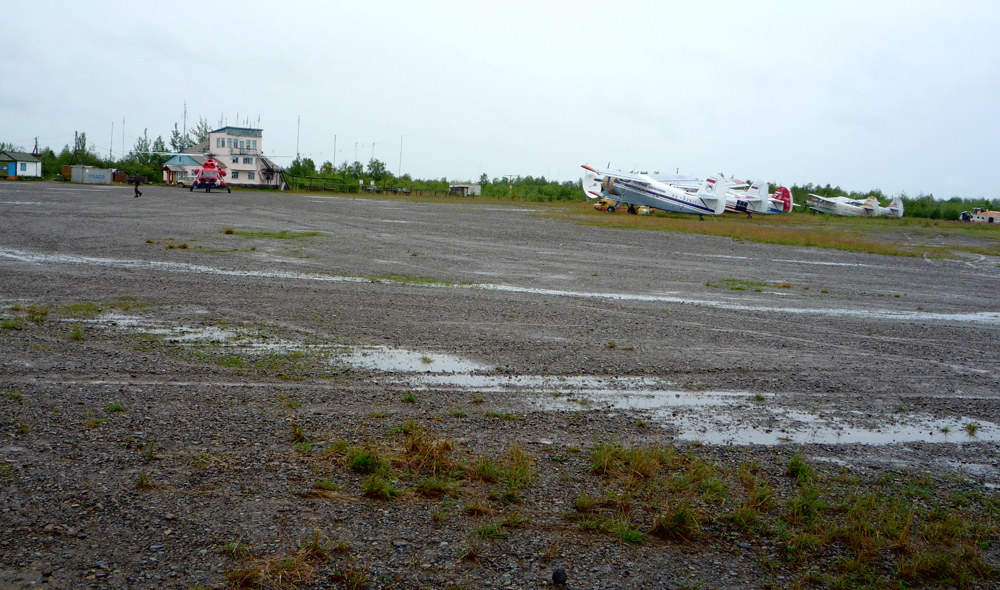
Markovo Airport

Of all the families in Markovo in 2000, regardless of ethnicity, only 5% had a regular monthly income, with most families living below the poverty line. The economy is driven mainly by subsistence reindeer herding and fishing—a result of the large proportion of indigenous people.

Markovo's infrastructure includes a boarding secondary school and a cultural center, with a new hospital being under construction in the 2000s.

=== Transportation ===
The Markovo Airport serves Markovo.

The depths of the Anadyr River allow ships with 600-ton lifting capacity to navigate all the way to Markovo, 517 kilometers (321 mi) from the mouth of the river, and boats with a draft of up to 1.5 meters (4 ft 11 in) and a carrying load of up to 150 tons travel on up the Anadyr River past this point.

== See also ==
- List of inhabited localities in Anadyrsky District
