= Chuvans =

Ethnic group

Total population
- 900 (2020 census)

Regions with significant populations
- Russia: 900

Languages
- Russian, Chukchi; formerly Chuvan

Religion
- Russian Orthodoxy

Related ethnic groups
- Yukaghir, Koryaks, Chukchi, Evens

Settlement of Chuvans in the Far Eastern Federal District by urban and rural settlements in%, 2010 census

Chuvans (Russian: чуванцы) are one of the forty or so "Indigenous small-numbered peoples of the North, Siberia and the Far East" recognized by the Russian government. Most Chuvans today live within Chukotka Autonomous Okrug in the far northeast of Russia. Based on first-hand field research by several ethnographers in the 1990s, people who self-identify as Chuvans seem to do so by living in small villages and in the tundra in areas that are primarily associated with reindeer herding.

== History ==
Historical accounts describe the Chuvans as a Yukaghir group. They roamed along the upper tributaries of the Anadyr River and Anyuy River in the 17th century. The Chuvans were engaged in hunting, fishing and reindeer-breeding. In the 18th century, some Chuvans retreated to the Kolyma River following attacks by the Chukchi. There, they gradually russified. The other part was assimilated by the Koryaks and Chukchis. According to the 2002 Russian Census, there were 1,087 Chuvans in Russia.

== Language ==
The Chuvan language, which was a Yukaghir language, became extinct by the early 1900s. Many Chuvans speak Chukchi in addition to Russian, and some have intermarried with the Chukchis. On the other hand, some, such as those living in the village of Markovo on the Anadyr River, neither herd reindeer nor are they able to speak Chukchi.

Ethnographic maps shows the Chuvans as the indigenous population of the Chuvanskoye village some 100 km west of Markovo.

== See also ==
- Chuvan Mountains
