= Anadyrsky Liman =

Anadyrsky Liman Анадырский Лиман
- Estuary
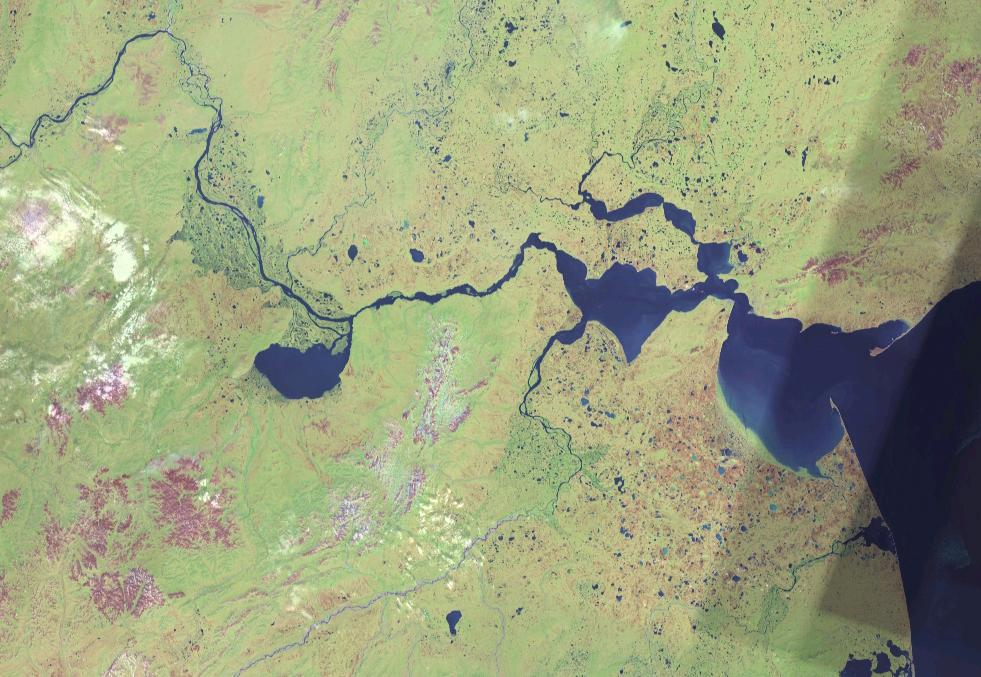
- The lower Anadyr showing the Anadyrskiy Liman, the sand bar, and tributaries. The Gulf of Anadyr is partially shown to the right

- Location within Chukotka Autonomous Okrug
- Coordinates: 64°29′51″N 178°23′29″E
- Country: Russian Federation
- Federal subject: Far Eastern Federal District
- Federal subject: Chukotka Autonomous Okrug

Anadyrsky Liman (Russian: Анадырский Лиман) or Anadyr Estuary is an estuary on the Gulf of Anadyr in Chukotka Autonomous Okrug, Siberia, Russian Federation.

== Geography ==
It is called a liman because it is separated from the Gulf of Anadyr by the Russkaya Koshka spit in the north and another spit (Geka Point) in the south. The channel into the Gulf of Anadyr through the bar is in the east. The Anadyr Lowlands are located to the west.

Anadyrsky Liman is divided into three parts. The outer bay receives the Tretya River (its mouth is the notch on the south shore). The southern part of the outer bay is shallow. The inner bay is called Onemen Bay and receives the Velikaya through a narrow bay on the southwest. They are separated by a promontory, with the town of Anadyr at its tip. North of the promontory is a series of lakes which form the mouth of the Kanchalan River. The Anadyr River enters the inner bay from the west. The lake south of the Anadyr in this image is Lake Krasnoye.
