= Gulf of Anadyr =

Gulf in Siberia

- Анадырский залив
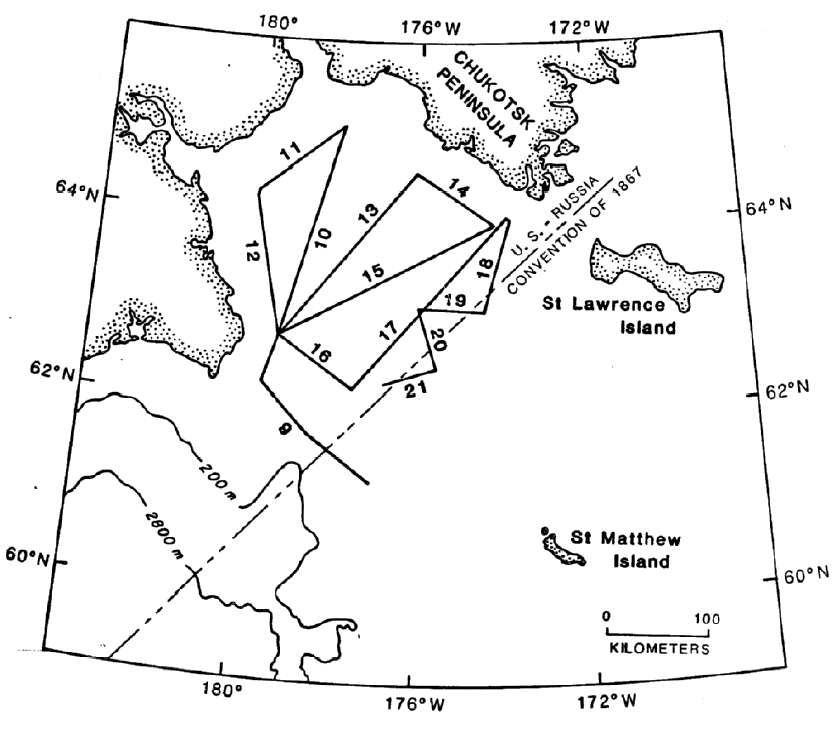
- NOAA Chart, Cape Navarin at the left center.

- Location in Chukotka Autonomous Okrug
- Location: Russian Far East
- Coordinates: 64°00′N 178°00′W
- River sources: Anadyr River; Velikaya; Kanchalan; Tumanskaya
- Ocean/sea sources: Bering Sea
- Basin countries: Russia
- Max. width: 402 kilometres (250 mi)
- Average depth: 105 metres (344 ft)
- Settlements: Anadyr

The Gulf of Anadyr, or Anadyr Bay (Russian: Анадырский залив), is a large bay on the Bering Sea in far northeast Siberia. It has a total surface area of 200,000 km^{2} (77,000 sq mi)

== Location ==
The bay is roughly rectangular and opens to the southeast. The corners are (clockwise from the south) Cape Navarin (another source says the adjacent Cape Thaddeus), Anadyr Estuary, Kresta Bay and Cape Chukotsky on the Chukchi Peninsula. It is about 250 mi (217 nmi; 402 km) across. A long gravel bar runs along the northeast shore for about 45 miles (39 nmi; 72 km) east from Kresta Bay. The Gulf of Anadyr is covered with ice normally ten months a year. Whales such as bowhead and gray may appear close to shore.

== Civilization ==
The town of Anadyr, the administrative centre of Chukotka Autonomous Okrug, is located on the Anadyr Estuary. Provideniya, on Komsomolskaya Bay (formerly Emma Harbor; a branch of Provideniya Bay), and Egvekinot, on Kresta Bay, are the next largest coastal settlements.

== See also ==
- Vtoraya River
