= Anadyr (river) =

River in Chukotka, Russia

Anadyr Анадырь / Онандырь / Йъаайваам
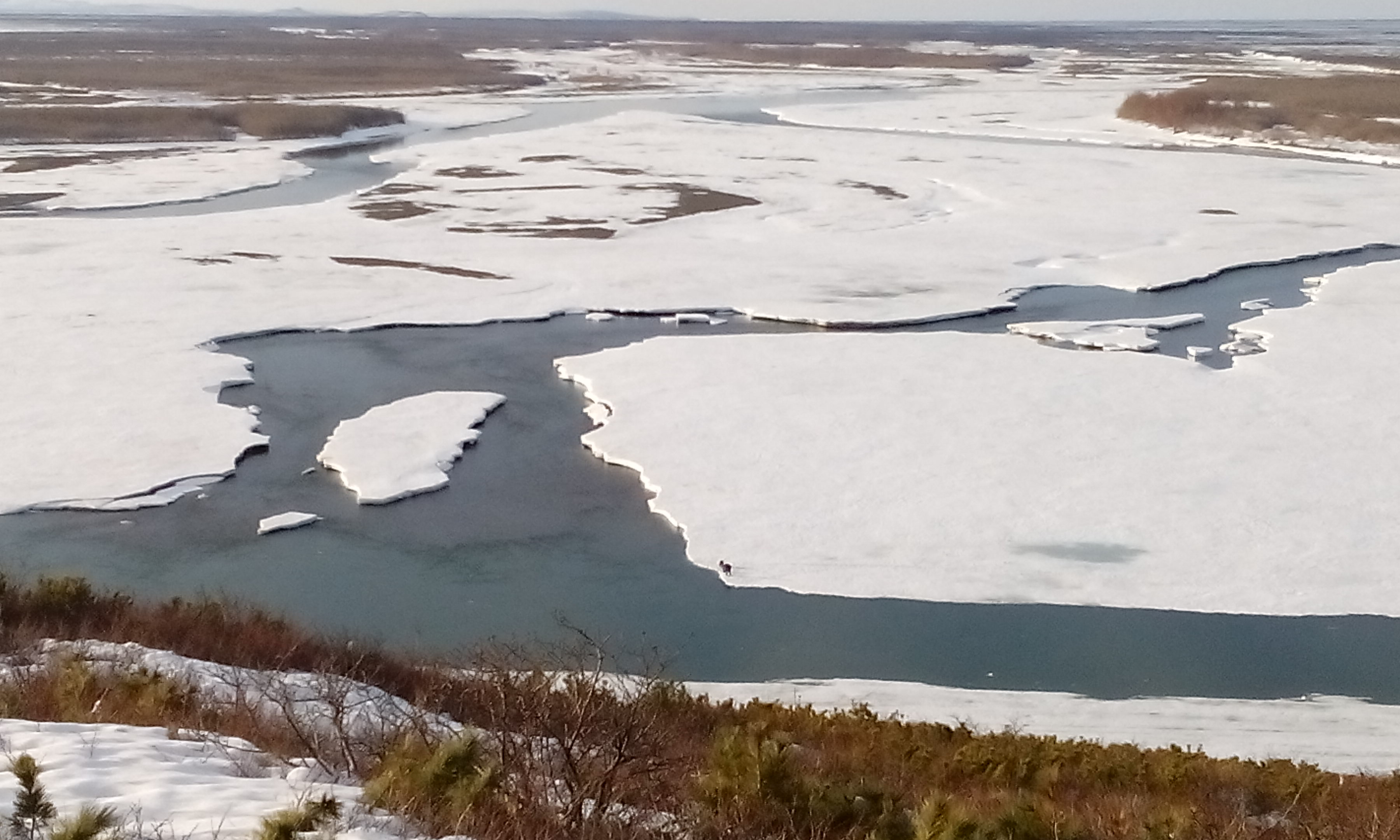
- Confluence of the Anadyr and the Belaya

- Mouth location in Chukotka, Russia

Location
- Country: Siberia, Russian Federation

Physical characteristics
- Source
  - location: Anadyr Highlands
  - coordinates: 67.0501°N 170.8464°E
  - elevation: 504 m (1,654 ft)
- Mouth: Bering Sea
  - location: Gulf of Anadyr
  - coordinates: 64.8732°N 176.2882°E
  - elevation: 0 m (0 ft)
- Length: 1,150 km (710 mi)
- Basin size: 191,000 km^{2} (74,000 sq mi)
- Discharge
  - location: Anadyr Estuary, Gulf of Anadyr
  - average: 2,020 m^{3}/s (71,000 cu ft/s)

Basin features
- Tributaries
  - left: Belaya, Tanyurer
  - right: Yablon, Yeropol, Mayn

The Anadyr (Russian: Анадырь [ɐˈnadɨrʲ]; Northern Yukaghir: Онандырь, romanized: Onandyr’; Chukot: Йъаайваам, romanized: J’āiwām) is a river in the far northeast of Siberia which flows into the Gulf of Anadyr of the Bering Sea and drains much of the interior of Chukotka Autonomous Okrug. Its basin corresponds to the Anadyrsky District of Chukotka.

== Geography ==
The Anadyr is 1,150 kilometres (710 mi) long and has a basin of 191,000 square kilometres (74,000 sq mi). It is frozen from October to late May and has a maximum flow in June with the snowmelt. It is navigable in small boats for about 570 kilometres (350 mi) to near Markovo. West of Markovo it is in the Anadyr Highlands (moderate mountains and valleys with a few trees) and east of Markovo it moves into the Anadyr Lowlands (very flat treeless tundra with lakes and bogs). The drop from Markovo to the sea is less than 100 feet (30 m).

It rises at about 67°N latitude and 171°E longitude in the Anadyr Highlands, near the headwaters of the Maly Anyuy, flows southwest receiving the waters of the rivers Yablon and Yeropol, turns east around the Shchuchy Range and passes Markvovo and the old site of Anadyrsk, turns north and east and receives the Mayn from the south, thereby encircling the Lebediny Zakaznik, turns northeast to receive the Belaya from the north in the Parapol-Belsky Lowlands, then past Ust-Belaya it turns southeast into the Anadyr Lowlands past the Ust-Tanyurer Zakaznik and receives the Tanyurer from the north. At Lake Krasnoye, it turns east and flows into the Onemen Bay of the Anadyr Estuary. If the Onemen Bay is considered part of the river, it also receives the Velikaya from the south and the Kanchalan from the north. Other important tributaries are the Yablon, Yeropol and Mamolina from the right and the Chineyveyem and Ubiyenka from the left.

Its basin is surrounded by the Amguema and Palyavaam basins to the north, the Bolshoy Anyuy, Oloy and Kolyma basins to the northwest, and the Penzhina basin to the southwest.

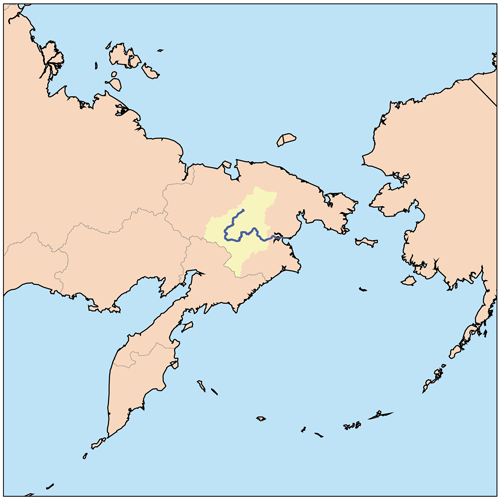
Location of the Anadyr

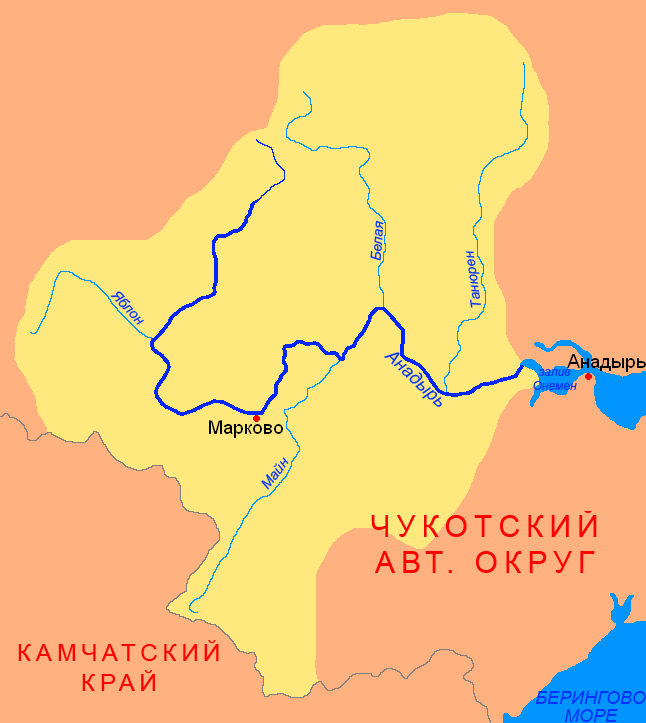
Basin of the Anadyr with its main tributaries

== History ==
In 1648, Semyon Dezhnev reached the mouth of the Anadyr after being shipwrecked on the coast. In 1649, he went upriver and built winter quarters at Anadyrsk. For the next 100 years, the Anadyr was the main route from the Arctic to the Pacific and Kamchatka. In the 18th century, the Anadyr was described by the polar explorer Dmitry Laptev.

== Ecology ==
The country through which it passes is thinly populated, and is dominated by tundra, with a rich variety of plant life. (Note: The area, which is still sparsely populated today, in 1911 it was described as "thinly populated".) Much of the region's landscapes are dominated by rugged mountains. For nine months of the year the ground is covered with snow, and the frozen rivers become navigable roads. George Kennan, an American working on the Western Union Telegraph Expedition in the late 1860s, found that dog sled travel on the lower Anadyr was limited by lack of firewood.

Reindeer, upon which the local inhabitants subsisted, were once found in considerable numbers, (Note: This point was made in 1911: "Reindeer, upon which the inhabitants subsist, are found in considerable numbers".) but the domestic reindeer population has collapsed dramatically since the reorganization and privatization of state-run collective farms beginning in 1992. As herds of domestic reindeer have declined, herds of wild caribou have increased.

There are ten species of salmon inhabiting the Anadyr river basin. Every year, on the last Sunday in April, there is an ice fishing competition in the frozen estuarine waters of the Anadyr's mouth. This festival is locally known as Korfest.

The area is a summering place for a number of migratory birds including brent geese, Eurasian wigeons, and the pintails of California.

== See also ==
- Operation Anadyr
