= Kamchatka Time =

Time zone in Russia (UTC+12)

- Time zone

UTC offset
- PETT: UTC+12:00

Current time
- 14:37, 6 January 2026 PETT [refresh]

Observance of DST
- DST is not observed in this time zone.

Time in Russia: KALT / Kaliningrad Time / UTC+2 / (MSK−1); MSK / Moscow Time / UTC+3 / (MSK±0); SAMT / Samara Time / UTC+4 / (MSK+1); YEKT / Yekaterinburg Time / UTC+5 / (MSK+2); OMST / Omsk Time / UTC+6 / (MSK+3); KRAT / Krasnoyarsk Time / UTC+7 / (MSK+4); IRKT / Irkutsk Time / UTC+8 / (MSK+5); YAKT / Yakutsk Time / UTC+9 / (MSK+6); VLAT / Vladivostok Time / UTC+10 / (MSK+7); MAGT / Magadan Time / UTC+11 / (MSK+8); PETT / Kamchatka Time / UTC+12 / (MSK+9)

Kamchatka Time (Russian: камчатское время, romanized: kamchatskoye vremya), also known as Petropavlovsk Time (PETT) or Anadyr Time (ANAT), is a time zone in Russia, named after the Kamchatka Peninsula. It is 12 hours ahead of UTC (UTC+12:00) and 9 hours ahead of Moscow Time (MSK+9). This time zone is used in the two easternmost regions of Russia after October 2014 and was also used before the time zone reform of 2010.

Kamchatka Summer Time (PETST) corresponded to UTC+13:00, but still 9 hours ahead of Moscow (MSD+9). This no longer exists as explained below.

On 28 March 2010, while most regions of Russia switched to Summer Time moving the clocks one hour forward, the two Russian regions using Kamchatka Time, Kamchatka Krai and Chukotka Autonomous Okrug, retained UTC+12:00, effectively joining Magadan Summer Time. Between 2011 and 2014 Russia observed "permanent" DST. When time in most of Russia was moved one hour back in October 2014, a separate MSK+9 time zone was reinstated but Daylight Saving Time was not re-introduced.

Main cities:

- Petropavlovsk-Kamchatsky
- Anadyr
- Vilyuchinsk
- Yelizovo

== IANA time zone database ==
In the zone.tab of the IANA time zone database, the zones with the same current offset are:

c.c.	Coordinates	Timezone name	Comments	UTC offset
RU	+5301+15839	Asia/Kamchatka	MSK+09 – Kamchatka	+12:00
RU	+6445+17729	Asia/Anadyr	MSK+09 – Bering Sea	+12:00

== See also ==
- Time in Russia
