= Cupalite =

Rare mineral

General
- Category: Native element class, alloy
- Formula: (Cu,Zn,Fe)Al
- IMA symbol: Cup
- Strunz classification: 1.AA.20
- Crystal system: Orthorhombic; Unknown space group

Identification
- Color: Steel-gray yellow
- Mohs scale hardness: 4-4.5
- Luster: Metallic
- Specific gravity: 5.12 g/cm^{3}
- Other characteristics: non-magnetic, non-radioactive

Cupalite is a rare mineral which is mostly composed of copper and aluminium, but might contain up to several percent of zinc or iron; its chemical structure is therefore described by an approximate formula (Cu,Zn)Al or (Cu,Fe)Al. It was discovered in 1985 in placers derived from serpentine, in association with another rare mineral khatyrkite (CuAl_{2}). Both minerals are thus far restricted to the area of the Iomrautvaam, in the Khatyrka ultramafic (silicon-poor) zone of the Koryak–Kamchatka fold area, Koryak Mountains, Anadyrsky District, Chukotka Autonomous Okrug, Far Eastern Federal District, Russia. The mineral name derives from cuprum (Latin for copper) and aluminium. Its holotype (defining sample) is preserved in the Mining Museum in Saint Petersburg, and parts of it can be found in other museums, such as Museo di Storia Naturale di Firenze.

== Properties ==
Cupalite forms dendritic, rounded or irregular grains, typically below 0.1 millimeter in size, which are intergrown with khatyrkite. They have an orthorhombic crystal structure with a yet uncertain space group and the lattice constants a = 0.695(1) nm, b = 0.416(1) nm, c = 1.004(1) nm, and 10 formula units per unit cell. Their Mohs hardness is between 4 and 4.5 and Vickers hardness is in the range 272–318 kg/mm^{2} for a 20–50 gram load.

Cupalite and khatyrkite are accompanied by spinel, corundum, stishovite, augite, forsteritic olivine, diopsidic clinopyroxene and several Al-Cu-Fe metal alloy minerals. They are remarkable by containing micrometre-sized grains of icosahedrite, a naturally occurring quasicrystal – aperiodic, yet ordered structure. The quasicrystal has a composition of Al_{63}Cu_{24}Fe_{13} and icosahedral symmetry. The presence of unoxidized aluminium in cupalite and association with the stishovite – a form of quartz which forms exclusively at high pressures of several tens GPa – suggest that cupalite is formed either upon meteoritic impact or in the deep earth mantle.
