= Paul Steinhardt =

American theoretical physicist (born 1952)

Paul J. Steinhardt
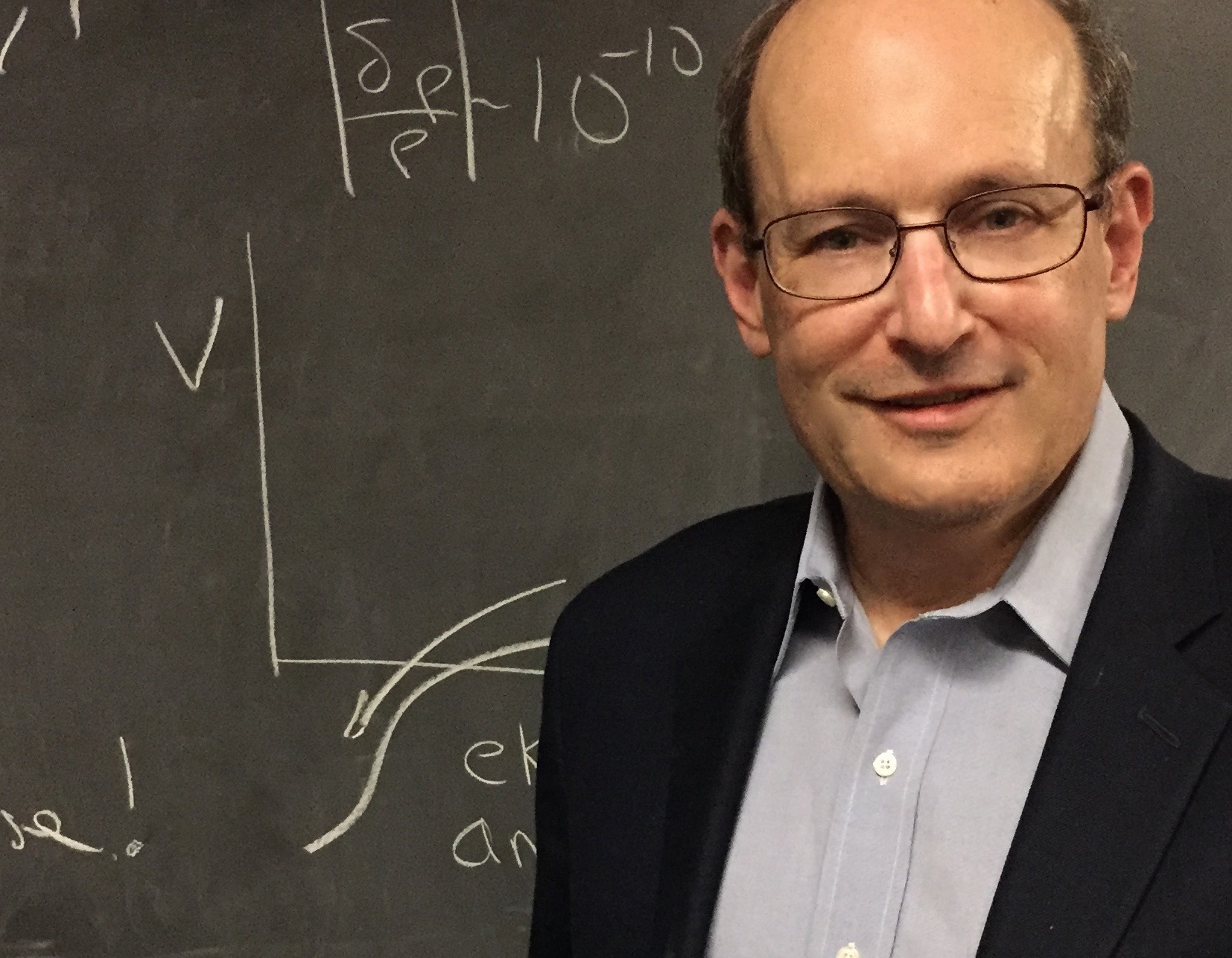
- Born: Paul Joseph Steinhardt; December 25, 1952 (age 73); Washington, D.C., U.S.
- Education: Caltech (B.S.); Harvard University (M.A., Ph.D.)
- Known for: Cosmic inflation; Cosmic coincidence problem; Eternal inflation; Cyclic model; Ekpyrotic universe; Quintessence; Self-interacting dark matter; Quasicrystals; Icosahedrite
- Awards: Guggenheim Fellowship (1994); Dirac Medal (2002); Oliver E. Buckley Condensed Matter Prize (2010); John Scott Award (2012); Simons Fellow (2012); Radcliffe Fellow (2012); Niels Bohr Institute Medal of Honour (2020)
- Scientific career
- Fields: Theoretical physics Cosmology; Condensed Matter Physics
- Workplaces: Princeton University; University of Pennsylvania; Harvard University; Caltech
- Thesis: Lattice theory of SU(N) flavor quantum electrodynamics in (1 + 1)-dimensions (1978)
- Doctoral advisor: Sidney R. Coleman
- Other academic advisors: Richard P. Feynman; Barry Barish; Frank Sciulli; Richard Alben; Praveen Chaudhari
- Doctoral students: Andreas Albrecht; Dov Levine; Katie Mack
- Website: paulsteinhardt.org

Paul Joseph Steinhardt (born December 25, 1952) is an American theoretical physicist whose principal research is in cosmology and condensed matter physics. He is currently the Albert Einstein Professor in Science at Princeton University, where he is on the faculty of both the Departments of Physics and of Astrophysical Sciences.

Steinhardt is best known for his development of new theories of the origin, evolution and future of the universe. He is also well known for his exploration of a new form of matter, known as quasicrystals, which were thought to exist only as man-made materials until he co-discovered the first known natural quasicrystal in a museum sample. He subsequently led a separate team that followed up that discovery with several more examples of natural quasicrystals recovered from the wilds of the Kamchatka Peninsula in far eastern Russia. Several years later, he and collaborators reported the accidental synthesis of a previously unknown type of quasicrystal in the remnants of the first atomic bomb test on July 16, 1945, at Alamagordo, New Mexico.

He has written two popular books on these topics. Endless Universe: Beyond the Big Bang (2007), co-authored with Neil Turok, describes the early struggles in challenging the widely accepted big bang theory and the subsequent development of the bouncing or cyclic theories of the universe, which are currently being explored and tested. The Second Kind of Impossible: The Extraordinary Quest for a New Form of Matter (2019) recounts the story of quasicrystals from his invention of the concept with his then-student Dov Levine, to his expedition to far eastern Russia to recover meteorite fragments containing natural quasicrystal grains formed billions of years ago.

== Education and career ==
Born in 1952 to Helen and Charles Steinhardt, Paul Steinhardt is the second oldest of four children. He grew up in Miami, Florida, where he attended Coral Gables Senior High School while attending classes at a local university. Steinhardt received his Bachelor of Science in physics at Caltech in 1974, and his Ph.D. in physics at Harvard University in 1978 where his advisor was Sidney Coleman. He was a Junior Fellow in the Harvard Society of Fellows from 1978 to 1981. He rose from junior faculty to Mary Amanda Wood Professor at the University of Pennsylvania between 1981 and 1998, during which he maintained a long-term association with the Thomas J. Watson Research Center, and has been on the faculty at Princeton University since the Fall of 1998. He co-founded the Princeton Center for Theoretical Science and served as its Director from 2007 to 2019.

== Research ==
=== Inflationary cosmology ===
Beginning in the early 1980s, Steinhardt co-authored seminal papers that helped to lay the foundations of inflationary cosmology.

==== Slow-roll inflation and generation of the seeds for galaxies ====
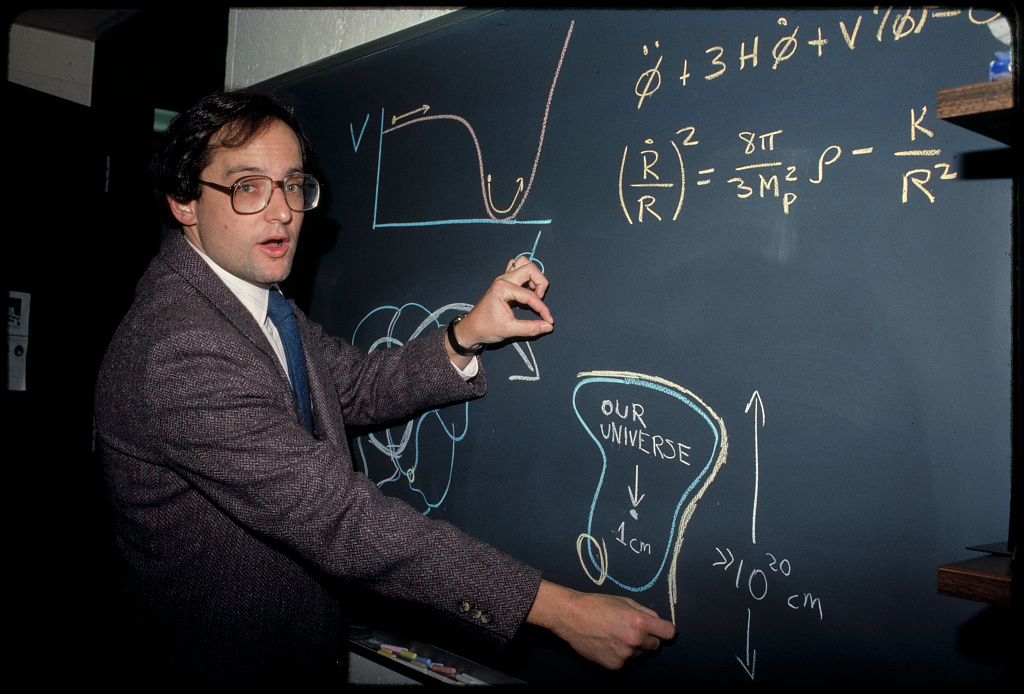
Steinhardt at the University of Pennsylvania

In 1982, Steinhardt and Andreas Albrecht (and, independently, Andrei Linde) constructed the first inflationary models that could speed up the expansion of the universe enough to explain the observed smoothness and flatness of the universe and then "gracefully exit" to the more modest expansion observed today. The Albrecht-Steinhardt paper was the first to note the effect of Hubble friction in sustaining inflation for a sufficiently long period (the "slow-roll" effect), setting the prototype for most subsequent inflationary models.

Hubble friction played a critical role in the 1983 paper by James Bardeen, Steinhardt and Michael S. Turner who were the first to introduce a reliable, relativistically gauge invariant method to compute how quantum fluctuations during inflation might naturally generate a nearly scale-invariant spectrum of density fluctuations with a small tilt, properties later shown by observations of the cosmic microwave background to be features of our universe. The density fluctuations are seeds about which galaxies eventually form. Contemporaneous calculations by several other groups obtained similar conclusions using less rigorous methods.

==== Eternal inflation and the multiverse ====
In 1982, Steinhardt presented the first example of eternal inflation. Neverending inflation was eventually shown to be a generic feature of inflationary models that leads to a multiverse, the break-up of space into an infinite multitude of patches spanning an infinite range of outcomes instead of the single smooth and flat universe, as originally hoped when first proposed.

Although some cosmologists would later come to embrace the multiverse, Steinhardt consistently expressed his concern that it utterly destroys the predictive power of the theory he helped create. Because the inflationary theory leads to a multiverse that allows for every possible outcome, Steinhardt argued, we must conclude that the inflationary theory actually predicts nothing.

In 1993, Robert Crittenden, Rick Davis, J.R. Bond, G. Efstathiou and Steinhardt performed the first calculations of the complete imprint of gravitational waves on the B-mode temperature maps and on the polarization of the microwave background radiation.

Despite his criticisms of the idea, Steinhardt's major contributions to the inflationary theory were recognized in 2002 when he shared the Dirac Prize with Alan Guth of M.I.T. and Andrei Linde of Stanford.

In 2013, Anna Ijjas, Abraham Loeb and Steinhardt added to the criticisms in a widely discussed pair of papers that the inflationary model was much less likely to explain our universe than previously thought.

According to their analysis of the Planck satellite 2013 results, the chances of obtaining a universe matching the observations after a period of inflation is less than one in a googolplex. Steinhardt and his team dubbed the result the "unlikeliness problem." The two papers also showed that Planck satellite data ruled out what had been historically accepted as the simplest inflationary models and that the remaining inflationary models require more parameters, more fine-tuning of those parameters, and more unlikely initial conditions.

In 2015, the unlikeness problem was reaffirmed and strengthened by a subsequent round of measurements reported by the Planck satellite team.

In 2018, Steinhardt, in collaboration with Prateek Agrawal, George Obieds, and Cumrun Vafa, argued that inflation may also be incompatible with string theory because inflationary models generally violate constraints (sometimes called the "swampland conjectures") on what is required for a model to be consistent with quantum gravity.

=== Bouncing and cyclic cosmology ===
Motivated by what he viewed as the failures of inflationary theory, including but not limited to the multiverse, Steinhardt became a leading developer of a new class of cosmological models that replace the so-called big bang with a bounce and replace inflation with a period of slow contraction preceding the bounce. The hypothetical idea that the universe began with a bang is based on extrapolating back in time, assuming that Einstein's equations of general relativity remain valid at energies and temperatures far greater than have ever been tested.

Theorists generally agree that, if there was a big bang, then, in the instants following, quantum physics effects should have created large fluctuations in spacetime. These fluctuations would have caused space-time to curve and warp and the distribution of energy to become very uneven, all of which is inconsistent with what experimentalists observe when they study the early universe. The universe is, in fact, observed to be homogeneous. Inflation was originally invented to explain the smoothness that is observed in the universe. But it is unclear how to transition from the highly uneven conditions created after a big bang to an inflationary universe and, even if a solution could be found, the inflationary theory ultimately results in a multiverse rather than a smooth universe.

The new approach removes the bang altogether, envisioning instead a smooth transition from a previous period of slow contraction to the current period of expansion. If the contraction is slow, it smooths the entire universe, and, unlike inflation there is no multiverse. By evading the infamous cosmic singularity problem associated with a big bang, a bounce avoids quantum gravity effects that produce an unsmooth universe. A natural extension of these ideas is a never-beginning and never-ending cyclic universe in which epochs of bounce, expansion, and contraction repeat at regular intervals.

In a pivotal lecture in 2021, Steinhardt explained why it is time to jettison the big bang theory and replace the bang with a 'bounce' — a smooth transition from contraction to a dense, hot universe that continues to expand and cool.

==== Historical development ====
===== Early models with a big crunch =====
In 2001, Steinhardt presented the first examples of these bouncing and cyclic models, referred to as "ekpyrotic," in papers with Justin Khoury, Burt A. Ovrut and Neil Turok.

These models were based on the speculative notion suggested by string theory that the universe has extra-dimensions bounded by "branes" (where "brane" is derived from "membrane," a basic object in string theory). The fiery collision and rebound of these branes is comparable to a big crunch, a violent event that would depend sensitively on strong quantum gravity effects that are not yet established and may create tremendous curvature and warping of spacetime.

In principle, the collisions can repeat at regular intervals resulting in a cyclic universe. In 2002, Steinhardt and Turok incorporated the ekpyrotic idea into an early version of a cyclic theory of the universe.

===== Improved models with slow contraction and a gentle bounce =====
Recent versions of bouncing cosmology developed by Anna Ijjas and Steinhardt introduce elements that simplify and address problems with the earlier ekpyrotic proposal. They do not require extra dimensions or branes or string theory; ordinary fields with potential energy evolving in space-time, similar to inflationary models, can be used.

Instead of a violent ekpyrosis (the collision of two branes), the smoothing and flattening of spacetime occurs through "slow contraction," a period in which space contracts very little while the Hubble radius contracts a lot. By the time the bounce is reached, the universe is "supersmoothed."

The bounce is a gentle transition that can be fully computed and maintains smoothness because it is a continuous process that occurs long before quantum gravity effects become strong. There is no cosmic singularity problem, unlike theories based on the big bang.

===== Universal smoothing and ultralocality =====
To test these ideas, Anna Ijjas adapted the tools of numerical general relativity, originally invented to simulate the merger of black holes and the emission of gravitational waves, to cosmology. Together with Steinhardt and collaborators, the new tools were used to study the effectiveness of slow contraction.

The study demonstrates that slow contraction is a supersmoothing cosmological phase that homogenizes, isotropizes and flattens the universe both classically and quantum mechanically and can do so far more robustly and rapidly than had been realized in earlier studies.

Beginning from wildly unsmooth and curvy starting condition, the studies verified that slow contraction smooths virtually all of spacetime due to an effect of general relativity known as ultralocality. The ultralocal effect is specific to a contracting universe, and there is no equivalent in an expanding universe, including the case of inflation. The consequent smoothing power is an unparalleled advantage of slow contraction.

===== Cyclic version of bouncing cosmology =====
In the cyclic version of these models, space never crunches; rather, it necessarily grows by a constant factor overall from bounce to bounce every 100 billion years or so. After each bounce, gravitational energy is converted into the matter and radiation that fuels the next cycle. To an observer, the evolution appears to be cyclic because the temperature, density, number of stars and galaxies, etc., are on average the same from one cyclic to the next and the observer cannot see far enough to know that there is an ever-increasing amount of space, matter energy outside the horizon. The fact that the universe expands overall from cycle to cycle means that the entropy produced in earlier cycles (by the formation of stars and other entropy-producing processes) is increasingly diluted as the cycles proceed and so does not have any physical effect on cosmic evolution. This growth from cycle to cycle and associated entropy dilution are features that distinguish these new cyclic models from versions discussed in the 1920s by Friedmann and Tolman, and explain how the new cyclic model avoids the "entropy problem" that beset earlier versions.

==== Theoretical advantages of the new cyclic model ====
The new cyclic models have two important advantages over inflationary models. First, because they do not include inflation, they do not produce a multiverse. As a result, unlike inflation, cyclic models produce a single universe that everywhere have the same predicted properties that are subject to empirical tests. Second, cyclic models explain why there must be dark energy. According to these models, the accelerated expansion caused by dark energy starts the smoothing process, the decay of dark energy to other forms of energy starts a period of slow contraction, and the slow contraction is what is responsible for smoothing and flattening the universe.

==== Theoretical predictions of the new cyclic model ====
One prediction of the cyclic models is that, unlike inflation, no detectable gravitational waves are generated during the smoothing and flattening process. The Simons Observatory being built in the Atacama Desert in Chile will test this prediction. Instead, the prediction of the cyclic models is that the only source of gravitational waves on cosmic wavelength scales are so-called "secondary gravitational waves" that are produced long after the bounce. Their amplitudes are far too weak to be found in current detectors but are ultimately detectable. A second prediction is that the current acceleration expansion must eventually stop and the vacuum must be eventually decay in order to initiate the next cycle.(Other predictions depend on the specific fields (or branes) that cause the contraction.)

==== Observational support for the new cyclic model ====
The cyclic model may naturally explain why the cosmological constant is exponentially small and positive, compared to the enormous value expected by quantum gravity theories. The cosmological constant might begin large, as expected, but then might slowly decay over the course of many cycles to the tiny value observed today.

The discovery of the Higgs field at the Large Hadron Collider (LHC) may provide added support for the cyclic model. Evidence from the LHC suggests that the current vacuum may decay in the future, according to calculations made by Steinhardt, Turok and Itzhak Bars. The decay of the current vacuum is required by the cyclic model in order to end the current phase of expansion, contract, bounce and begin a new era of expansion; the Higgs provides a possible mechanism of decay that can be tested. The Higgs field is a viable candidate for the field that drives the cycles of expansion and contraction, and this may ultimately be testable.

=== Dark energy and dark matter ===
Steinhardt has made significant contributions researching the "dark side" of the universe: dark energy, the cosmological constant problem and dark matter.

In 1995, Steinhardt and Jeremiah Ostriker used a concordance of cosmological observations to show there must be a non-zero dark energy component today, more than 65 percent of the total energy density, sufficient to cause the expansion of the universe to accelerate. This was verified three years later by supernova observations in 1998.

Working with colleagues, he subsequently introduced the concept of quintessence, a form of dark energy that varies with time. It was first posited by Steinhardt's team as an alternative to the cosmological constant, which is (by definition) constant and static; quintessence is dynamic. Its energy density and pressure evolve over time. The 2018 paper on swampland conjectures with Agrawal, Obieds and Vafa points to quintessence as being the only option for dark energy in string theory and consistent quantum gravity.

In 2000, David Spergel and Steinhardt first introduced the concept of strongly self-interacting dark matter (SIDM) to explain various anomalies in standard cold dark models based on assuming dark matter consists of weakly interacting massive particles (also referred to as "WIMPs").

In 2014, Steinhardt, Spergel and Jason Pollack have proposed that a small fraction of dark matter could have ultra-strong self-interactions, which would cause the particles to coalesce rapidly and collapse into seeds for early supermassive black holes.

=== Quasicrystals ===
==== Development of the theory ====
In 1983, Steinhardt and his then-student Dov Levine first introduced the theoretical concept of quasicrystals in a patent disclosure. The complete theory was published the following year in a paper entitled "Quasicrystals: A New Class of Ordered Structures." The theory proposed the existence of a new phase of solid matter analogous to Penrose tilings with rotational symmetries previously thought to be impossible for solids. Steinhardt and Levine named the new phase of matter a "quasicrystal." The never-before-seen atomic structure had quasiperiodic atomic ordering, rather than the periodic ordering characteristic of conventional crystals.

The new theory overturned 200 years of scientific dogma and proved that quasicrystals could violate all of the previously accepted mathematical theorems about the symmetry of matter. Symmetries once thought to be forbidden for solids are actually possible for quasicrystals, including solids with axes of five-fold symmetry and three-dimensional icosahedral symmetry.

==== The first reported example of a synthetic quasicrystal ====
Working simultaneously to, but independently of, Steinhardt and Levine, Dan Shechtman, Ilan Blech, Denis Gratias and John Cahn at the National Bureau of Standards (NBS) were focused on an experimental discovery they could not explain. It was an unusual alloy of manganese and aluminum with a diffraction pattern of what appeared to be sharp (though not perfectly point-like) spots arranged with icosahedral symmetry that did not fit any known crystal structure. The alloy was first noted in 1982, but results were not published until November 1984 after more convincing data had been obtained.

Steinhardt and Levine were shown a preprint of the Shechtman team's paper and immediately recognized that it could be experimental proof of their still-unpublished quasicrystal theory. The theory, along with the proposal that it could explain the mysterious, forbidden structure of the new alloy was published in December 1984.

The new alloy was ultimately discovered to be problematic. It proved to be unstable and the noted imperfections in the diffraction pattern allowed for multiple explanations (including one about crystal twinning proposed by Linus Pauling) that were hotly debated for the next few years.

In 1987, An-Pang Tsai and his group at Japan's Tohoku University made an important breakthrough with the synthesis of the first-ever stable icosahedral quasicrystal. It had sharp diffraction spots arranged in close accord with Steinhardt and Levine's quasicrystal theory and was inconsistent with any of the alternative explanations. The theoretical debate was effectively ended and the Steinhardt-Levine theory gained wide acceptance.

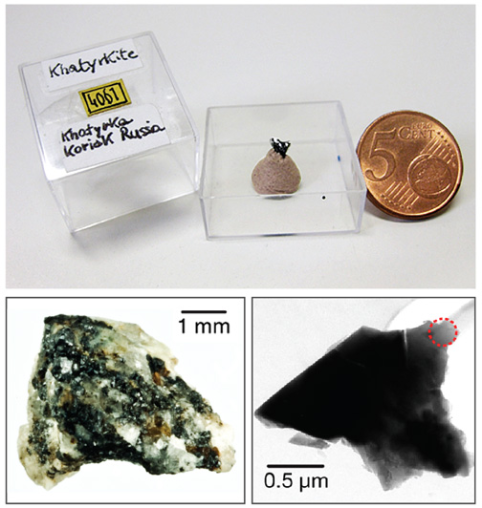
Small sample, about 3 mm across, of a Khatyrkite-bearing meteorite (top and bottom left panels)from the mineral collection at the Museo di Storia Naturale in Florence, Italy. On January 2, 2009, Paul Steinhardt and Nan Yao identified the first known natural quasicrystal embedded in the sample (area of discovery indicated by red circle in bottom right panel).

==== The first natural quasicrystal ====
In 1999, Steinhardt assembled a team at Princeton University to search for a natural quasicrystal. The team, composed of Peter Lu, Ken Deffeyes and Nan Yao, devised a novel mathematical algorithm to search through an international database of powder diffraction patterns.

For the first eight years, the search yielded no results. In 2007, Italian scientist Luca Bindi, then curator of the mineral collection at the Universite' di Firenze, joined the team. Two years later, Bindi identified a promising specimen in his museum's storage room. The tiny specimen, a few millimeters across, had been packed away in a box labeled "khatyrkite," which is an ordinary crystal composed of copper and aluminum. On January 2, 2009, Steinhardt and Nan Yao, director of the Princeton Imaging Center, examined the material and identified the signature diffraction pattern of an icosahedral quasicrystal. This was the first known natural quasicrystal.

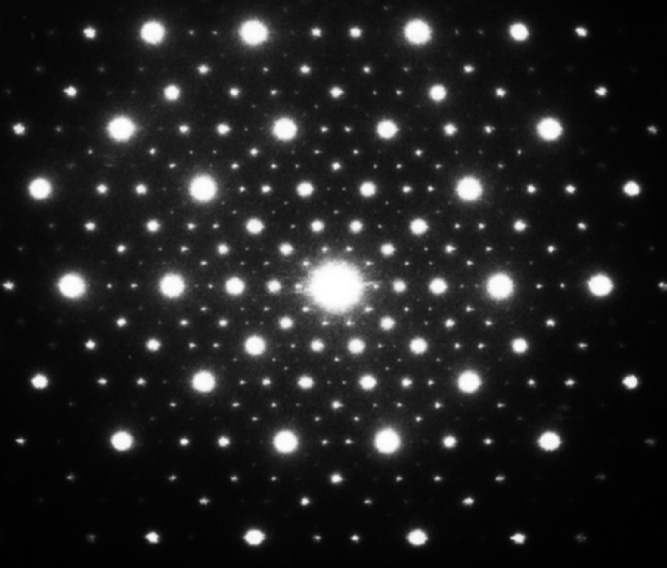
The electron diffraction pattern for icosahedrite, the first natural quasicrystal, obtained by aiming the electron beam down a fivefold axis of symmetry. The patterns correspond perfectly (up to experimental resolution) with the fivefold patterns first predicted by Paul Steinhardt and Dov Levine in the 1980s for an icosahedral quasicrystal.

The International Mineralogical Association accepted the quasicrystal as a new mineral and designated its name, icosahedrite. The material had exactly the same atomic composition (Al_{63}Cu_{24}Fe_{13}) as the first thermodynamically stable quasicrystal synthesized by An-Pang Tsai and his group in their laboratory in 1987.

==== Expedition to Chukotka ====
Two years after identifying the museum sample, Steinhardt organized an international team of experts and led them on an expedition to its source, the remote Listventovyi stream in the Chukotka Autonomous Okrug in the northern half of the Kamchatka Peninsula in far eastern Russia. The team included Bindi and Valery Kryachko, the Russian ore geologist who had found the original samples of khatyrkite crystal while working at the Listventovyi stream in 1979.

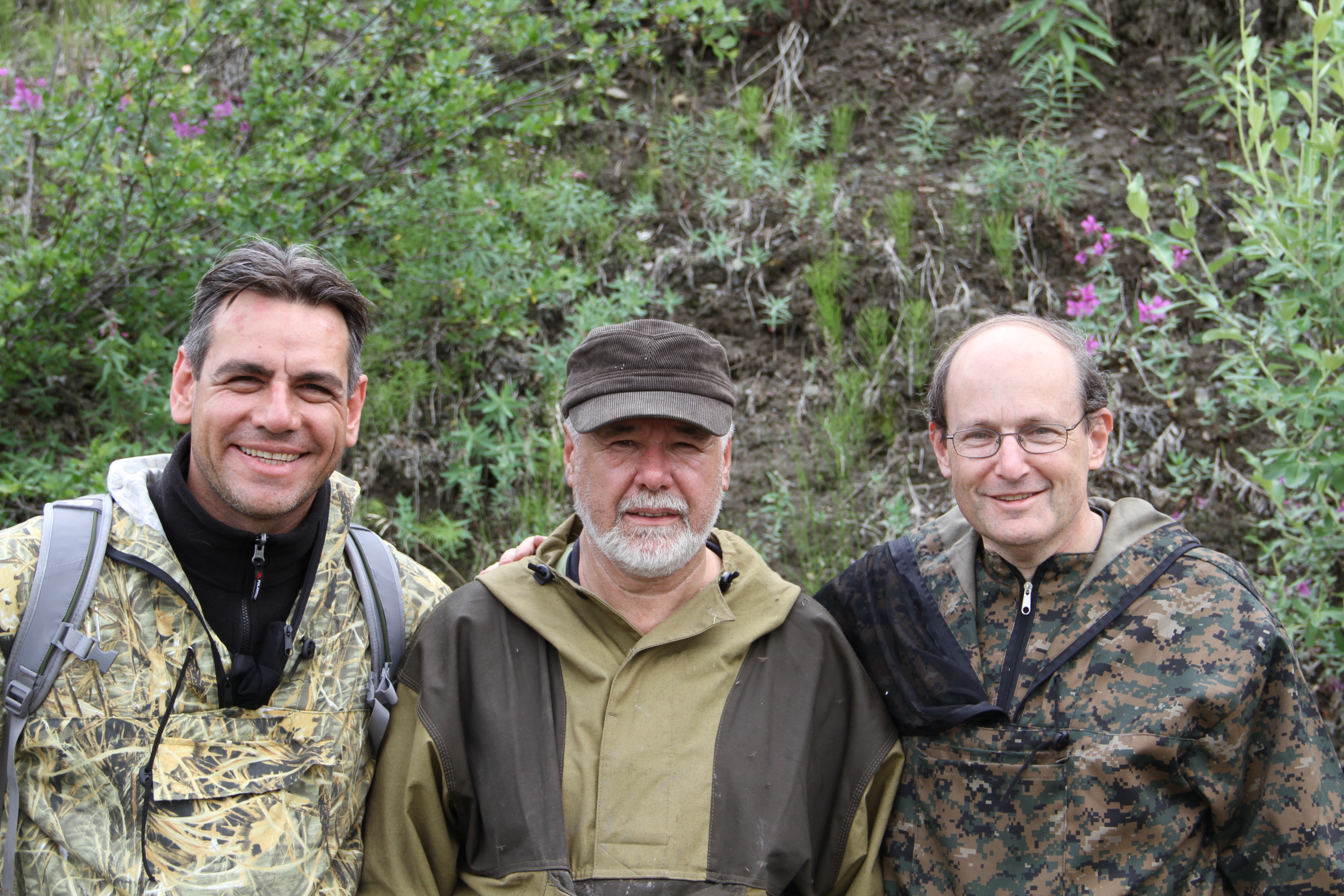
On location at the Listventovyi stream in the Kamchatka Peninsula in 2011 (left to right): Luca Bindi (University of Firenze, Italy), Valery Kryachko (IGEM, Russia) and Paul Steinhardt (Princeton, US)

Other members of the team were: Chris Andronicos, Vadim Distler, Michael Eddy, Alexander Kostin, Glenn MacPherson, Marina Yudovskaya, and Steinhardt's son, William Steinhardt.

After digging and panning a ton and a half of clay along the banks of the Listvenitovyi stream in the Koryak Mountains, eight different grains containing icosahedrite were identified. During subsequent years of study, Steinhardt's team proved that both the sample found in the Florence museum and the samples recovered from the field in Chukotka originated from a meteorite formed 4.5 billion years ago (before there were planets), and landed on the Earth about 15,000 years ago.

==== More natural quasicrystals ====
Further studies revealed other new minerals in the Chukotka samples. In 2014, one of those minerals was discovered to be a crystalline phase of aluminum, nickel and iron (Al_{38}Ni_{33}Fe_{30}). It was accepted by the International Mineralogical Association and named "steinhardtite" in Steinhardt's honor In 2015, a second type of natural quasicrystal was discovered in a different grain of the same meteorite. The second known natural quasicrystal was found to be a different mixture of aluminum, nickel and iron (Al_{71}Ni_{24}Fe_{5}) and had a decagonal symmetry (a regularly stacking of atomic layers which each have 10-fold symmetry). It was accepted by the International Mineralogical Association and given the name "decagonite."

Three more crystalline minerals were also discovered and named after colleagues involved in Steinhardt's quasicrystal research: "hollisterite," for Princeton petrologist Lincoln Hollister; "kryachkoite," for Russian geologist Valery Kryachko; and "stolperite," for Caltech's former provost Ed Stolper.

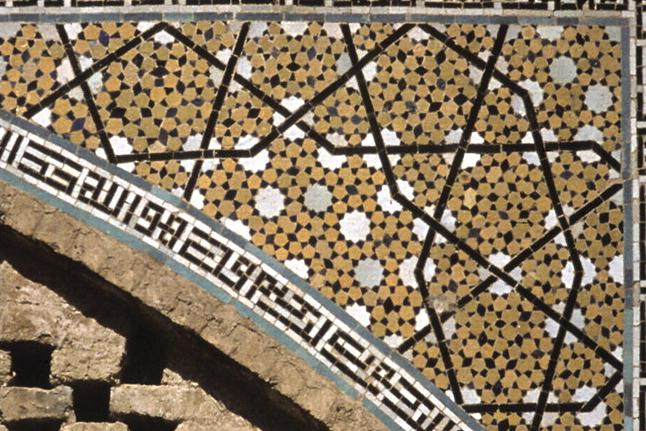
Girih tile quasicrystal pattern on right half of spandrel at Darb-e Imam Shrine

==== A previously unknown quasicrystal created by the first atomic bomb test ====
In 2021, Steinhardt led the team that discovered a novel icosahedral quasicrystal created by the detonation of the first nuclear device at Alamogordo, New Mexico, on July 16, 1945 (the Trinity test). The new quasicrystal was discovered within a sample of red trinitite and is the oldest extant anthropogenic quasicrystal ever discovered. The previously unknown structure, which is made of iron, silicon, copper and calcium, is thought to have been formed by the fusion of vaporized desert sand and copper cables during the atomic test blast. The discovery of a unique quasicrystal in trinitite could transform the field of nuclear forensics, leading to a new diagnostic tool which could help law enforcement prevent future terrorist attacks by using quasicrystals (which unlike radioactive debris and gases do not decay) to identify the signature of an atomic weapon and track down the culprits.

==== Other contributions to the field ====
Steinhardt and his collaborators have made significant contributions to understanding the quasicrystals' unique mathematical and physical properties, including theories of how and why quasicrystals form and their elastic and hydrodynamics properties.

Peter J. Lu and Steinhardt discovered a quasicrystalline Islamic tiling on the Darb-e Imam Shrine (1453 A.D.) in Isfahan, Iran constructed from girih tiles. In 2007, they deciphered the manner in which early artists created increasingly complex periodic girih patterns. Those early designs were shown to have culminated in the development of a nearly perfect quasi-crystalline pattern five centuries before the discovery of Penrose patterns and the Steinhardt-Levine quasicrystal theory.

=== Photonics and hyperuniformity ===
Steinhardt's research on quasicrystals and other non-crystalline solids expanded into work on designer materials with novel photonic and phononic properties.

Photonic quasicrystals

A team of researchers including Steinhardt, Paul Chaikin, Weining Man and Mischa Megens designed and tested the first photonic quasicrystal with icosahedral symmetry in 2005. They were the first to demonstrate the existence of photonic band gaps ("PBGs"). These materials block light for a finite range of frequencies (or colors) and let pass light with frequencies outside that band, similar to the way in which a semiconductor blocks electrons for a finite range of energies.

Hyperuniform disordered solids (HUDS)

Working with Salvatore Torquato and Marian Florescu, in 2009 Steinhardt discovered a new class of photonic materials called hyperuniform disordered solids (HUDS), and showed that solids consisting of a hyperuniform disordered arrangement of dielectric elements produce band gaps with perfect spherical symmetry. These materials, which act as isotropic semiconductors for light, can be used to control and manipulate light in a wide range of applications including optical communications, photonic computers, energy harvesting, non-linear optics and improved light sources.

Phoamtonics

In 2019, Steinhardt, along with Michael Klatt and Torquato, introduced the idea of "phoamtonics," which refers to photonic materials based on foam-like designs. They showed that large photonic bandgaps could arise in network structures created by converting the foam edges (intersections between foam bubbles) to a dielectric material for the two most famous crystalline foam structures, Kelvin foams and Weiare-Phelan foams.

Etaphase Inc.

The meta-material breakthroughs by Steinhardt and his Princeton colleagues have valuable commercial applications. In 2012, the scientists helped create a start-up company called Etaphase, which will apply their discoveries to a wide range of high performance products. The inventions will be used in integrated circuits, structural materials, photonics, communications, chip-to-chip communications, intra-chip communications, sensors, datacomm, networking, and solar applications.

=== Amorphous solids ===
Steinhardt's research in disordered forms of matter has centered on the structure and properties of glasses and amorphous semiconductors, and amorphous metals.

He constructed the first computer generated continuous random network (CRN) model of glass and amorphous silicon in 1973, while still an undergraduate at Caltech. CRNs remain the leading model of amorphous silicon and other semiconductors today. Working with Richard Alben and D. Weaire, he used the computer model to predict structural and electronic properties.

Working with David Nelson and Marco Ronchetti, Steinhardt formulated mathematical expressions, known as "orientational order parameters", for computing the degree of alignment of interatomic bonds in liquids and solids in 1981. Applying them to computer simulations of monatomic supercooled liquids, they showed that the atoms form arrangements with finite-range icosahedral (soccer-ball like) bond orientational order as liquids cool.

== Honors and awards ==
- In 1986, Steinhardt was elected as a Fellow in the American Physical Society in recognition of his contributions to cosmology and to the theoretical understanding of quasicrystals.
- In 1994, he was named a Guggenheim Fellow.
- In 1998, he was elected to the United States National Academy of Sciences.
- In 2002, Steinhardt was honored for his work on the inflationary model of the universe with the P.A.M. Dirac Medal from the International Centre for Theoretical Physics. He shared the award with Alan Guth of MIT and Andrei Linde of Stanford.
- In 2010, Steinhardt received the Oliver E. Buckley Condensed Matter Prize of the American Physical Society for his pioneering contributions to the theory of quasicrystals.
- In 2012, he received the John Scott Award for his work on quasicrystals.
- In 2012, Steinhardt was named Simons Fellow in Theoretical Physics and Radcliffe Fellow at the Radcliffe Institute for Advanced Study at Harvard.
- In 2014, he received the Caltech Distinguished Alumni Award.
- In 2014, the International Mineralogical Association accepted a new mineral from the Khatyrka meteorite into the official catalogue of natural minerals, and named it "steinhardtite" in his honor.
- In 2018, he shared the Aspen Institute Italia Award with Luca Bindi for scientific research and collaboration between Italy and the United States.
- In 2020, he received the Niels Bohr Institute Medal of Honour.
