= Icosahedrite =

Quasicrystalline mineral

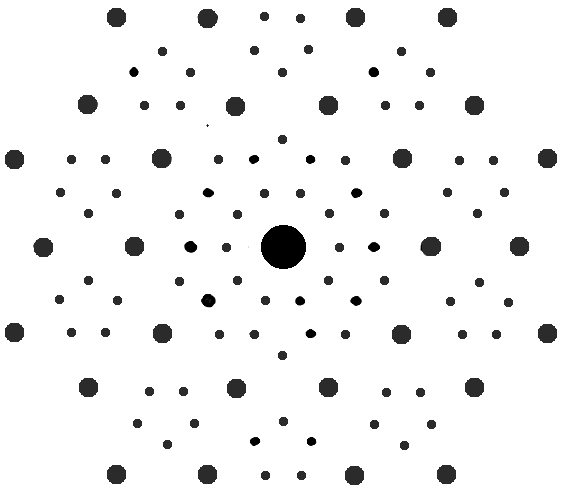
- X-ray diffraction pattern of the natural Al_{63}Cu_{24}Fe_{13}, icosahedrite.

General
- Category: Native element mineral
- Formula: Al_{63}Cu_{24}Fe_{13}
- IMA symbol: Ihd
- Crystal system: Quasicrystal
- Space group: Icosahedral; H-M symbol: 5̅ 3̅m Space group: Fm 3̅ 5̅

Identification
- Color: Dark grey, black
- Crystal habit: Subhedral to anhedral grains
- Fracture: Irregular
- Luster: Metallic
- Streak: Grey
- Diaphaneity: Opaque
- Optical properties: Isotropic

Icosahedrite is the first known naturally occurring quasicrystal phase. It has the composition Al_{63}Cu_{24}Fe_{13} and is a mineral approved by the International Mineralogical Association in 2010. Its discovery followed a 10-year-long systematic search by an international team of scientists led by Luca Bindi and Paul J. Steinhardt to find the first natural quasicrystal.

It occurs as tiny grains in a small sample labelled "khatyrkite" (catalog number 46407/G, housed in The Museum of Natural History, University of Florence, Italy), collected from an outcrop of weathered serpentinite in the Khatyrka ultramafic zone of the Koryak-Kamchatka area, Koryak Mountains, Russia. The rock sample also contains spinel, diopside, forsterite, nepheline, sodalite, corundum, stishovite, khatyrkite, cupalite and an unnamed AlCuFe alloy. Evidence shows that the sample is actually extraterrestrial in origin, delivered to the Earth by a CV3 carbonaceous chondrite asteroid that dates back 4.5 Gya. A geological expedition has identified the exact place of the original discovery and found more specimens of the meteorite. The same Al-Cu-Fe quasicrystal phase had previously been created in the laboratory by Japanese experimental metallurgists in the late 1980s.

The concept of quasicrystals — along with the term — was first introduced in 1984 by Steinhardt and Dov Levine, both then at the University of Pennsylvania. The first synthetic quasicrystal, a combination of aluminium and manganese, was reported in 1984 by Israeli materials scientist Dan Shechtman and colleagues at the U.S. National Institute of Standards and Technology, a finding for which Shechtman won the 2011 Nobel Prize for Chemistry.
