= Khatyrkite =

Rare mineral primarily made of copper and aluminum

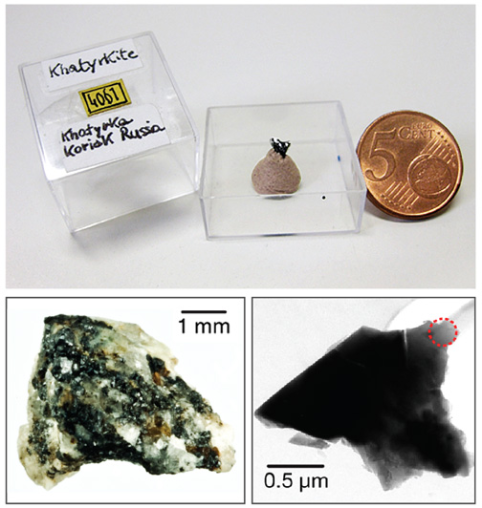
- Khatyrkite sample.

General
- Category: Native element class, alloy
- Formula: (Cu,Zn,Fe)Al_{2}
- IMA symbol: Ktk
- Strunz classification: 1.AA.15
- Crystal system: Tetragonal
- Crystal class: Ditetragonal dipyramidal (4/mmm); H-M symbol: (4/m 2/m 2/m)
- Space group: I4/mcm
- Unit cell: a = 6.06, c = 4.87 [Å]; Z = 4

Identification
- Color: Gray-yellow (reflection)
- Crystal habit: Prismatic crystals and intergrowths with cupalite
- Cleavage: {100}, distinct
- Tenacity: Malleable
- Mohs scale hardness: 5–6
- Luster: Metallic
- Streak: Dark gray
- Diaphaneity: Opaque
- Specific gravity: 4.42 (calculated)
- Optical properties: Distinctly anisotropic, grayish yellow to brownish red

Khatyrkite (/ˈkætiərkaɪt/ KAT-ee-ər-kyte) is a rare mineral which is mostly composed of copper and aluminium, but may contain up to about 15% of zinc or iron. Its chemical structure is described by an approximate formula (Cu,Zn)Al_{2} or (Cu,Fe)Al2. It was discovered in 1985 in a placer in association with another rare mineral cupalite ((Cu,Zn,Fe)Al). These two minerals have only been found at 62°39′11″N 174°30′02″E in the area of the Iomrautvaam, a tributary of the Khatyrka river, in the Koryak Mountains, in Anadyrsky District (former Beringovsky District), Chukotka, Russia. Analysis of one of the samples containing khatyrkite showed that the small rock was from a meteorite. A geological expedition has identified the exact place of the original discovery and found more specimens of the Khatyrka meteorite. The mineral's name derives from the Khatyrka (Russian: Хатырка) zone where it was discovered. Its type specimen (defining sample) is preserved in the Mining Museum in Saint Petersburg, and parts of it can be found in other museums, such as Museo di Storia Naturale di Firenze.

== Properties ==
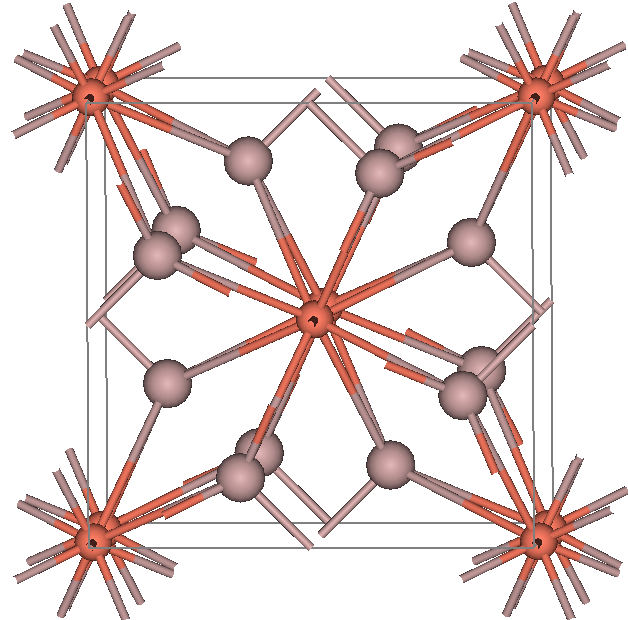
Khatyrkite viewed close to the tetragonal axis. Red balls are copper atoms.

In the initial studies of khatyrkite, a negative correlation was observed between copper and zinc, i.e. the higher the copper the lower the zinc content and vice versa, which is why the formula was specified as (Cu,Zn)Al_{2}. It was found later that iron can be substituted for zinc. The mineral is opaque and has a steel-gray yellow tint in reflected light, similar to native platinum. Isotropic sections are light blue whereas anisotropic ones are blue to creamy pink. Strong optical anisotropy is observed when the crystals are viewed in polarized light. Khatyrkite forms dendritic, rounded or irregular grains, typically below 0.5 millimeter in size, which are intergrown with cupalite. They have a tetragonal symmetry with point group 4/m 2/m 2/m, space group I4/mcm and lattice constants a = 0.607(1) nm, c = 0.489(1) nm and four formula units per unit cell. The crystalline structure parameters are the same for khatyrkite and synthetic CuAl_{2} alloy. The density, as calculated from XRD the lattice parameters, is 4.42 g/cm^{3}. The crystals are malleable, that is they deform rather than break apart upon a strike; they have the Mohs hardness is between 5 and 6 and Vickers hardness is in the range 511–568 kg/mm^{2} for a 20–50 gram load and 433–474 kg/mm^{2} for a 100 gram load.

Khatyrkite and cupalite are accompanied by spinel, corundum, stishovite, augite, forsteritic olivine, diopsidic clinopyroxene and several Al-Cu-Fe metal alloy minerals. The presence of unoxidized aluminium in khatyrkite and association with the stishovite—a form of quartz which exclusively forms at high pressures of several tens gigapascals—suggest that the mineral was formed in a high-energy impact involving the object that became the Khatyrka meteorite.

- Phillip Broadwith (4 June 2009). "Natural quasicrystals discovered". Chemistry World.

== Relation to quasicrystals ==
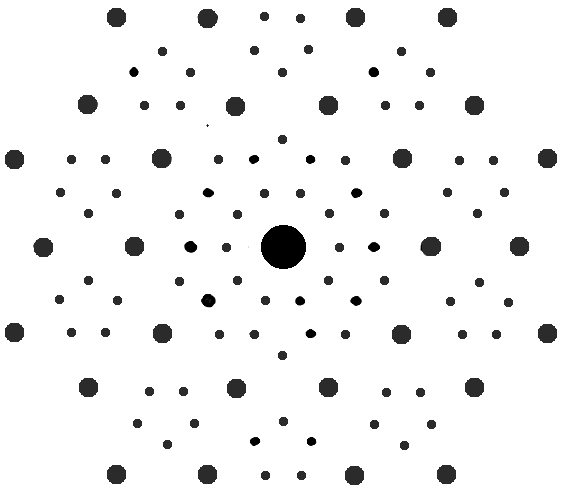
X-ray diffraction pattern of the natural Al_{63}Cu_{24}Fe_{13} quasicrystal.

Khatyrkite is remarkable in that it contains micrometre-sized grains of icosahedrite, the first known naturally occurring quasicrystal—aperiodic and yet ordered in structure. The quasicrystal has a composition of Al_{63}Cu_{24}Fe_{13} which is close to that of a well-characterized synthetic Al-Cu-Fe material. It is thought that the icosahedrite, like the khatyrkite, was formed in space in a collision involving the parent body of the meteorite.

A second natural quasicrystal, called decagonite, Al_{71}Ni_{24}Fe_{5} with a decagonal structure has been identified by Luca Bindi in the samples and announced in 2015. Another variant was announced the following year.

Quasicrystals were first reported in 1984 and named so by Dov Levine and Paul Steinhardt. More than 100 quasicrystal compositions have been discovered by 2009—all synthesized in the laboratory. Steinhardt initiated a large-scale search for natural quasicrystals around the year of 2000 using the database of the International Centre for Diffraction Data. About 50 candidates were selected out of 9,000 minerals based on a set of parameters defined by the structure of the known quasicrystals. The corresponding samples were examined with X-ray diffraction and transmission electron microscopy but no quasicrystals were found. Widening of the search eventually included khatyrkite. A sample of the mineral was provided by Luca Bindi of the Museo di Firenze and was later proven to be part of the Russian holotype specimen. Mapping its chemical composition and crystalline structure revealed agglomerate of grains up to 0.1 millimeter in size of various phases, mostly khatyrkite, cupalite (zinc or iron containing), some yet unidentified Al-Cu-Fe minerals and the Al_{63}Cu_{24}Fe_{13} quasicrystal phase. The quasicrystal grains were of high crystalline quality equal to that of the best laboratory specimens, as demonstrated by the narrow diffraction peaks. The mechanism of their formation is yet uncertain. The specific composition of the accompanying minerals and the location where the sample was collected—far from any industrial activities—confirm that the discovered quasicrystal is of natural origin.
