= Kanatzidisite =

Sulfide mineral of bismuth and tellurium

General
- Category: Minerals
- Formula: (SbBiS_{3})_{2}Te_{2}
- IMA symbol: Ktz
- Strunz classification: 2.EB
- Crystal system: monoclinic
- Crystal class: P21/m
- Unit cell: a = 4.0021(5) Å, b = 3.9963(5) Å, c = 21.1009(10) Å β = 95.392(3)°

Identification
- Colour: black
- Luster: metallic
- Density: 5.481
- Birefringence: weak
- Pleochroism: gray to greenish gray

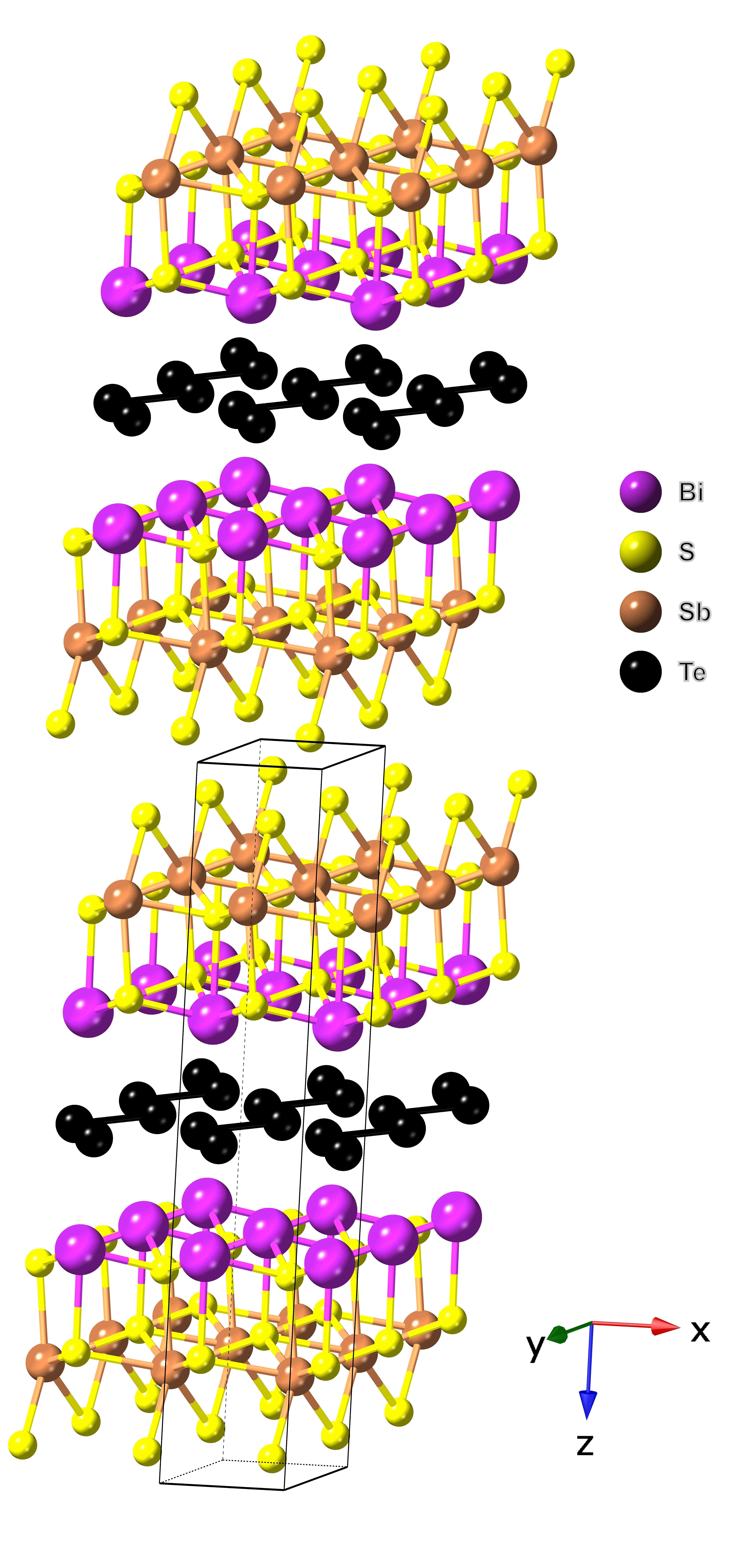
Crystal structure of kanatzidisite

Kanatzidisite is a mineral of the sulfosalt class with a composition of [BiSbS_{3}][Te_{2}]. It crystallizes in the monoclinic crystal system (space group: P2_{1}/m) with lattice constants a = 4.0021(5) Å, b = 3.9963(5) Å, c = 21.1009(10) Å and β = 95.392(3)°. Its structure features very unusual van der Waals heterolayers of alternating BiSbS_{3} double layers and atomically thin distorted [Te_{2}] square-net. Based on its calculated band structure, kanatzidisite may exhibit topological features characteristic of a Dirac semimetal. Associated minerals are arsenopyrite, pyrite, marcasite, sphalerite, chalcopyrite, gold, bismuth, bismuthinite, ikunolite, jonassonite, jaszczakite ([(Bi,Pb)_{3}S_{3}][AuS_{2}]) and cosalite in a quartz matrix. A mineral specimen was detected by Luca Bindi and is currently stored in the Museum of Natural History of the University of Florence in Italy. The name of kanatzidisite is after Mercouri Kanatzidis, a distinguished chemist who holds the position of Professor of Chemistry at Northwestern University and Senior Scientist at Argonne National Laboratory.
