= Komeutyuyam Range =

Mountain range in the Russian Far East

- Комеутюямский хребет
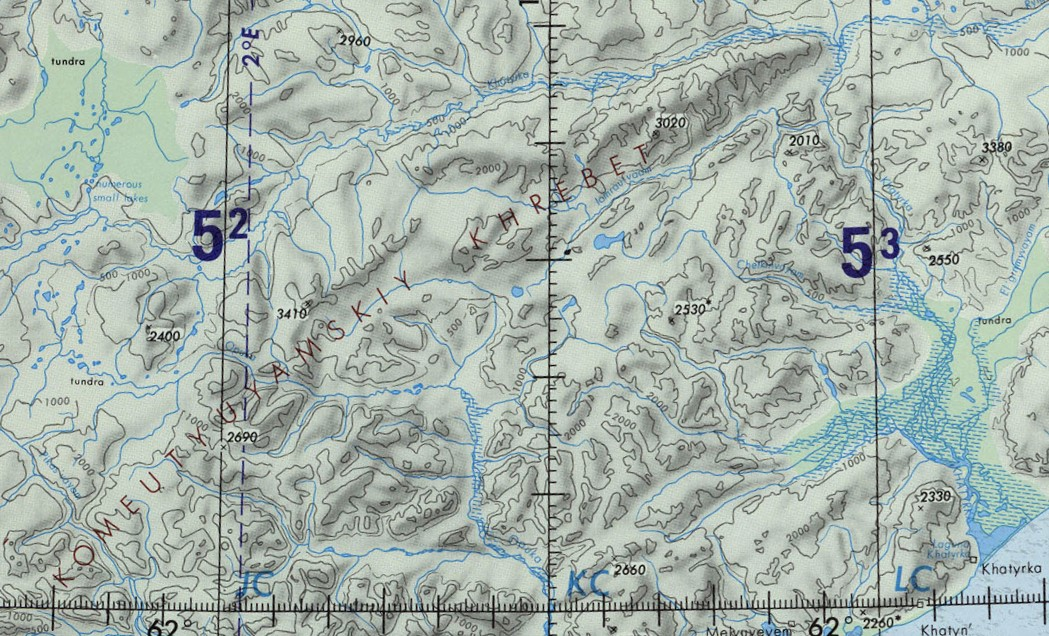
- Komeutyuyam Range ONC map section

Highest point
- Peak: Volokvyneitkon
- Elevation: 1,142.7 m (3,749 ft)

Dimensions
- Length: 150 km (93 mi) NE/SW
- Width: 40 km (25 mi) NW/SE

Geography
- Location within Chukotka Autonomous Okrug Location within Kamchatka Krai Location within Far Eastern Federal District
- Location: Chukotka Autonomous Okrug; Kamchatka Krai, Russia
- Range coordinates: 62°31′40″N 173°46′47″E
- Parent range: Koryak Highlands; East Siberian Mountains

Geology
- Orogeny: Alpine orogeny
- Rock age: Cretaceous

Climbing
- Easiest route: From Khatyrka

The Komeutyuyam Range (Russian: Комеутюямский хребет) is a range of mountains in Chukotka Autonomous Okrug and Kamchatka Krai, Russian Far East.

Administratively the northern section of the range belongs to the Anadyr District of Chukotka Autonomous Okrug, and the southern to Olyutorsky District of Kamchatka Krai.

== Geography ==
The Komeutyuyam Range is part of the Koryak Highland system. It stretches parallel to the Bering Sea coast, about 50 kilometres (31 mi) inland, in a NE/SW direction between the western end of the Ukvushvuynen Range in the north and the Pikas Range in the south. The valley of the Pikasvayam, the largest tributary of the Ukelayat, marks its southern end.

The highest point of the range is Mt Volokvyneitkon (гора Волоквынейткон) — or Mt Valvykvyneitkon (гора Валвыквынейткон), a 1,142 metres (3,747 ft) high peak, located in the southwestern sector of the range, near the limit between Chukotka Autonomous Okrug and Kamchatka Krai. The same peak has a height of 1,144 metres (3,753 ft) in the Topographic USSR Chart.

Rivers Opuka and Iomrautvaam have their sources in the southern slopes of the Komeutyuyam and the Khatyrka flows along the northern slopes and bends southeastwards at the northeastern end of the range.

== See also ==
- Bering tundra
- Khatyrka meteorite
- List of mountains and hills of Russia
