= Lucabindiite =

Mineral discovered in 1998 from the La Fossa crater

- Colorless and white microcrystals of lucabindiite from the La Fossa Crater

General
- Category: Arsenic minerals
- Formula: (K,NH4)As4O6(Cl,Br)
- IMA symbol: Lbd
- Crystal system: Hexagonal
- Space group: P6/mmm
- Unit cell: a = 5.2386(7) Å, c = 9.014(2) Å

Identification
- Color: Colorless to white
- Cleavage: No cleavage
- Fracture: No fracture
- Tenacity: Brittle
- Luster: Vitreous
- Streak: White
- Density: 3.68 g/cm^{3} (calculated measurement)
- Ultraviolet fluorescence: Not fluorescent

Lucabindiite is a mineral discovered in 1998 from the La Fossa crater at Vulcano, the Aeolian islands off the coast of Italy. It has the chemical formula (K,NH4)As4O6(Cl,Br) and is hexagonal. After months of collecting sublimates and encrustations, the researchers discovered lucabindiite which was found on the surface of pyroclastic breccia. The mineral is named after Luca Bindi, who was a professor of mineralogy and former head of the Division of Mineralogy of the Natural History Museum of the University of Florence.

== Occurrence and physical properties ==
The researchers discovered a minute amount of crystals of lucabindiite, therefore they could not perform a direct measurement of the refractive index. However, two other methods, Mandarino method (1981) and Korotkov–Atuchin method (2008), were used to estimate the average refractive index. These values are 1.92 and 1.88, respectively. The small amount they obtained made it difficult or impossible to measure other physical properties. The density was calculated at 3.68 g/cm^{3}. The mineral is very brittle, shows no signs of cleavage, parting or fracture patterns, and hardness was not determined. Lucabindiite is formed by the occurrence of steam of hydrogen halogenides, and arsenic. Lucabiindite is also found in conjunction with arsenolite, K and NH_{4} halides, orpiment, realgar, kirkiite, and vurroite. Lucabindiite has a structure containing (001) layers of neutral As_{2}O_{3} sheets. Each sheet is formed by pyramids and is connected by a shared interlayer oxygen.

== Chemical and spectroscopic studies ==
Lucabindiite has the chemical formula (K,NH4)As4O6(Cl,Br). A quantitative analysis was performed using energy dispersive spectroscopy due to the small sample size of 100 μm smeared on a 30 nm thick film of carbon. The chemical formula obtained from this method is [(K_{0.51}(NH_{4})_{0.49}]_{Σ1.00}As_{4.00}O_{5.93}(Cl_{0.48}Br_{0.40}F_{0.19})_{Σ1.07} on the basis of 7 anions. The presence of ammonium was confirmed using the structure refinement and Fourier-transform infrared spectroscopy. X-ray powder diffraction was performed on lucabindiite and the values calculated are: a = 5.2372(2)Å, c = 9.0085(7)Å, V = 213.98(2)Å^{3}.

== See also ==
- List of minerals named after people
