= Polarizable vacuum =

Theory of gravity

- Claims: Gravitation can be described via a scalar theory of gravitation, using a stratified conformally flat metric, in which the field equation arises from the notion that the vacuum behaves like an optical polarizable medium.
- Related scientific disciplines: physics
- Year proposed: 1957 (R. H. Dicke), 1998 (H. E. Puthoff)
- Original proponents: Robert Dicke, Harold E. Puthoff
- Subsequent proponents: Harold E. Puthoff (see also Bernard Haisch and SED)

In theoretical physics, particularly fringe physics, polarizable vacuum (PV) and its associated theory refer to proposals by Harold E. Puthoff, Robert H. Dicke, and others to develop an analog of general relativity to describe gravity and its relationship to electromagnetism.

== Description ==
In essence, Dicke and Puthoff proposed that the presence of mass alters the electric permittivity and the magnetic permeability of flat spacetime, ε_{o} and μ_{o} respectively by multiplying them by a scalar function, K:

$$\varepsilon_0\to\varepsilon=K\varepsilon_0\;;\;\mu_0\to\mu=K\mu_0$$

arguing that this will affect the lengths of rulers made of ordinary matter so that in the presence of a gravitational field, the spacetime metric of Minkowski spacetime is replaced by

$$ds^2 = -\frac{1}{\kappa^2} dt^2 + \kappa^2 \, ( dx^2 + dy^2 + dz^2)$$

where $\kappa^2 = K$ is the so-called "dielectric constant of the vacuum". This is a "diagonal" metric given in terms of a Cartesian chart and having the same stratified conformally flat form in the Watt-Misner theory of gravitation. However, according to Dicke and Puthoff, κ must satisfy a field equation that differs from the field equation of the Watt-Misner theory. In the case of a static spherically symmetric vacuum, this yields the asymptotically flat solution

$$\kappa = \exp(m/r) = 1 + m/r + O\left( \frac{1}{r^2} \right)$$

The resulting Lorentzian spacetime agrees with the analogous solution in the Watt-Misner theory. It has the same weak-field limit and far-field as the Schwarzschild vacuum solution in general relativity. It satisfies three of the four classical tests of relativistic gravitation (redshift, deflection of light, precession of the perihelion of Mercury) to within the limit of observational accuracy. However, as shown by Ibison (2003), it yields a different prediction for the inspiral of test particles due to gravitational radiation.

However, requiring stratified-conformally flat metrics rules out the possibility of recovering the weak-field Kerr metric and is certainly inconsistent with the claim that PV can give a general "approximation" of the general theory of relativity. In particular, this theory exhibits no frame-dragging effects. Also, the impact of gravitational radiation on test particles differs profoundly between scalar theories and tensor theories of gravitation, such as general relativity. LIGO is not intended primarily as a test ruling out scalar theories. However, it is widely expected to do so as a side benefit once it detects unambiguous gravitational wave signals exhibiting the characteristics expected in general relativity.

Ibison has considered a "cosmological solution" of PV, analogous to the Friedmann dust solution with flat orthogonal hyperslices in general relativity, and argues that this model is inconsistent with various observational and theoretical constraints. He also finds a rate of inspiral disagreeing with observation. The latter result disagrees with that of Watt and Misner, whose Lorentzian manifold differs from PV in the case of cosmology.

Contrary to Puthoff's claims, it is widely accepted that no scalar theory of gravitation can reproduce all of general relativity's successes. It might be noted that De Felice uses constitutive relations to obtain a susceptibility tensor which lives in spatial hyperslices; this provides extra degrees of freedom, which help make up for the degree of freedom lacking in PV and other scalar theories.

== Criticism ==
Puthoff himself has offered various characterizations of his proposal, which has been variously characterized as

- an attempt to reformulate general relativity in terms of a purely formal analogy with the propagation of light through an optical medium,
- an attempt to replace general relativity with a scalar theory of gravitation featuring formal analogies with Maxwell's theory of electromagnetism,
- an attempt to unify gravitation and electromagnetism in a theory of electrogravity,
- an attempt to provide a physical mechanism for how spacetime gets curved in general relativity, which suggests (to Puthoff) the possibility of "metric engineering" for such purposes as spacecraft propulsion (see Breakthrough Propulsion Physics Program).

PV has origins in more mainstream work by such physicists as Robert Dicke. Still, in current parlance, the term does appear to be most closely associated with the speculations of Puthoff. The claims have not been accepted in mainstream physics.

Mainstream physicists agree that PV is

1. not viable as a unification of gravitation and electromagnetism
2. not a "reformulation" of general relativity,
3. not a viable theory of gravitation since it violates observational and theoretical requirements.

== Related work ==
Antecedents of PV and more recent related proposals include the following:

1. A proposal in 1921 by H. A. Wilson to reduce gravitation to electromagnetism by pursuing the formal analogy between "light bending" in metric theories of gravitation and propagation of light through an optical medium having a spatially varying refractive index. Wilson's approach to a unified field theory is not considered viable today.
2. An attempt (roughly 1960–1970) by Robert Dicke and Fernando de Felice to resurrect and improve Wilson's idea of an optical analog of gravitational effects. If interpreted conservatively as an attempt to provide an alternative approach to GTR rather than as a work toward a theory unifying electromagnetism and gravitation, this approach is not unreasonable, although most likely of rather limited utility.
3. The 1967 proposal of Andrei Sakharov that gravitation might arise from underlying quantum field theory effects in a manner somewhat analogous to the way that the (simple) classical theory of elasticity arises from (complicated) particle physics. This work is generally regarded as mainstream and not entirely implausible but highly speculative, and most physicists seem to feel that little progress has been made.
4. In a series of papers, Bernard Haisch and Alfonso Rueda have proposed that the inertia of massive objects arises as a "electromagnetic reaction force", due to interaction with the so-called zero point field. According to mainstream physics, their claims rely on incorrect quantum field theory computations.
5. Recent work, motivated in large part by the discoveries of the Unruh effect, Hawking radiation, and black hole thermodynamics, to work out a complete theory of physical analogs such as optical black holes. This is not work toward a unified field theory, but in another sense, can be regarded as work towards an even more ambitious unification, in which some of the most famous effects usually ascribed to general relativity (but familiar to many metric theories of gravitation) would be seen as essentially thermodynamical effects, not specifically gravitational effects. This work has excited great interest because it might enable experimental verification of the basic concept of Hawking radiation, which is widely regarded as one of the most revolutionary proposals in twentieth-century physics but which, in its gravitational incarnation, seems impossible to verify in experiments in earthly laboratories.
6. The 1999 proposal by Keith Watt and Charles W. Misner of a scalar theory of gravitation which postulates a stratified conformally flat metric of the form $ds^2 = -\exp(2 \, \phi) + \exp(-2 \phi) (dx^2+dy^2+dz^2$, given with respect to a Cartesian chart, where φ satisfies a certain partial differential equation which reduces in a vacuum region to the flat spacetime wave equation $\Box \phi = 0$. This is a "toy theory", not a fully fledged theory of gravitation, since as Watt and Misner pointed out, while this theory does have the correct Newtonian limit, it disagrees with the result of certain observations.
7. Matthew R. Edwards suggests that the gravito-optical medium is composed of gravitons and may, in turn, connect with the polarizable vacuum approach.

== See also ==
- Induced gravity (for Sakharov's proposal)
- Maxwell's equations in curved spacetime
- Electromagnetic stress-energy tensor
- Vacuum polarization
