= Albert Einstein Professorship in Science =

Endowed professorship at Princeton university

The Albert Einstein Professorship in Science is an endowed professorship in physics established at Princeton University in 1974 by a donation from the International Business Machine Corporation (IBM).

Albert Einstein was never on the faculty of Princeton University, although in the early 1930s he did occupy a corner office in Princeton University's mathematics building, the old Fine Hall, which served as the temporary headquarters of the Institute for Advanced Study, while its permanent facility was being built.

Princeton University's Albert Einstein Professorship in Science should not be confused with various other Einstein professorships, such as Stony Brook University's Albert Einstein Professorship of Physics, which was held by C. N. Yang.

== Recipients ==
All three of the holders of the professorship have received numerous awards and honors and have been elected to the United States National Academy of Sciences (Dicke in 1967, Peebles in 1988, and Steinhardt in 1998). Peebles won the Nobel Prize in Physics in 2019.

Holders of the Albert Einstein Professorship have been:

- Robert H. Dicke (1975–1984)
- P. J. E. Peebles (1984–2000)
- Paul J. Steinhardt (2000–present)
