= Stibarsen =

Native element mineral

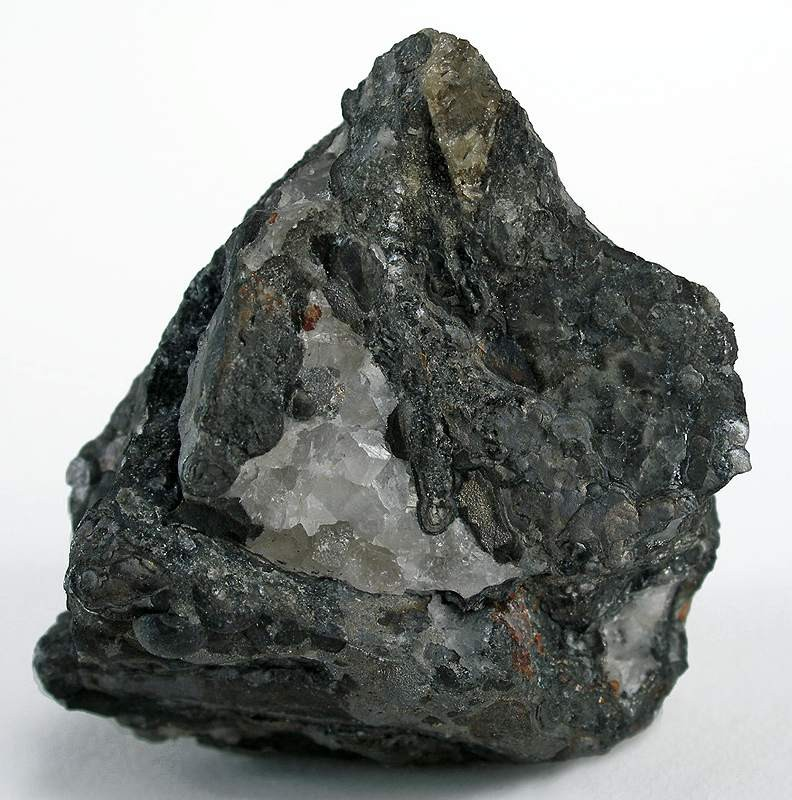
- Size: 4.7 × 3.3 × 3.3 cm

General
- Category: Arsenic minerals
- Formula: AsSb
- IMA symbol: Sbr
- Crystal system: Trigonal
- Crystal class: Hexagonal scalenohedral (3̅m); H-M symbol: (3̅ 2/m)
- Space group: R3̅m (No. 166); Pearson symbol: hR6
- Unit cell: a = 4.045, c = 10.961 [Å], Z = 6

Identification
- Color: White, gray, grayish white, reddish white
- Crystal habit: Reniform ("kidney like")
- Cleavage: Perfect
- Mohs scale hardness: 3–4
- Luster: Metallic
- Streak: grayish-black
- Diaphaneity: Opaque
- Specific gravity: 5.8–6.2 (meas.); 6.37 (calc.)
- Other characteristics: Non-fluorescent, nonmagnetic

Stibarsen or allemontite is a natural form of arsenic antimonide (AsSb) or antimony arsenide (SbAs). The name stibarsen is derived from Latin stibium (antimony) and arsenic, whereas allemontite refers to the locality Allemont in France where the mineral was discovered. It is found in veins at Allemont, Isère, France; Valtellina, Italy; and the Comstock Lode, United States; and in a lithium pegmatites at Varuträsk, Sweden. Stibarsen is often mixed with pure arsenic or antimony, and the original description in 1941 proposed to use stibarsen for AsSb and allemontite for the mixtures. Since 1982, the International Mineralogical Association considers stibarsen as the correct mineral name.

== Structure ==
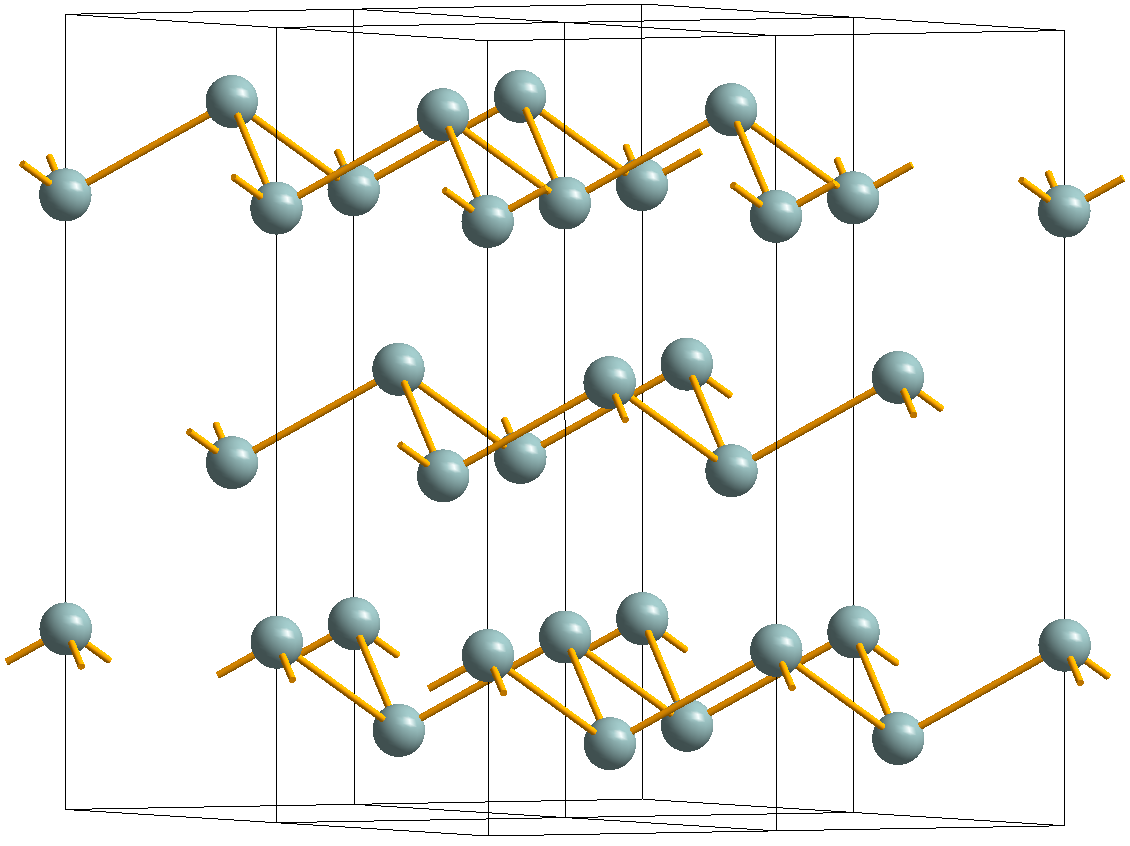
Crystal structure common to As, Sb and AsSb

Stibarsen has the same crystal structure as arsenic and antimony, with the intermediate values of the lattice parameters. This structure (space group R3̅m No. 166) is variably described as hexagonal, trigonal and rhombohedral because of the overlap between these terms (see trigonal crystal system). Simulation of the X-ray diffraction intensities reveals that the Sb and As atoms form ordered (or partly ordered) sublattices in SbAs. The atoms are arranged in warped graphite-like sheets, which extend normal to the c axis. Weak bonding between the sheets accounts for the relatively low hardness of As, Sb and AsSb.

Mineral	a (nm)	c (nm)	ρ (g/cm^{3})	ref.
As	0.376	1.055	5.78	
AsSb	0.4025	1.084	6.37	
Sb	0.43056	1.125	6.72	
