= Jim Peebles =

Canadian-American astrophysicist and cosmologist (born 1935)

Jim Peebles CC OM FRS
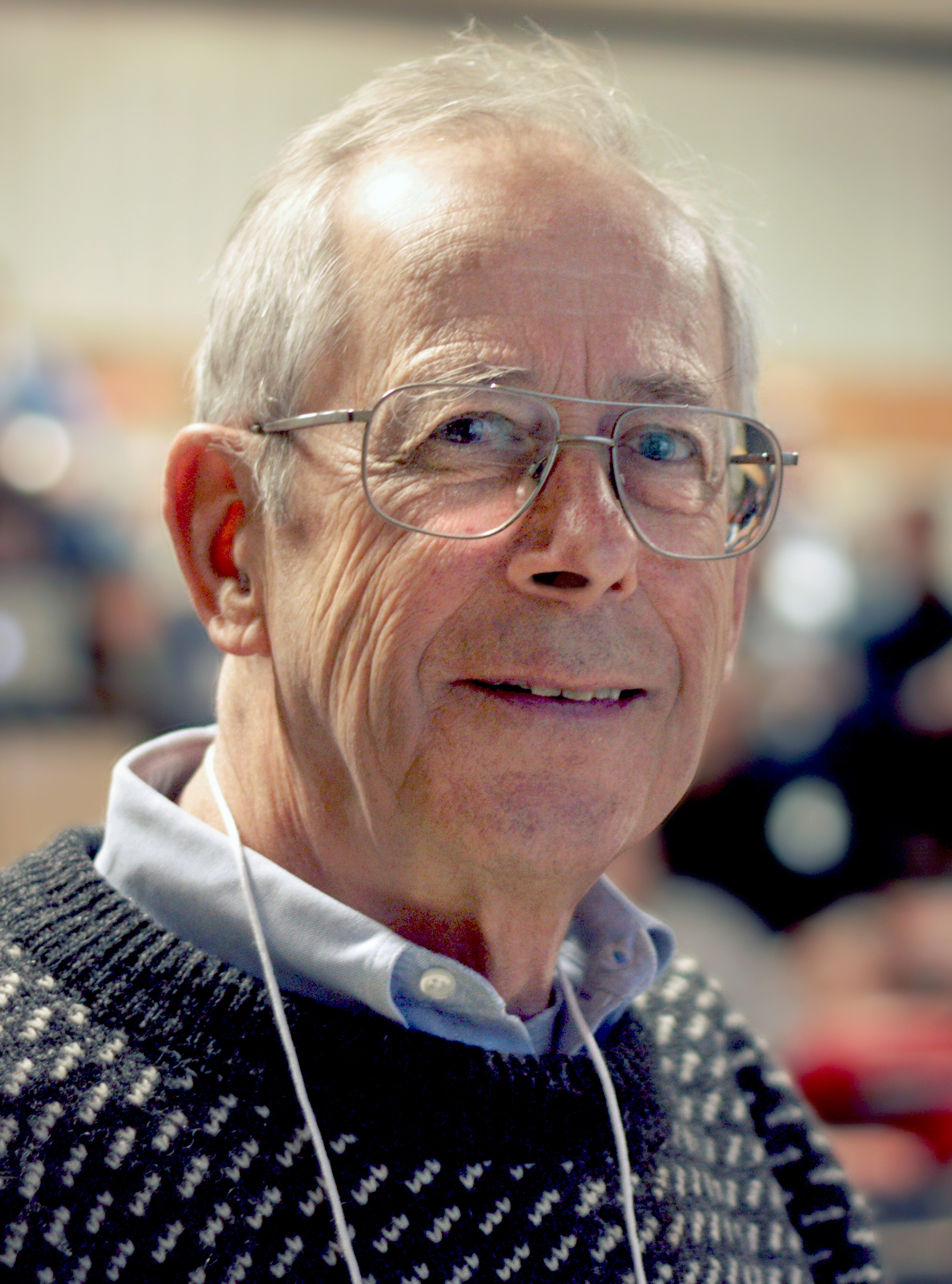
- Peebles in 2010
- Born: Phillip James Edwin Peebles; April 25, 1935 (age 91); Winnipeg, Manitoba, Canada
- Citizenship: Canadian, American
- Education: University of Manitoba (BS); Princeton University (MS, PhD)
- Known for: Cosmic microwave background radiation Cosmic infrared background Cold dark matter Lyman-alpha emitter Primordial isocurvature baryon model Quintessence; Recombination; Ostriker–Peebles criterion
- Spouse: Alison Peebles (m. 1958)
- Children: 3
- Awards: Eddington Medal (1981); Heineman Prize (1982); Bruce Medal (1995); Gold Medal of the Royal Astronomical Society (1998); Gruber Prize (2000); Harvey Prize (2001); Shaw Prize (2004); Crafoord Prize (2005); Dirac Medal (2013); Order of Manitoba (2017); Nobel Prize in Physics (2019)
- Scientific career
- Fields: Theoretical physics Physical cosmology
- Workplaces: Princeton University; Institute for Advanced Study
- Thesis: Observational tests and theoretical problems relating to the conjecture that the strength of the electromagnetic interaction may be variable (1962)
- Doctoral advisor: Robert Dicke
- Doctoral students: Margaret J. Geller; Stuart L. Shapiro

Phillip James Edwin Peebles CC OM FRS (born April 25, 1935) is a Canadian-American astrophysicist, astronomer, and theoretical cosmologist who gained the Albert Einstein Professorship in Science, emeritus, at Princeton University. He is widely regarded as one of the world's leading theoretical cosmologists in the period since 1970, with major theoretical contributions to primordial nucleosynthesis, dark matter, the cosmic microwave background, and structure formation.

Peebles was awarded half of the Nobel Prize in Physics in 2019 for his theoretical discoveries in physical cosmology. He shared the prize with Michel Mayor and Didier Queloz for their discovery of an exoplanet orbiting a sun-like star. While much of his work relates to the development of the universe from its first few seconds, he is more skeptical about what we can know about the very beginning, and stated, "It's very unfortunate that one thinks of the beginning whereas in fact, we have no good theory of such a thing as the beginning."

Peebles has described himself as a convinced agnostic.

== Early life ==
Peebles was born on April 25, 1935, in St. Vital in present-day Winnipeg, Manitoba, Canada, the son of Ada Marion (Green), a homemaker, and Andrew Charles Peebles, who worked for the Winnipeg Grain Exchange. He completed his Bachelor of Science at the University of Manitoba. He then went on to pursue graduate studies at Princeton University, where he received his Doctor of Philosophy degree in physics in 1962, completing a doctoral dissertation titled "Observational Tests and Theoretical Problems Relating to the Conjecture That the Strength of the Electromagnetic Interaction May Be Variable" under the supervision of Robert Dicke. He remained at Princeton for his whole career. Peebles was a Member in the School of Natural Sciences at the Institute for Advanced Study during the academic year 1977–78; he made subsequent visits during 1990–91 and 1998–99.

== Academic career ==
Most of Peebles's work since 1964 has been in the field of physical cosmology to determine the origins of the universe. In 1964, there was very little interest in this field and it was considered a "dead end" but Peebles remained committed to studying it. Peebles has made many important contributions to the Big Bang model. In 1965, Peebles, with Dicke and two other Princeton physicists, connected the cosmic microwave background radiation discovered by Arno Allan Penzias and Robert Woodrow Wilson to a plasma cooling event in the early universe. This connection created a sensation leading to wide acceptance of the Big Bang model among astronomers and physicists. Peebles then used the temperature of that radiation, 3K, to compute the first accurate estimate of primordial elemental abundance based on nuclear physics and cosmic expansion, a model called Big Bang nucleosynthesis.

Along with making major contributions to dark matter, and dark energy, he was the leading pioneer in the theory of cosmic structure formation in the 1970s. Long before it was considered a serious, quantitative branch of physics, Peebles was studying physical cosmology and has done much to establish its respectability. Peebles said, "It was not a single step, some critical discovery that suddenly made cosmology relevant but the field gradually emerged through a number of experimental observations. Clearly one of the most important during my career was the detection of the cosmic microwave background (CMB) radiation that immediately attracted attention [...] both experimentalists interested in measuring the properties of this radiation and theorists, who joined in analyzing the implications". His Shaw Prize citation states "He laid the foundations for almost all modern investigations in cosmology, both theoretical and observational, transforming a highly speculative field into a precision science."

Peebles has a long record of innovating the basic ideas, which would be extensively studied later by other scientists. For instance, in 1987, he proposed the primordial isocurvature baryon model for the development of the early universe. Similarly, Peebles contributed to establishing the dark matter problem in the early 1970s. Peebles is also known for the Ostriker–Peebles criterion, relating to the stability of galactic formation.

Peebles's body of work was recognized with him being named a 2019 Nobel Laureate in Physics, "for theoretical discoveries in physical cosmology"; Peebles shared half the prize with Michel Mayor and Didier Queloz who had been the first to discover an exoplanet around a main sequence star.

Peebles was elected as a member of the American Academy of Arts and Sciences in 1977 and a member of the National Academy of Sciences in 1988.

== Honours ==
Awards

- Fellow of the American Physical Society (1964)
- Eddington Medal (1981)
- Heineman Prize (1982)
- Fellow of the Royal Society (1982)
- Henry Norris Russell Lectureship (1993)
- Bruce Medal (1995)
- Oskar Klein Medal (1997)
- Gold Medal of the Royal Astronomical Society (1998)
- Gruber Prize in Cosmology (2000), with Allan Sandage
- Harvey Prize (2001)
- Shaw Prize (2004)
- Member of the American Philosophical Society (2004)
- Crafoord Prize with James E. Gunn and Martin Rees (2005)
- Hitchcock Professorship (2006)
- Dirac Medal (2013)
- Member of the Order of Manitoba (2017)
- Nobel Prize in Physics (2019)
- Elected a Legacy Fellow of the American Astronomical Society in 2020.
- Named by the Carnegie Corporation of New York as an honoree of the Great Immigrants Award in 2021.
- Golden Plate Award of the American Academy of Achievement (2024)

Named after him

- Asteroid 18242 Peebles

== Publications ==
- Peebles, P.J.E. (1971). Physical Cosmology. Princeton University Press.
- Peebles, P.J.E. (1980). Large-Scale Structure of the Universe. Princeton University Press.
- Peebles, P.J.E. (1992). Quantum Mechanics (1st Printing ed.). Princeton University Press.
- Peebles, P.J.E. (1993). Principles of Physical Cosmology (n ed.). Princeton University Press.
- Peebles, P.J.E. (2009). Finding the Big Bang (1st ed.). Cambridge University Press.
- Peebles, P.J.E. (2020). Cosmology's Century. Princeton University Press.
- Peebles, P.J.E. (2022). The Whole Truth. Princeton University Press.
