= Robert H. Dicke =

American astronomer and physicist (1916–1997)

- Born: Robert Henry Dicke; May 6, 1916; St. Louis, Missouri, U.S.
- Died: March 4, 1997 (aged 80); Princeton, New Jersey, U.S.
- Education: Princeton University (B.S.); University of Rochester (Ph.D)
- Known for: Inventing the lock-in amplifier Brans–Dicke theory Dicke–Nordtvedt effect Dicke model Dicke effect Dicke radiometer Dicke state Dicke switch Lamb Dicke regime Anthropic principle Flatness problem Magic tee Polarizable vacuum Scattering parameters Superradiance; VSL theory of gravity Coining the term "black hole"
- Spouse: Annie Currie (m. 1942)
- Children: 3
- Awards: Richtmyer Memorial Award (1967); Rumford Prize (1967); National Medal of Science (1970); Comstock Prize in Physics (1973); Elliott Cresson Medal (1974); Michelson–Morley Award (1987); Beatrice M. Tinsley Prize (1992)
- Scientific career
- Fields: Physics
- Workplaces: Princeton University
- Doctoral advisor: Lee Alvin DuBridge

Robert Henry Dicke (/ˈdɪki/; May 6, 1916 – March 4, 1997) was an American astronomer and physicist who made important contributions to the fields of astrophysics, atomic physics, cosmology and gravity. He was the Albert Einstein Professor in Science at Princeton University (1975–1984).

== Biography ==
Born in St. Louis, Missouri, Dicke completed his bachelor's degree at Princeton University and his doctorate, in 1939, from the University of Rochester in nuclear physics. During the Second World War he worked in the Radiation Laboratory at the Massachusetts Institute of Technology where he worked on the development of radar and designed the Dicke radiometer, a microwave receiver. He used this to set a limit on the temperature of the microwave background radiation, from the roof of the Radiation Laboratory, of less than 20 kelvins.

In 1946, he returned to Princeton University, where he remained for the remainder of his career. He did some work in atomic physics, particularly on the laser and measuring the gyromagnetic ratio of the electron. An important contribution to the field of spectroscopy and radiative transfer was his prediction of the phenomenon called Dicke narrowing: When the mean free path of an atom is much smaller than the wavelength of one of its radiation transitions, the atom changes velocity and direction many times during the emission or absorption of a photon. This causes an averaging over different Doppler states and results in an atomic linewidth that is much narrower than the Doppler width. Dicke narrowing occurs at relatively low pressures in the millimeter wave and microwave regions (where it is used in atomic clocks to improve precision). Dicke narrowing is analogous to the Mössbauer effect for gamma rays.

In 1956, approximately two years before Charles Hard Townes and Arthur Leonard Schawlow filed their patent application, Dicke filed a patent titled "Molecular Amplification Generation Systems and Methods" with claims of how to build an infrared laser and the use of an open resonator and the patent was awarded on September 9, 1958.

He spent the remainder of his career developing a program of precision tests of general relativity using the framework of the equivalence principle. In 1957, he first proposed an alternative theory of gravitation inspired by Mach's principle and Paul Dirac's large numbers hypothesis. In 1961, this led to the Brans–Dicke theory of gravitation, developed with Carl H. Brans, an equivalence-principle violating modification of general relativity. A highlight experiment was the test of the equivalence principle by Roll, Krotkov and Dicke, which was a factor of 100 more accurate than previous work. He also made measurements of solar oblateness which were useful in understanding the perihelion precession of Mercury's orbit, one of the classical tests of general relativity.

Dirac had hypothesized that because the gravitational constant G is very roughly equal to the inverse age of the universe in certain units, then G must vary to maintain this equality. Dicke realized that Dirac's relation could be a selection effect: fundamental physical laws connect G to the lifetime of what are called main sequence stars, such as the Sun, and these stars, according to Dicke, are necessary for the existence of life. At any other epoch, when the equality did not hold, there would be no intelligent life around to notice the discrepancy. This was the first modern application of what is now called the weak anthropic principle.

In the early 1960s, work on Brans–Dicke theory led Dicke to think about the early Universe, and with Jim Peebles he re-derived the prediction of a cosmic microwave background (having allegedly forgotten the earlier prediction of George Gamow and co-workers). Dicke, with David Todd Wilkinson and Peter G. Roll, immediately began building a Dicke radiometer to search for the radiation. They were preceded by the accidental detection made by Arno Penzias and Robert Woodrow Wilson (also using a Dicke radiometer), who were working at Bell Labs near Princeton. Nevertheless, Dicke's group made the second clean detection, and their theoretical interpretation of Penzias and Wilson's results showed that theories of the early universe had moved from pure speculation into well-tested physics.

In 1970, Dicke argued that the universe must have very nearly the critical density of matter needed to stop it expanding forever. Standard models of the universe pass through stages dominated by radiation, matter, curvature etc. Transitions between stages are very special cosmic times which a priori could differ by many orders of magnitude. Since there is a non-negligible amount of matter, either we are coincidentally living close to the transition to or from the matter-dominated stage, or we are in the middle of it; the latter is preferred since the coincidences are highly unlikely (an application of the Copernican principle). This implies a negligible curvature, so the universe must have almost critical density. This has been called the "Dicke coincidence" argument. In fact it gives the wrong answer, since we seem to be living at the time of transition between the matter and dark energy stages. An anthropic explanation of the failure of Dicke's argument was given by Weinberg.

Dicke was also responsible for developing the lock-in amplifier, which is an indispensable tool in the area of applied science and engineering. Many of Dicke's experiments capitalize on lock-in in some way or another. However, in an interview with Martin Harwit he claims that even though he is often credited with the invention of the device; he believes he read about it in a review of scientific equipment written by Walter C. Michels, a professor at Bryn Mawr.

Dicke is also credited with the invention of a kind of radio receiver, called a "Dicke Radiometric Receiver" or simply "Dicke Radiometer", developed by Dicke during WWII. His radiometer was characterized by a noise temperature calibration technique using a switchable resistor, known as "Dicke Resistor".

Dicke was awarded the 1970 National Medal of Science. In 1973, he was awarded the Comstock Prize in Physics from the National Academy of Sciences, of which he was a member. He was also a member of the American Academy of Arts and Sciences and the American Philosophical Society. Dicke was nominated for the Nobel Prize in Physics multiple times. Peebles ended his own 2019 Nobel Lecture with a statement of disappointment that Dicke had never been awarded the prize, then said, "But I am satisfied now because my Nobel Prize is closure of what Bob set in motion, his great goal of establishing an empirically based gravity physics, by the establishment of the empirically-based relativistic cosmology."

== Marriage and family life ==
Dicke married Annie Currie in 1942. Currie, of Scottish descent, was born in Barrow-in-Furness in England in 1920 and as a young girl immigrated to Rochester, New York, via Australia and New Zealand, of which Annie had very fond memories.

At the beginning of World War II, Dicke was asked to assist the war effort by applying his skills to the development of radar with the Massachusetts Institute of Technology.

At the end of the war, Dicke and Currie moved to Princeton, New Jersey, where Robert was on the faculty at Princeton University. Dicke died there March 4, 1997. Currie continued to live in Princeton until 2002. For the last years of her life she lived in Hightstown, New Jersey at Meadow Lakes Retirement Community until her death in 2005.

They had one daughter, Nancy born in 1945, and two sons, John born in 1946 and James born in 1953. At the time of Dicke's death they had six grandchildren and a great grandchild.

== Bibliography ==
- Dicke, RH (April 1981). "Seismology and geodesy of the sun: Low-frequency oscillations". Proc. Natl. Acad. Sci. U.S.A. 78 (4): 1989–1993. Bibcode:1981PNAS...78.1989D. doi:10.1073/pnas.78.4.1989. PMC 319267. PMID 16592998.
- Dicke, RH (March 1981). "Seismology and geodesy of the sun: Solar geodesy". Proc. Natl. Acad. Sci. U.S.A. 78 (3): 1309–1312. Bibcode:1981PNAS...78.1309D. doi:10.1073/pnas.78.3.1309. PMC 319117. PMID 16592985.
- Dicke, RH (April 26, 1974). "The Oblateness of the Sun and Relativity". Science. 184 (4135): 419–429. Bibcode:1974Sci...184..419D. doi:10.1126/science.184.4135.419. PMID 17736508.
- Dicke, RH (August 25, 1967). "Solar Models". Science. 157 (3791): 960. Bibcode:1967Sci...157..960D. doi:10.1126/science.157.3791.960. PMID 17792834.
- Dicke, RH (November 9, 1962). "The Earth and Cosmology: The earth may be affected by the distant matter of the universe through a long-range interaction". Science. 138 (3541): 653–664. Bibcode:1962Sci...138..653D. doi:10.1126/science.138.3541.653. PMID 17829699.
- Dicke, RH (March 6, 1959). "New Research on Old Gravitation: Are the observed physical constants independent of the position, epoch, and velocity of the laboratory?". Science. 129 (3349): 621–624. Bibcode:1959Sci...129..621D. doi:10.1126/science.129.3349.621. PMID 17735811.
- Dicke, RH (1946). "The measurement of thermal radiation at microwave frequencies". Review of Scientific Instruments. 17 (7): 268–275. Bibcode:1946RScI...17..268D. doi:10.1063/1.1770483. PMID 20991753. S2CID 26658623.

== Sources ==
- Kuhn J. R.; Libbrecht K. G.; Dicke R. H. (1988). "The surface temperature of the sun and changes in the solar constant". Science. 242 (4880): 908. Bibcode:1988Sci...242..908K. doi:10.1126/science.242.4880.908. S2CID 128820028.
- Williams J. G.; Dicke R. H.; Bender P. L.; Alley C. O.; Currie D. G.; Carter W. E.; Eckhardt D. H.; Faller J. E.; Kaula W. M.; et al. (1976). "New test of the equivalence principle from lunar laser ranging". Phys. Rev. Lett. 36 (11): 551. Bibcode:1976PhRvL..36..551W. doi:10.1103/PhysRevLett.36.551.
- Peebles P. J. E.; Dicke R. H. (1968). "Origin of the Globular Star Clusters". Astrophys. J. 154: 891. Bibcode:1968ApJ...154..891P. doi:10.1086/149811.
- Dicke R. H. (1962). "Mach's Principle And Invariance Under Transformation Of Units". Phys. Rev. 125 (6): 2163. Bibcode:1962PhRv..125.2163D. doi:10.1103/PhysRev.125.2163.
