= Ostriker–Peebles criterion =

In astronomy, the Ostriker–Peebles criterion, named after its discoverers Jeremiah Ostriker and Jim Peebles, describes the formation of barred galaxies.

The rotating disc of a spiral galaxy, consisting of stars and solar systems, may become unstable in a way that the stars in the outer parts of the "arms" are released from the galaxy system, resulting in the collapse of the remaining stars into a bar-shaped galaxy. This occurs in approximately 1/3 of the known spiral galaxies.

Based on the first kinetic energy component T and the total gravitational energy W, a galaxy will become barred when $\frac{T}{W} > 0.15$.
