= Primordial isocurvature baryon model =

A primordial isocurvature baryon model (PIB model) is a theoretical model describing the development of the early universe. It may be contrasted with the cold dark matter model (CDM model). The PIB model was proposed in 1987 by Jim Peebles as an alternative to the CDM model, which does not necessitate the existence of exotic dark matter. PIB models, which ascribe all cosmic density perturbations to isocurvature modes, predict results that are inconsistent with the observational data.

== See also ==
- Lambda-CDM model

== Bibliography ==
- Bucher, Martin; Moodley, Kavilan Moodley; Turok, Neil (2000). "Characterising the Primordial Cosmic Perturbations". Physical Review D. 66 (2). arXiv:astro-ph/0007360. Bibcode:2002PhRvD..66b3528B. doi:10.1103/PhysRevD.66.023528. S2CID 119424590.
- Hu, Wayne (1994). "The Nature versus Nurture of Anisotropies". In Krauss, Lawrence M. (ed.). CMB Anisotropies Two Years after COBE: Observations, Theory and the Future, Proceedings of the 1994 CWRU workshop held at the Case Western Reserve University, Cleveland, Ohio, 22-24 April 1994. World Scientific. p. 188. arXiv:astro-ph/9406071. Bibcode:1994caty.conf..188H. ISBN 978-981-4549-93-6.
