= Khatyrka =

Khatyrka Хатырка Ватыркан (Chukchi)
- Selo
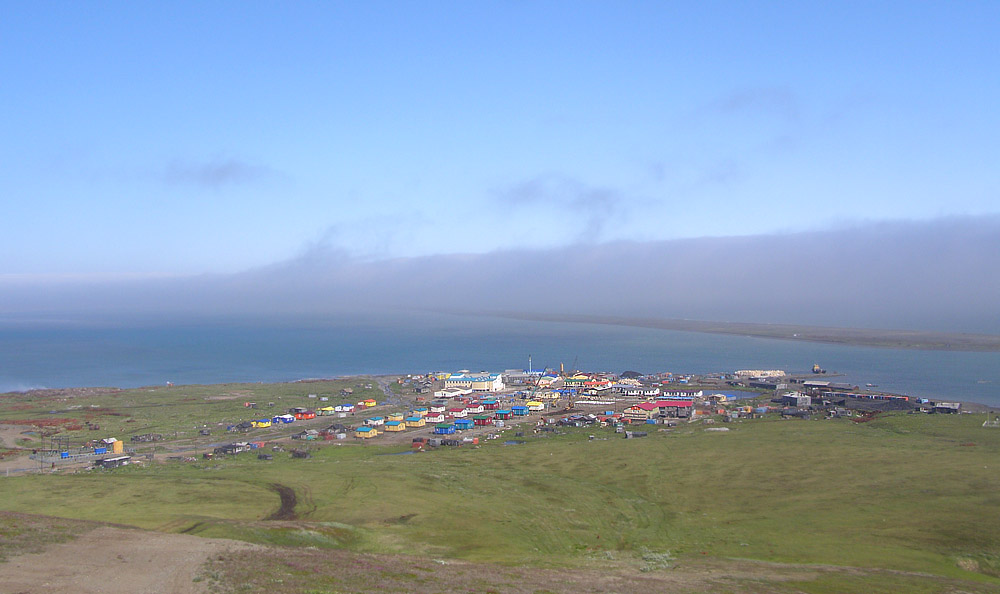
- Aerial view of the village of Khatyrka
- Interactive map of Khatyrka
- Location of Khatyrka Khatyrka (Chukotka Autonomous Okrug)
- Coordinates: 62°03′N 175°15′E
- Country: Russia
- Federal subject: Chukotka Autonomous Okrug
- Administrative district: Anadyrsky District
- Founded: c.1756

Area
  - Total: 1.16 km^{2} (0.45 sq mi)

Population (2010 Census)
  - Total: 377
  - Estimate (January 2018): 323 (−14.3%)
  - Density: 325/km^{2} (842/sq mi)

Municipal status
  - Municipal district: Anadyrsky Municipal District
  - Rural settlement: Khatyrka Rural Settlement
  - Capital of: Khatyrka Rural Settlement
- Time zone: UTC+12 (MSK+9)
- Postal code: 689120
- Dialing code: +7 42733
- OKTMO ID: 77603479101

Khatyrka (Russian: Хатырка, IPA: [xɐˈtɨrkə]; Chukchi: Ватыркан, romanized: Watyrkan) is a rural locality (a selo) in Anadyrsky District of Chukotka Autonomous Okrug, Russia. It is located on the shore of the Bering Sea southwest of Beringovsky. Khatyrka's population numbered 377 (2010 census); however, as of 2018, it had an estimated population of 323. Municipally, it is incorporated as Khatyrka Rural Settlement.

== History ==
Khatyrka is one of the oldest settlements in Anadyrsky district, having been founded around 1756. The name of the village and the nearby river was taken from the cape first mapped by the naval officer Sarychyevym, but first visited by the merchants Bakov and Novikov.

The Chuckchi call the place Vatyrkan, meaning dry or exhausted as the area surrounding the village is used for reindeer grazing. There are currently two brigades operating as the Khatyrskoye municipal agricultural unitary enterprise, tending for around 2000 reindeer on the tundra. Within the village, the cultural centre supports the national ensemble "Chukotka Dawns" (Russian: Чукотские зори).

== Demographics ==
The population according to the 2010 census was 377, of which 191 were male and 186 female, which is essentially in line with an April 2003 estimate, which recorded the population at 375, of which around 87% are of indigenous origin.

== Economy ==
The main occupations revolve around traditional indigenous economic activities of fishing and hunting, both on land and sea. There is also a successful reindeer herding enterprise on the pastures surrounding Khatyrka with around four hundred heads. Although this is a traditional enterprise among many Arctic peoples, these formerly nomadic enterprises were grouped together in the Soviet Union to form a collective farm (kolkhoz).

Following the dissolution of the Soviet Union, almost all government support was removed from the state farms as the market economy took over. However, unlike in villages such as Alkatvaam and Tavayvaam, when the state farm became the Municipal Unitary Enterprise of Rural Agricultural Producers, the herders were able to continue their livelihood.

There is an irony that the traditional economic driver of reindeer herding is succeeding here for the time being when it has either disappeared or been significantly reduced elsewhere given that the name of the village used by the Chukchi is Vatyrkan which translates as "a dry, exhausted land", despite the pastures surrounding the village.

As with many Chukotkan villages, Khatyrka has a traditional Chukchi ensemble and a cultural center. Additionally, the village has a new secondary boarding school, kindergarten, local hospital, recreation center, library, post office, communications center, shop and a bakery. The main occupation of the inhabitants is livestock. Brigades herd reindeer on pastures in the vicinity of the village above the river. In the village the municipal agricultural enterprise "Khatyrskoye" is based to run the reindeer herding operations. The village is also involved in traditional fishing and hunting of sea mammals, and a fish processing plant operates to service this. In 2011 the company launched a new slaughterhouse complex. Electricity is provided to the village by a local generator.

=== Transport ===
Khatyrka is not connected to any other inhabited place by any permanent road being situated on the coast at the mouth of the River Khatyrka. There is however, a number of roads within the village, including:

- Улица Набережная (Ulitsa Naberezhnaya, lit. Quay Street)
- Улица Озерная (Ulitsa Ozernaya, lit. Lake Street)
- Улица Речная (Ulitsa Rechnaya, lit. River Street)
- Улица Рылькеу (Ulitsa Rylkey, lit. River Street)
- Улица Советская (Ulitsa Sovetskaya, lit. Soviet Street)
- Улица Центральная (Ulitsa Tsentralnaya, lit. Central Street)
- Улица Школьная (Ulitsa Shkolnaya, lit. School Street)

A helicopter service to Anadyr is provided once or twice a month.

== Administrative vs. municipal jurisdiction ==
Until July 2008, Khatyrka was a part of both Beringovsky Municipal and Beringnovsky Administrative District. In May 2008, Beringovsky Municipal District was merged into Anadyrsky Municipal District; however, this change did not affect the borders of Beringovsky Administrative District. Khatyrka continued to administratively be a part of the latter until June 2011, when Beringovsky Administrative District was merged into Anadyrsky Administrative District and ceased to exist.

== Climate ==
Khatyrka has a tundra climate (Köppen ET) because the warmest month has an average temperature between 0 °C (32 °F) and 10 °C (50 °F). All seasons are moderated by the ocean, resulting in much less severe winters than in the interior. This does cause seasonal lag, which delays spring warm-up as well as making August the warmest month.

Climate data for Khatyrka
Month	Jan	Feb	Mar	Apr	May	Jun	Jul	Aug	Sep	Oct	Nov	Dec	Year
Record high °C (°F)	6.0 (42.8)	10.0 (50.0)	2.2 (36.0)	17.6 (63.7)	21.0 (69.8)	28.0 (82.4)	27.8 (82.0)	25.7 (78.3)	18.0 (64.4)	12.0 (53.6)	10.0 (50.0)	2.2 (36.0)	28.0 (82.4)
Mean daily maximum °C (°F)	−11.1 (12.0)	−13.7 (7.3)	−11.0 (12.2)	−6.0 (21.2)	2.1 (35.8)	8.4 (47.1)	11.9 (53.4)	12.0 (53.6)	8.3 (46.9)	−0.2 (31.6)	−7.8 (18.0)	−11.9 (10.6)	−1.8 (28.8)
Daily mean °C (°F)	−14.4 (6.1)	−17.0 (1.4)	−14.1 (6.6)	−9.1 (15.6)	−0.4 (31.3)	5.3 (41.5)	8.5 (47.3)	9.0 (48.2)	5.6 (42.1)	−2.9 (26.8)	−11.0 (12.2)	−15.2 (4.6)	−4.9 (23.2)
Mean daily minimum °C (°F)	−17.7 (0.1)	−20.4 (−4.7)	−17.6 (0.3)	−13.0 (8.6)	−2.9 (26.8)	3.0 (37.4)	6.3 (43.3)	6.7 (44.1)	3.0 (37.4)	−5.6 (21.9)	−14.1 (6.6)	−18.2 (−0.8)	−7.8 (18.0)
Record low °C (°F)	−38.0 (−36.4)	−40.6 (−41.1)	−35.0 (−31.0)	−30.0 (−22.0)	−22.2 (−8.0)	−3.4 (25.9)	−4.6 (23.7)	0.6 (33.1)	−7.2 (19.0)	−21.4 (−6.5)	−31.0 (−23.8)	−35.0 (−31.0)	−40.6 (−41.1)
Average precipitation mm (inches)	49.2 (1.94)	34.3 (1.35)	34.4 (1.35)	26.8 (1.06)	28.6 (1.13)	33.5 (1.32)	56.7 (2.23)	80.0 (3.15)	46.7 (1.84)	49.1 (1.93)	50.7 (2.00)	40.7 (1.60)	530.7 (20.89)
Source: climatebase.ru (1955–1991)

== See also ==
- List of inhabited localities in Anadyrsky District
- Komeutyuyam Range
