= Scalar theories of gravitation =

Scalar theories of gravitation are field theories of gravitation in which the gravitational field is described using a scalar field, which is required to satisfy some field equation.

Note: This article focuses on relativistic classical field theories of gravitation. The best known relativistic classical field theory of gravitation, general relativity, is a tensor theory, in which the gravitational interaction is described using a tensor field.

== Newtonian gravity ==
The prototypical scalar theory of gravitation is Newtonian gravitation. In this theory, the gravitational interaction is completely described by the potential $\Phi$, which is required to satisfy the Poisson equation (with the mass density acting as the source of the field):
$$\nabla^2 \Phi = 4 \pi G \rho,$$
where $G$ is the gravitational constant, and $\rho$ is the mass-energy density.

This field theory formulation leads directly to the familiar law of universal gravitation,
$$F = G \frac{m_1 m_2}{r^2}.$$

== Nordström's theories of gravitation ==
The first attempts to present a relativistic (classical) field theory of gravitation were also scalar theories. Gunnar Nordström created two such theories.

Nordström's first idea (1912) was to simply replace the divergence operator in the field equation of Newtonian gravity with the d'Alembert operator $\square = \partial_t^2 - \nabla^2$. This gives the field equation
$$\square \Phi = -4 \pi G \rho.$$
However, several theoretical difficulties with this theory quickly arose, and Nordström dropped it.

A year later, Nordström tried again, presenting the field equation
$$\Phi \square \Phi = -4 \pi G T,$$
where $T$ is the trace of the stress–energy tensor.

Solutions of Nordström's second theory are conformally flat Lorentzian spacetimes. That is, the metric tensor can be written as $g_{\mu\nu} = A \eta_{\mu\nu}$, where η_{μν} is the Minkowski metric, and $A$ is a scalar which is a function of position. This suggestion signifies that the inertial mass should depend on the scalar field.

Nordström's second theory satisfies the weak equivalence principle. However:

- The theory fails to predict any deflection of light passing near a massive body (contrary to observation).
- The theory predicts an anomalous perihelion precession of Mercury, but this disagrees in both sign and magnitude with the observed anomalous precession (the part which cannot be explained using Newtonian gravitation).

Despite these disappointing results, Einstein's critiques of Nordström's second theory played an important role in his development of general relativity.

== Einstein's scalar theory ==
In 1913, Einstein (erroneously) concluded from his hole argument that general covariance was not viable. Inspired by Nordström's work, he proposed his own scalar theory. This theory employs a massless scalar field coupled to the stress–energy tensor, which is the sum of two terms. The first,
$$T^{\mu\nu}_g = \frac{1}{4 \pi G} \left[\partial^\mu \phi \,\partial^\nu \phi - \frac{1}{2} \eta^{\mu\nu} \,\partial_\lambda \phi \,\partial^\lambda \phi \right],$$
represents the stress–momentum–energy of the scalar field itself. The second represents the stress–momentum–energy of any matter which may be present:
$$T^{\mu\nu}_m = \rho \phi u^\mu u^\nu,$$
where $u^\mu$ is the four-velocity vector of an observer, or tangent vector to the world line of the observer. (Einstein made no attempt, in this theory, to take account of possible gravitational effects of the field energy of the electromagnetic field.)

Unfortunately, this theory is not diffeomorphism-covariant. This is an important consistency condition, so Einstein dropped this theory in late 1914. Associating the scalar field with the metric leads to Einstein's later conclusions that the theory of gravitation he sought could not be a scalar theory. Indeed, the theory he finally arrived at in 1915, general relativity, is a tensor theory, not a scalar theory, with a 2-tensor, the metric, as the potential. Unlike his 1913 scalar theory, it is generally covariant and does take into account the field energy–momentum–stress of the electromagnetic field (or any other nongravitational field).

== Additional variations ==
- Kaluza–Klein theory involves the use of a scalar gravitational field in addition to the electromagnetic field potential $A^\mu$ in an attempt to create a five-dimensional unification of gravity and electromagnetism. Its generalization with a 5th variable component of the metric that leads to a variable gravitational constant was first given by Pascual Jordan.
- Brans–Dicke theory is a scalar-tensor theory, not a scalar theory, meaning that it represents the gravitational interaction using both a scalar field and a tensor field. We mention it here because one of the field equations of this theory involves only the scalar field and the trace of the stress–energy tensor, as in Nordström's theory. Moreover, the Brans–Dicke theory is equal to the independently derived theory of Jordan (hence it is often referred to as the Jordan-Brans–Dicke or JBD theory). The Brans–Dicke theory couples a scalar field with the curvature of space-time and is self-consistent and, assuming appropriate values for a tunable constant, this theory has not been ruled out by observation. The Brans–Dicke theory is generally regarded as a leading competitor of general relativity, which is a pure tensor theory. However, the Brans–Dicke theory seems to need too high a parameter, which favours general relativity).
- Zee combined the idea of the BD theory with the Higgs-Mechanism of Symmetry Breakdown for mass generation, which led to a scalar-tensor theory with Higgs field as scalar field, in which the scalar field is massive (short-ranged). An example of this theory was proposed by H. Dehnen and H. Frommert 1991, parting from the nature of Higgs field interacting gravitational- and Yukawa (long-ranged)-like with the particles that get mass through it.
- The Watt–Misner theory (1999) is a recent example of a scalar theory of gravitation. It is not intended as a viable theory of gravitation (since, as Watt and Misner point out, it is not consistent with observation), but as a toy theory which can be useful in testing numerical relativity schemes. It also has pedagogical value.

== See also ==
- Nordström's theory of gravitation
