= Arsenic minerals =

Group of minerals

Arsenic
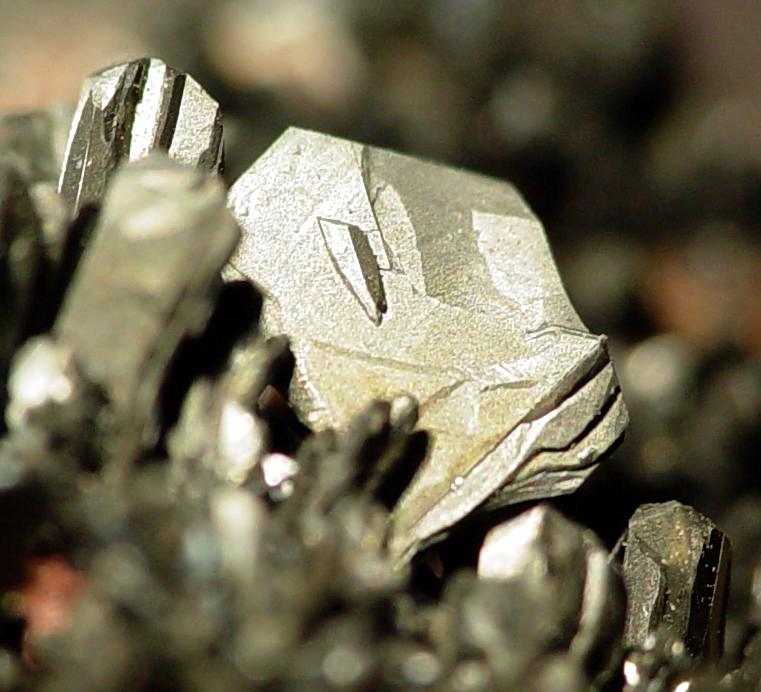

General
- Category: Minerals
- Formula: FeAsS (arsenopyrite)
- Strunz classification: 01.CA.05
- Dana classification: 01.03.01 (Arsenic Group)
- Crystal system: Monoclinic
- Crystal class: Sulphide
- Space group: Trigonal, hexagonal scalenohedral

Identification
- Colour: Lead gray, grey, white
- Crystal habit: Lamellar, nodular, reniform
- Cleavage: Perfect
- Fracture: Subconchoidal, uneven
- Mohs scale hardness: 3.5
- Streak: Black
- Diaphaneity: Opaque
- Density: 5.7

The arsenic minerals or arsenic group are a group of trigonal symmetry minerals composed of arsenic-like elements, and one alloy.

The elements are arsenic, antimony and bismuth. The alloy is stibarsen (SbA) an alloy of arsenic and antimony.
