= Khatyrka meteorite =

Meteorite found in Russia

Khatyrka
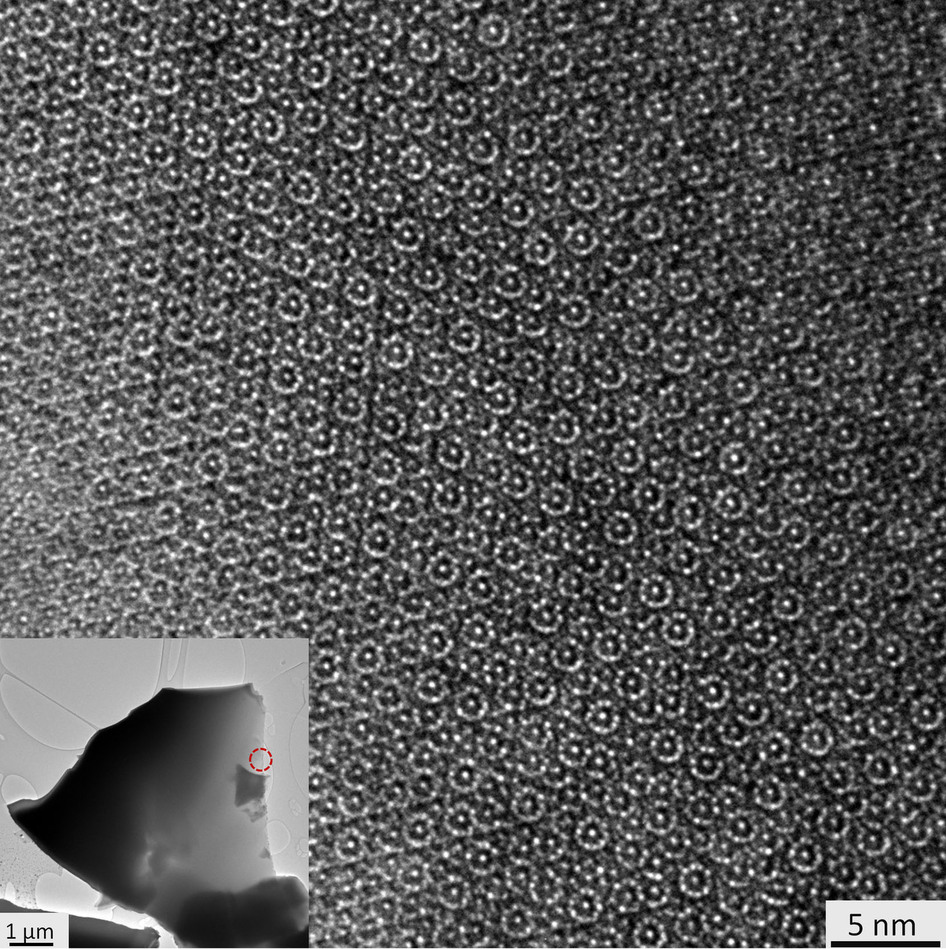
- High-resolution electron-microscopy image of natural Al_{71}Ni_{24}Fe_{5} quasicrystal found in the Khatyrka meteorite.
- Type: Chondrite
- Class: CV3
- Country: Russia
- Region: Chukotka
- Coordinates: 62°39′11″N 174°30′2″E
- Observed fall: No
- Found date: 2011
- TKW: 0.1 g
- Related media on Wikimedia Commons

Khatyrka (Russian: метеорит Хатырка) is a meteorite found in 2011 in the valley of the Iomrautvaam, a tributary of the Khatyrka river, Chukotka Autonomous Okrug, Russian Far East. It is a CV3 (oxidized) chondrite meteorite.

== History ==
The meteorite had fallen in the Iomrautvaam river basin at 62°39′11″N 174°30′02″E and was discovered during an expedition to Chukotka in July 2011. Nine small pieces were found, each less than 1 mm in size, buried in a 7,000-year-old layer of dirt. It was named Khatyrka meteorite. This meteorite has become very famous among the scientific community because it contains the first known naturally occurring quasicrystal. Quasicrystals have an ordered but non-periodic structure and, before this discovery, it was thought that they could only be created artificially. The meteorite was found to contain icosahedrite, an alloy of aluminum, copper, and iron. Studies have shown that the quasicrystal formed more than 4 billion years ago in space, probably during a violent collision between planetary bodies, under extremely high temperatures and pressures. In other words, the discovery of this meteorite demonstrated that quasicrystals can form naturally in space and remain stable for billions of years.

== Specimens ==
Three representative fragments were deposited at the Department of Mineral Sciences, NHB-119, National Museum of Natural History, Smithsonian Institution.

== See also ==
- Glossary of meteoritics
- Khatyrkite
- Quasicrystal
