= Luca Bindi =

Italian geologist (born 1971)

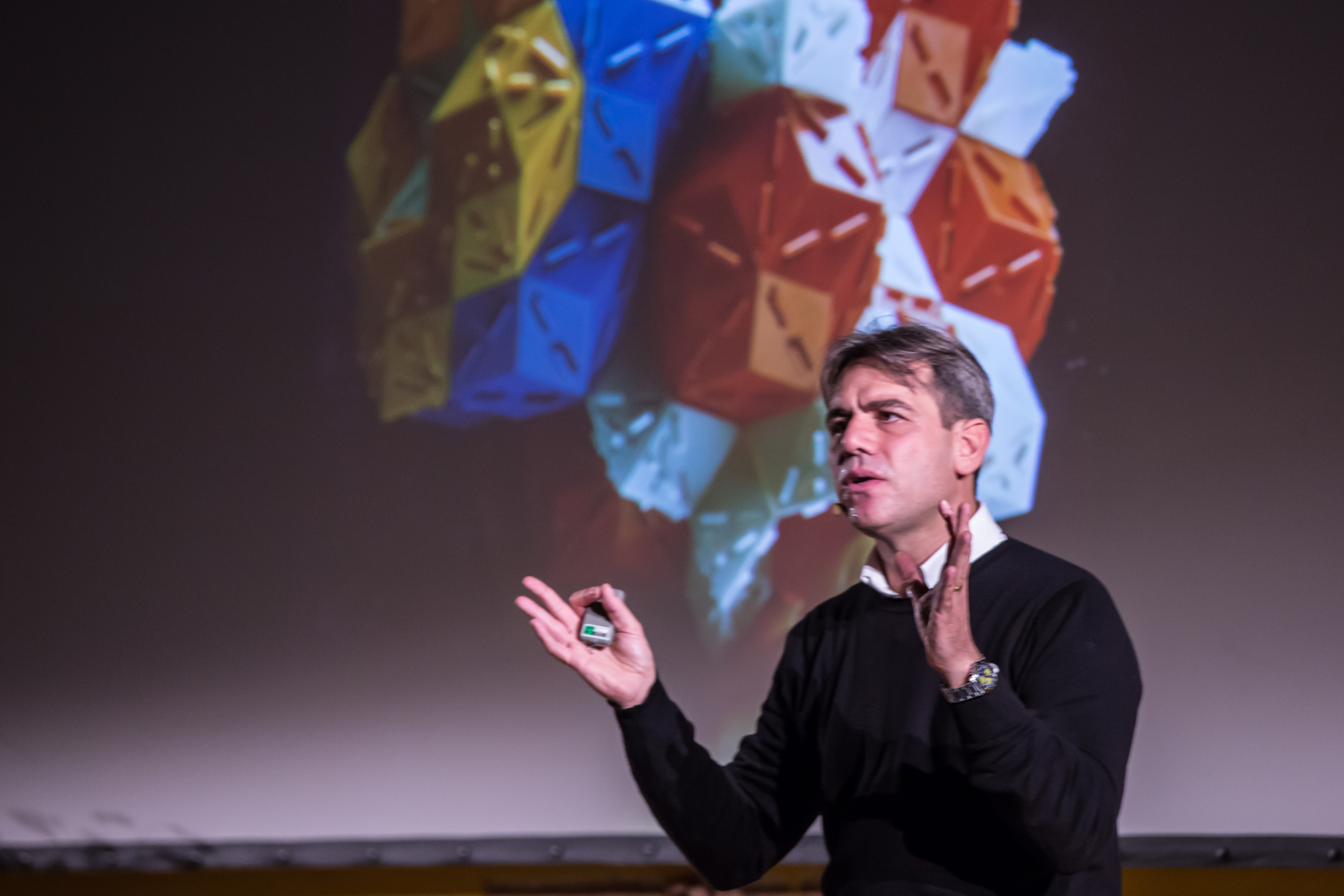
- Born: 2 December 1971 (age 54); Prato, Italy
- Known for: crystal structure solution; quasicrystals; twinning in mineral structures; crystal-chemistry of rock-forming minerals
- Awards: Premio Presidente della Repubblica, 2015
- Scientific career
- Fields: Geology; Mineralogy; Crystallography; Materials Science
- Workplaces: University of Florence, Italy

Luca Bindi (born 1971) is an Italian geologist. He holds the Chair of Mineralogy and Crystallography and is the Head of the Department of Earth Sciences of the University of Florence. He is also a research associate at the Istituto di Geoscienze e Georisorse of the National Research Council (Italy) (CNR). He has received national and international scientific awards including the 2015 President of the Republic Prize in the category of Physical, Mathematical and Natural Sciences. Since 2019 he has been a Member of the National Academy of Lincei.

He is the Italian scientist who has contributed to the description of the highest number of new minerals and is among the top ten researchers in the world for the number of new mineralogical species described. In his career he has described about 3% of the 7,000 minerals known in nature. Most of the new materials were discovered in the collections of the Museum System of the University of Florence, with its approximately fifty thousand specimens.

Bindi is credited with the co-discovery of the first known natural quasicrystal, having identified a potential candidate from the mineral collection at the University of Florence. The discovery ultimately showed that quasicrystals can form spontaneously in nature and remain stable for geological times.

== Recognition ==
Awards for his research include:

- Panichi Prize for mineralogical investigations of the Italian Society of Mineralogy and Petrology (2004)
- Nardelli Prize awarded by the Italian Association of Crystallography (2006)
- Excellence Research Medal awarded by the European Mineralogical Union
- Foreign Outstanding Young Researcher Award from the Russian Mineralogical Society (2007)
- Luigi Tartufari Prize for Geology of the Accademia Nazionale dei Lincei (2010)
- Award given by the President of the Republic (2015)
- Aspen Institute Italia Award with Paul J. Steinhardt for scientific research and collaboration between Italy and the United States (2018)
- Neumann Medal 2023 of the Mineralogical Society of Great Britain and Ireland
- 2024 Gold Medal for Science of the National Academy of Sciences
- Leonardo Prize for Scientific Research, awarded by the Croce del Sud Association (2025).
- Fiorino d’Oro, awarded by the City of Florence (2026).

Two of his scientific works related to the discovery of the first natural quasicrystal, icosahedrite, were cited in Scientific Background on the Nobel Prize in Chemistry 2011 – The Discovery of Quasicrystals of the Nobel Committee for Chemistry of the Royal Swedish Academy of Sciences.

On 2011, the mineral lucabindiite was named in his honor.

On 29 May 2018, the asteroid 92279 Bindiluca was named in his honor.

== Research ==
Bindi has numerous international collaborations, especially with Princeton University, Harvard University, and the California Institute of Technology.

His research activity, condensed in more than 300 scientific publications, has been devoted to four different areas:

1. mantle mineralogy (clinopyroxenes, garnets, akimotoite, bridgmanite, hiroseite, ahrensite, wadsleyite, post-spinel phases, dense hydrous magnesium silicates);
2. aperiodic structures in the mineral kingdom (melilite, fresnoite, calaverite, natrite, muthmannite, pearceite-polybasite, icosahedrite, decagonite);
3. superstructures, twinning, OD-phenomena and structural complexity in minerals (melilites, pearceite, polybasite, samsonite, calaverite, empressite, fettelite, quadratite, sinnerite, sartorite, meneghinite, zinkenite);
4. structure solution of unknown structures and description of new mineral species (about 300 crystal structures solved and ~150 new mineral species described)

Significant among his research works are the crystal-chemical studies of major mineral phases for the Earth's mantle, and studies of potassium-rich clinopyroxene, which had broad international resonance. He is also very well known for his studies on the complexity of mineral structures integrating mineralogy with the most-advanced fields of crystallography.

== Controversies ==
In July 2020, on the basis of an anonymous report, the Florence edition of national newspaper La Repubblica wrote that Professor Bindi took up portions of the text of his program as candidate for the position of Head of the Department of Earth Sciences of the University of Florence. La Repubblica reported that Professor Bindi said that it was only a provisional, unofficial document, which would have been discussed with all the members of the department in case he was elected. Further, Bindi commented that he had carefully read many election programs of candidates for the position of Director of the Department, precisely to learn and be stimulated by the initiatives planned for other departments so as to find ideas to be taken up and possibly improved in his department. On July 27, 2020, Bindi was elected as Head of the Department of Earth Sciences of the University of Florence.
