= Iomrautvaam =

River in the Russian Far East

Iomrautvaam Иомраутваам / Емрауткенваам
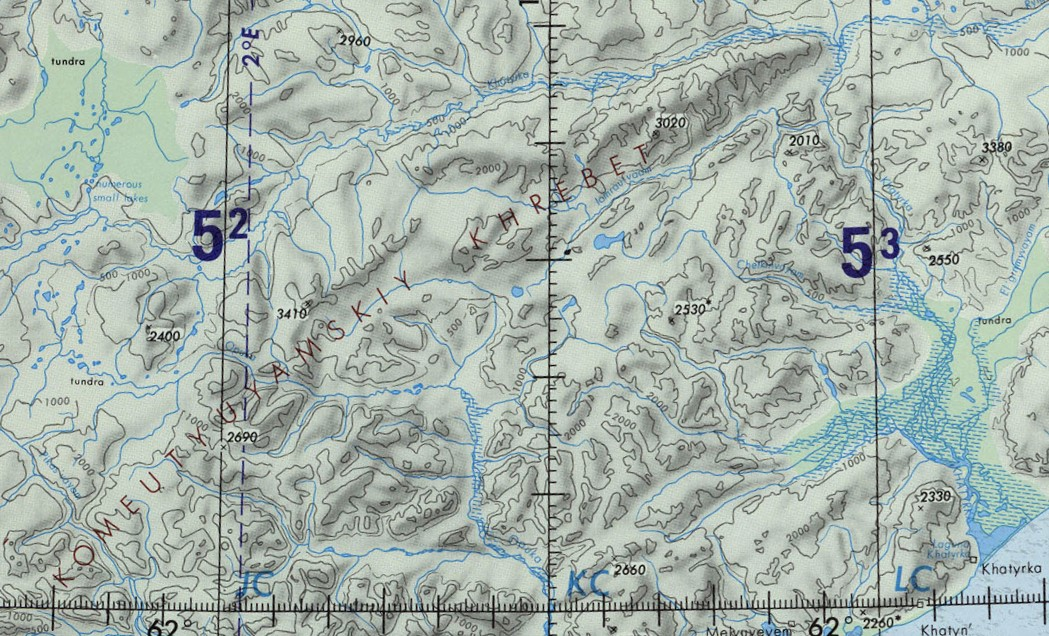
- Course of the Iomrautvaam in the upper right

- Mouth location in Chukotka Iomrautvaam (Far Eastern Federal District)

Location
- Country: Russia
- Federal subject: Chukotka Autonomous Okrug
- District: Anadyr District

Physical characteristics
- Source
  - location: Komeutyuyam Range
  - elevation: ca 700 metres (2,300 ft)
- Mouth: Khatyrka
  - coordinates: 62°41′26″N 174°51′45″E
  - elevation: 60 metres (200 ft)
- Length: 103 km (64 mi)
- Basin size: 1,310 km^{2} (510 sq mi)

Basin features
- Progression: Khatyrka → Bering Sea

The Iomrautvaam (Russian: Иомраутваам; Chukot: Емрауткенваам) is a river in Chukotka Autonomous Okrug, Russia. The length of the river is 103 kilometres (64 mi) and the area of is drainage basin 1,310 square kilometres (510 mi^{2}).

The Iomrautvaam is the longest tributary of the Khatyrka river.

== Course ==
The Iomrautvaam has its source in the Komeutyuyam Range of the Koryak Highlands. It flows in a roughly northeastern direction in the northern section of the range. Finally it meets the right bank of the Khatyrka 100 kilometres (62 mi) from its mouth, close to the northeastern end of the ridge.

=== Khatyrka meteorite ===
The Khatyrka meteorite, a unique-type of meteorite fell in the area of the Iomrautvaam river basin at 62°39′11″N 174°30′02″E. It was found during an expedition to Chukotka in the summer of 2011 buried in a 7,000-year-old layer of dirt and was named Khatyrka meteorite.

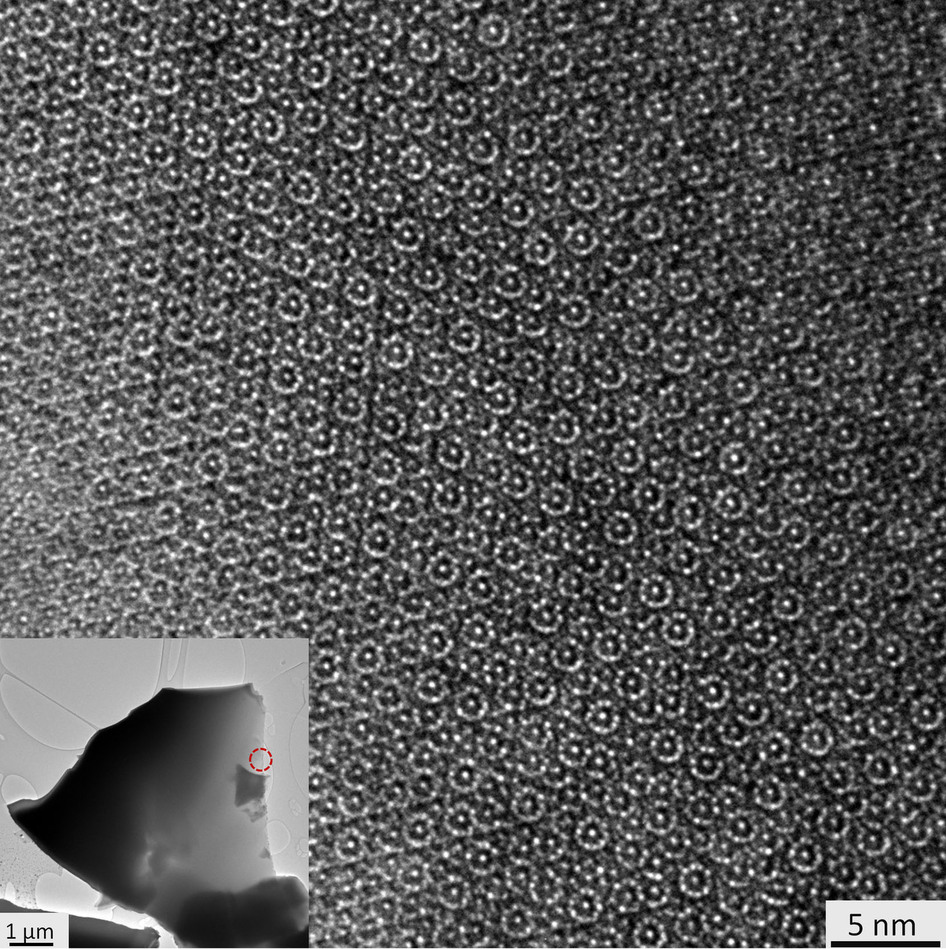
High-resolution electron-microscopy image of natural Al_{71}Ni_{24}Fe_{5} quasicrystal found in the Khatyrka meteorite.

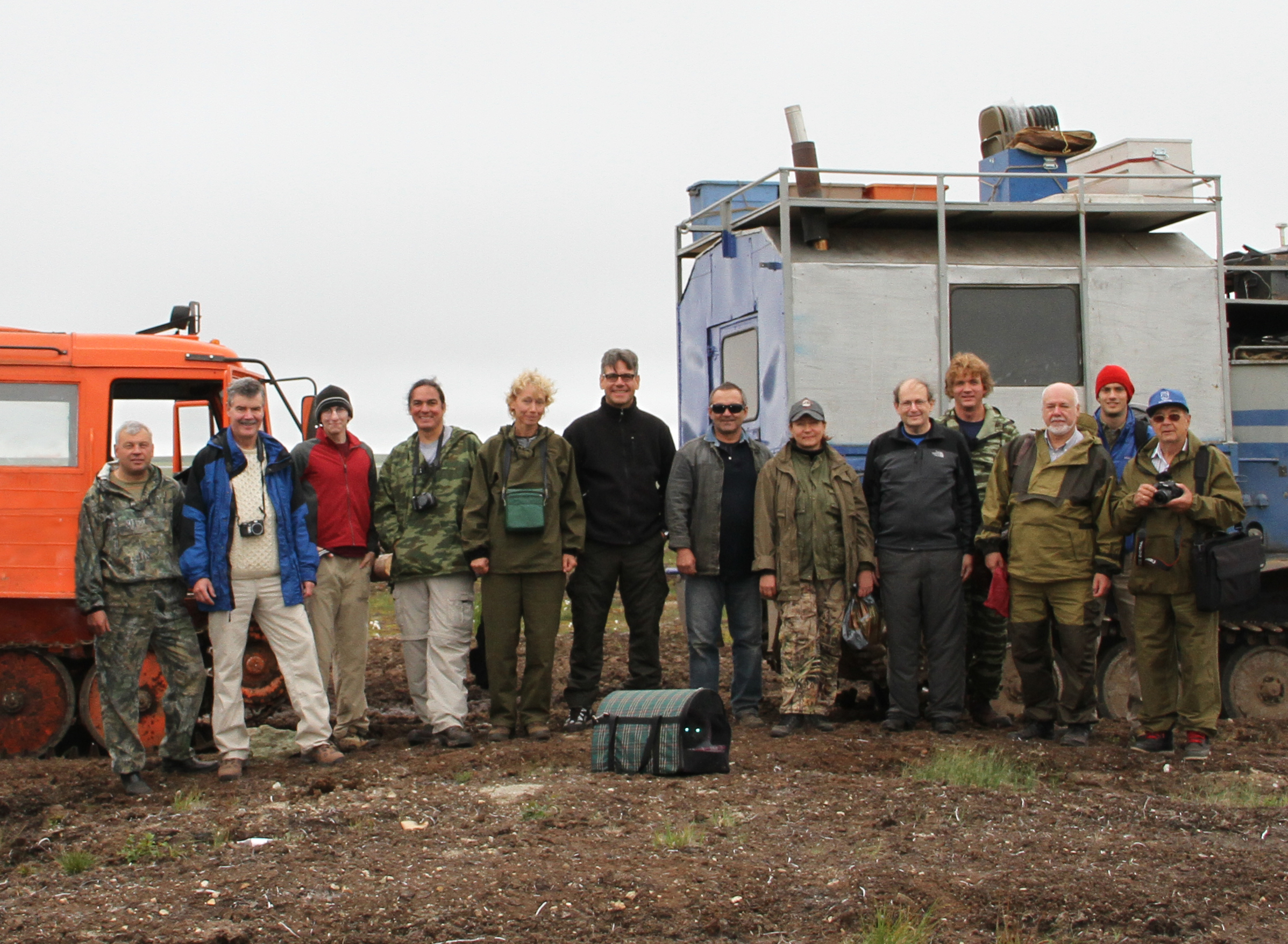
Members of the 2011 expedition that visited the Iomrautvaam area and found the Khatyrka meteorite.

== Flora and fauna ==
The river basin is characterized by tundra vegetation, including mosses, lichens, dwarf shrubs, and sedges.

== See also ==
- Khatyrkite
- List of rivers of Russia
