= Khatyrka (river) =

River in the Russian Far East

Khatyrka Хатырка (Russian) Ватыркан (Chukot)
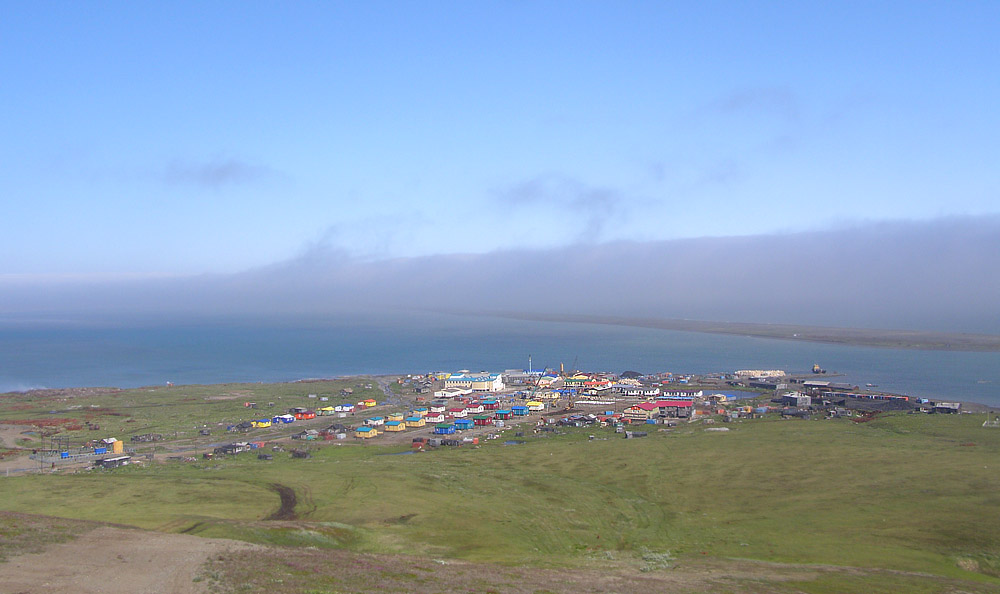
- Panorama of the Khatyrka estuary

- Mouth location in Chukotka Khatyrka (river) (Far Eastern Federal District)

Location
- Country: Russia
- Federal subject: Chukotka Autonomous Okrug
- District: Anadyr District

Physical characteristics
- Source
  - location: Koryak Highlands
  - coordinates: 62°18′03″N 171°29′06″E
  - elevation: ca 600 metres (2,000 ft)
- Mouth: Bering Sea
  - coordinates: 62°02′35″N 175°16′40″E
  - elevation: 0 metres (0 ft)
- Length: 367 km (228 mi)
- Basin size: 13,400 km^{2} (5,200 sq mi)
- Discharge
  - average: 174 m^{3}/s (6,100 cu ft/s)

The Khatyrka (/xəˈtɪərkə/; Russian: Хатырка, IPA: [xɐˈtɨrkə]; Chukchi: Ватыркан, romanized: Watyrkan) is a river in Chukotka Autonomous Okrug, Russia. The length of the river is 367 kilometres (228 mi) and the area of its drainage basin is 13,400 square kilometres (5,200 mi^{2}).

The name of the river comes from the Chukot watyrkan (ватыркан), meaning 'a dry, depleted place'.

== Course ==
The Khatyrka has its source in the Koryak Highlands. It first flows in an ENE direction along the northern slopes of the Komeutyuyam Range as a mountain river within a narrow valley. It bends to the SSE at the northeastern end of the range and the valley expands, the river dividing into channels. In its lower course it flows along a marshy floodplain. A stretch of the river forms the border with the Olyutorsky District of Kamchatka Krai. Its mouth is in an estuary that is separated by a narrow landspit from the Bering Sea. Khatyrka village lies at the mouth of the estuary.

=== Tributaries ===
The main tributary of the Khatyrka is the 103 km (64 mi) long Iomrautvaam (Иомраутваам), joining it from the right. A unique-type of meteorite fell in the area of the Iomrautvaam river basin and was buried in a 7,000-year-old layer of dirt. It was found during an expedition to Chukotka in the summer of 2011.

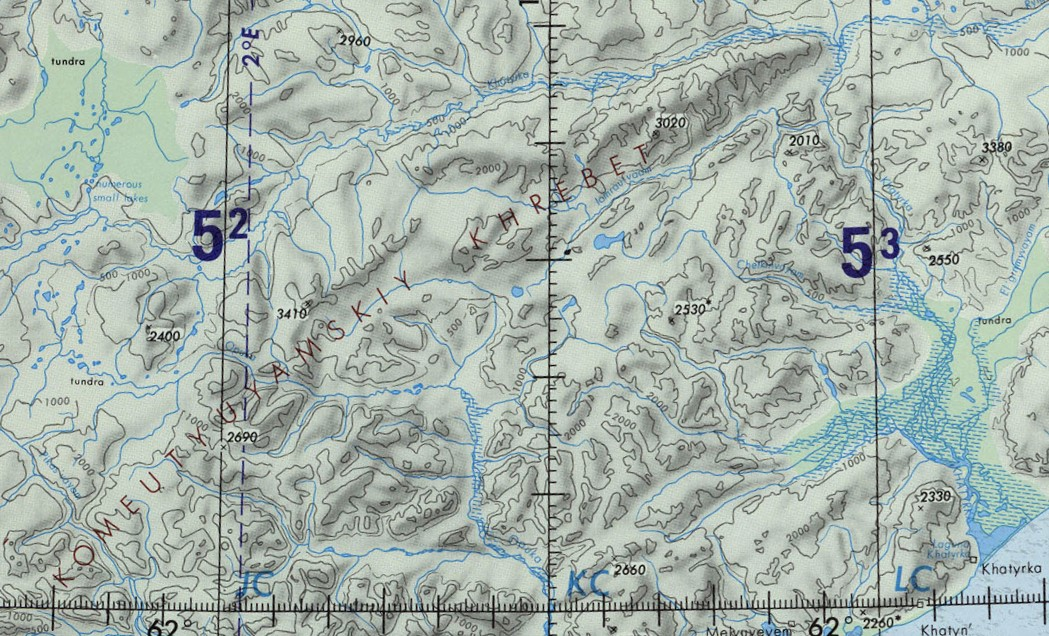
Course of the Khatyrka.

== Flora and fauna ==
The river basin is characterized by tundra vegetation, including mosses, lichens, dwarf shrubs, and sedges.

The inhabitants of the area are engaged in reindeer herding. River Khatyrka is a good place for fishing. Among the fish species found in the waters of the river the pink salmon, chum salmon, sockeye salmon and Chinook salmon deserve mention.

== See also ==
- Khatyrkite
- List of rivers of Russia
