= Ukvushvuynen Range =

Mountain range in the country of Russia

- горы Уквушвуйнен
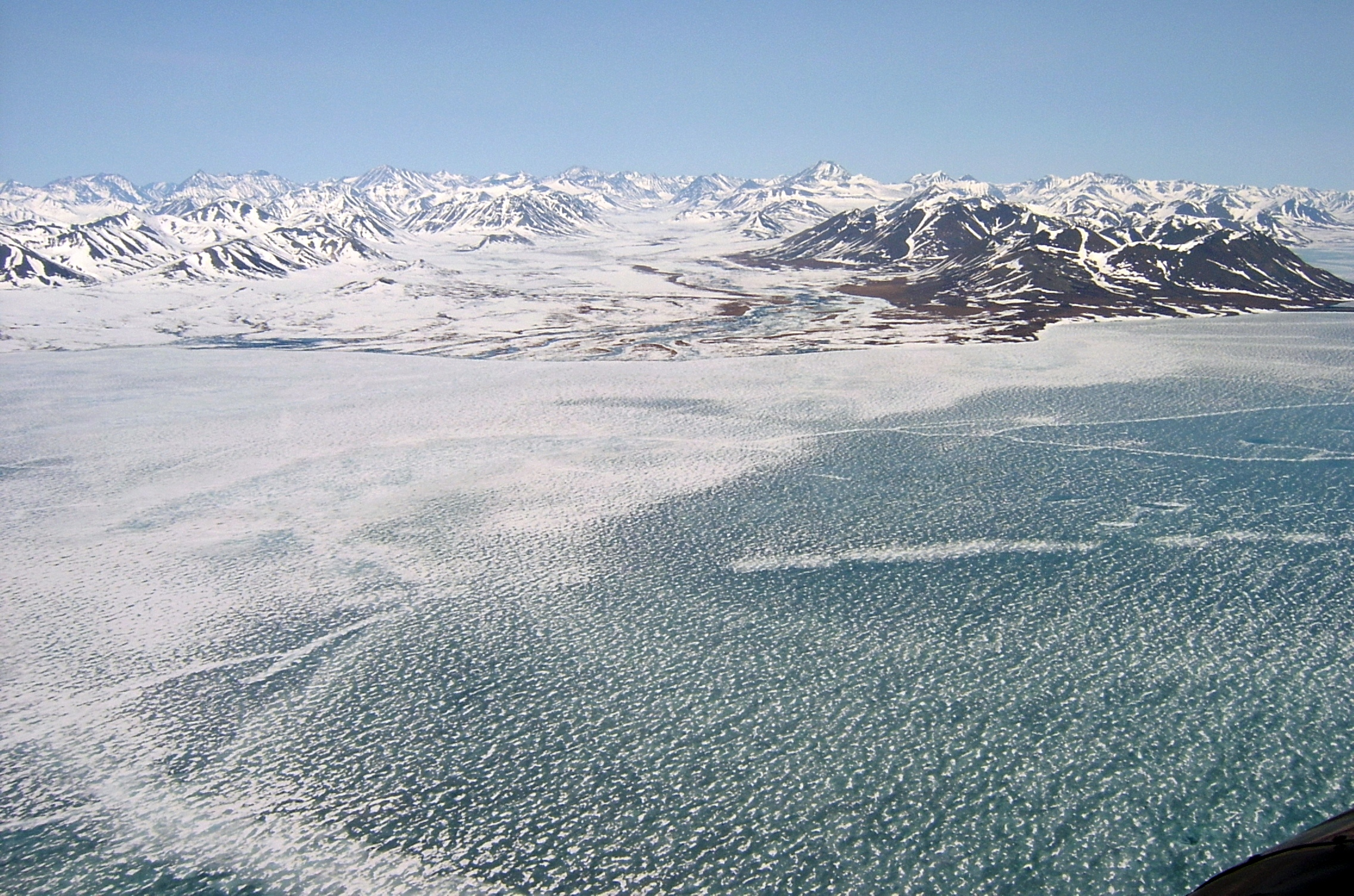
- Landscape of the range rising on the northern side of Lake Pekulney.

Highest point
- Peak: Mount Krasnaya
- Elevation: 1,423 m (4,669 ft)
- Coordinates: 63°0′N 177°30′E

Dimensions
- Length: 280 km (170 mi) WNW/ESE
- Width: 60 km (37 mi) NNE/SSW

Geography
- Location within Chukotka Autonomous Okrug
- Location: Chukotka Autonomous Okrug, Russian Far East
- Parent range: Koryak Highlands

Geology
- Orogeny: Alpine orogeny
- Rock age: Cretaceous
- Rock type(s): Sandstone, slate and igneous rock intrusions

Climbing
- Easiest route: from Meynypilgyno

The Ukvushvuynen Range (Russian: горы Уквушвуйнен; Chinese: 乌克武什武伊年山), also known as Meingypilgyn Range (Russian: Мэйнгыпильгынский хребет), is a range of mountains in Chukotka Autonomous Okrug, Russian Far East. Administratively the range is part of Anadyr District.

== Geography ==
The Ukvushvuynen Range is the easternmost subrange of the Koryak Highlands, East Siberian Mountains. It stretches roughly from east to west in southern Chukotka, between the Koyverelan Range to the west and Cape Navarin in the Bering Sea to the east. To the northwest rises the Rarytkin Range and the Velikaya River flows into the Anadyr Lowlands. To the southwest stretches the Komeutyuyam Range.

The highest mountains of the Ukvushvuynen Range are located in its western part. The highest summit is 1,423 metres (4,669 ft) high Gora Krasnaya (гора красная), rising to the south of lake Yanragytgyn. Other high peaks of the range are 1,407 metres (4,616 ft) high Gora Tsirk (гора цирк) and 1,058 metres (3,471 ft) high mount Kenkeren (кэнкэрэн), the latter rising above the NW side of lake Maynits in the central part of the range. Vaamochka and Pekulney are coastal lagoons that lie on the southern side of the range.

The range has 28 mountain glaciers. The Kakanaut River, a small river flowing southwards in the central part of the range into the NE bay of Lake Pekulney, gives its name to the Kakanaut Maastrichtian geological formation.

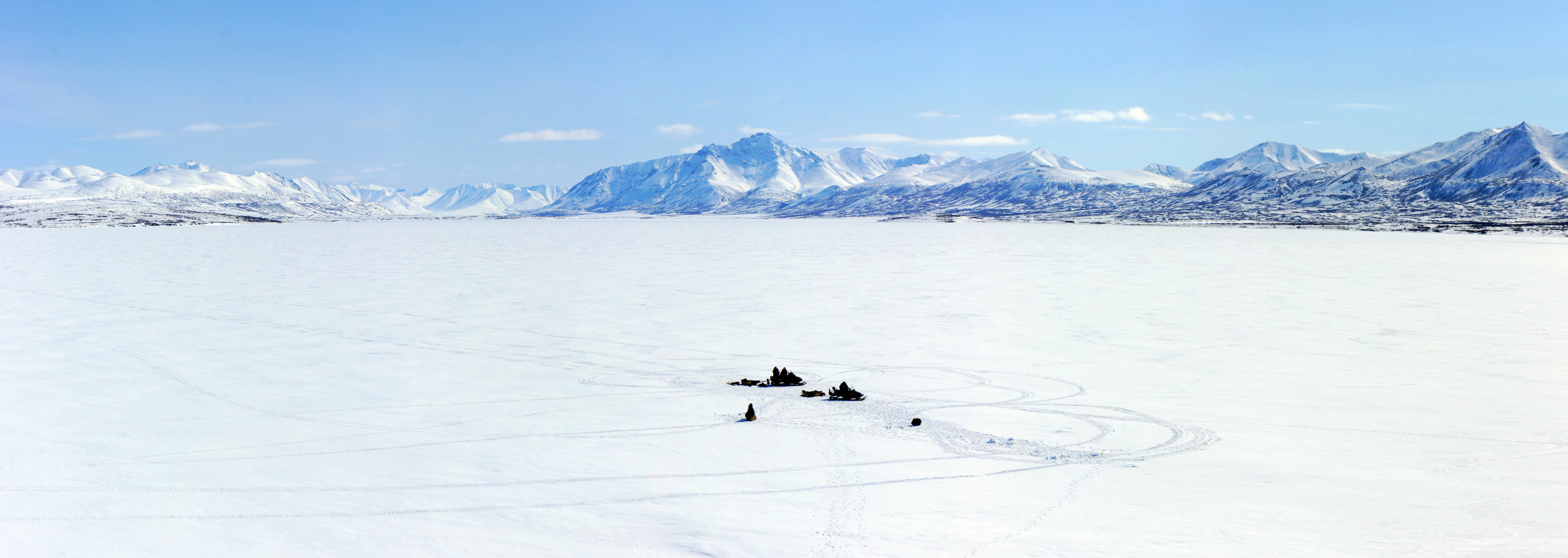
Panorama of Lake Maynits.

== Flora and climate ==
There are shrub areas of Siberian pine in the lower mountain slopes, while the upper elevations are covered with mountain tundra. The Ukvushvuynen Range has a subarctic climate, somewhat moderated by the proximity of the ocean. The average temperature in January is −20 °C (−4 °F) and the temperature in July is 10 °C (50 °F). Very little precipitation falls in winter in the form of snow, most falls as rain in the summer. The average depth of the snow cover is 50 centimeters (20 in).

== Bibliography ==
- Elizabeth L. Miller, Arthur Grantz, Simon Klemperer eds. - Tectonic Evolution of the Bering Shelf-Chukchi Sea-Arctic Margin and Adjacent Landmasses

== See also ==
- Kakanaut Formation
