= Beringovsky =

Beringovsky (masculine), Beringovskaya (feminine), or Beringovskoye (neuter) may refer to:

- Beringovsky District, a former district of Chukotka Autonomous Okrug, Russia
- Beringovsky (inhabited locality), an urban locality (a work settlement) in Chukotka Autonomous Okrug, Russia
