= Beringovsky District =

Coordinates: 62°40′N 176°00′E

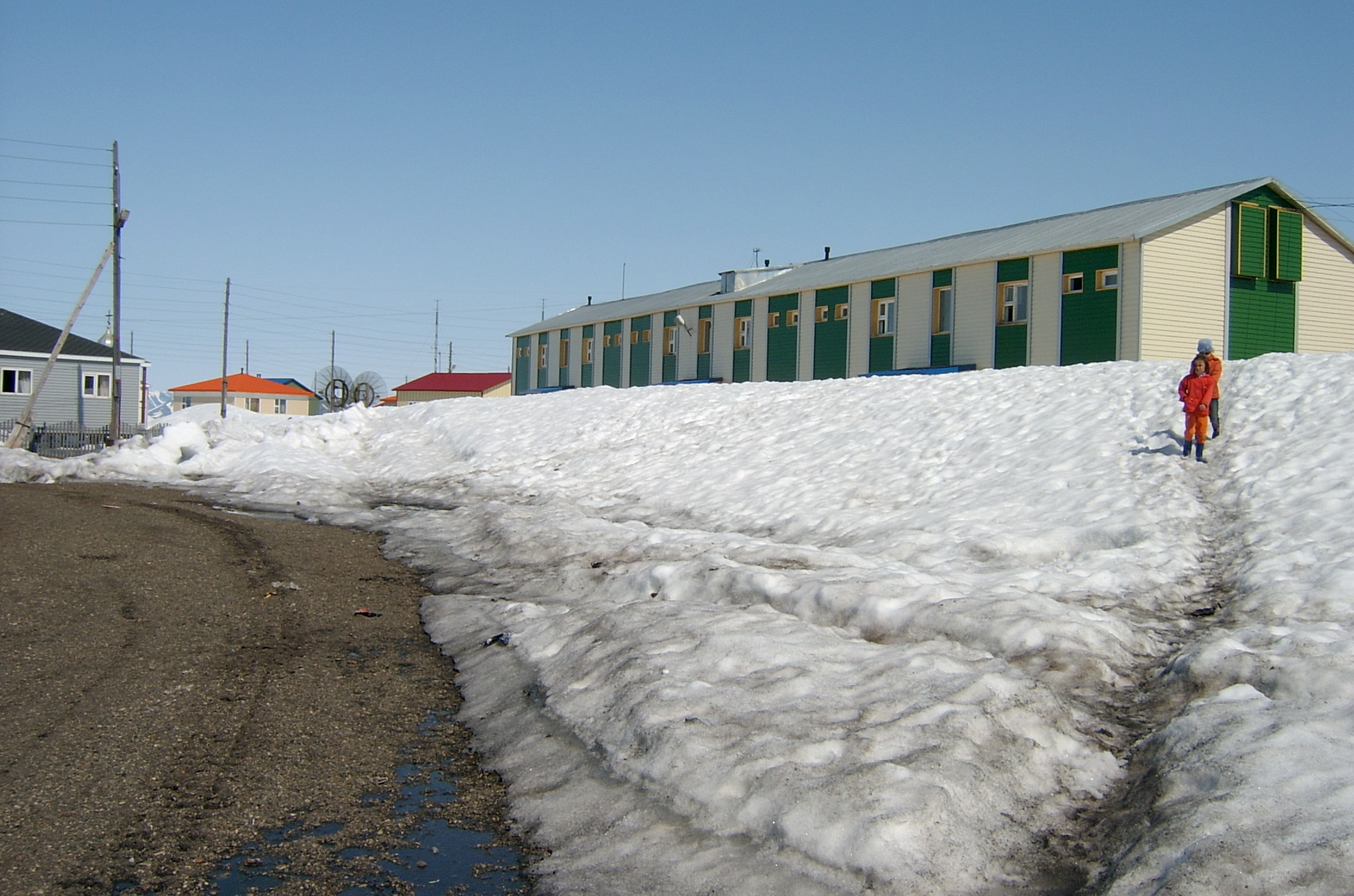
Scene from Meynypilgyno in Beringovsky District

Beringovsky District (Russian: Бе́ринговский райо́н) was an administrative district (raion) of Chukotka Autonomous Okrug, Russia, which existed in 1957–2011. As a municipal division, it was, together with Anadyrsky Administrative District, incorporated as Anadyrsky Municipal District. It was located on the southeastern shores of the autonomous okrug and bordered with Anadyrsky District in the west and the Bering Sea in the east. Its administrative center was the urban locality (an urban-type settlement) of Beringovsky. Population: 2,501 (2010 Census); 3,162 (2002 Census); 8,968 (1989 Soviet census). The area of the district was 37,900 square kilometers (14,600 sq mi).

== Geography ==
The district was the smallest in area of all districts within Chukotka Autonomous Okrug. It was a particularly mountainous region, part of the Koryak Highlands, and was a center for glaciation within the okrug. As a result of this, and due to the fact that a significant proportion of the less rugged land in the interior of the district was used for reindeer pasture, the administrative center of Beringovsky and three other native villages in the district were all situated on the coast of the Bering Sea. As the sea in this area rarely, if ever, freezes, it was the main transport route between settlements, especially considering that the road network within the district was almost non-existent. There is a short paved road at around 10 kilometers (6.2 mi) from Beringovsky to the airport, a 150 kilometers (93 mi) ice road from Beringovsky to Meynypilgyno, and a 130 kilometers (81 mi) ice road from Meynypilgyno to Khatyrka. The other rural locality in the district, Alkatvaam, was not connected by road to any other populated places and despite its proximity to Beringovsky all transport was done by sea or a helicopter.

== Economy ==
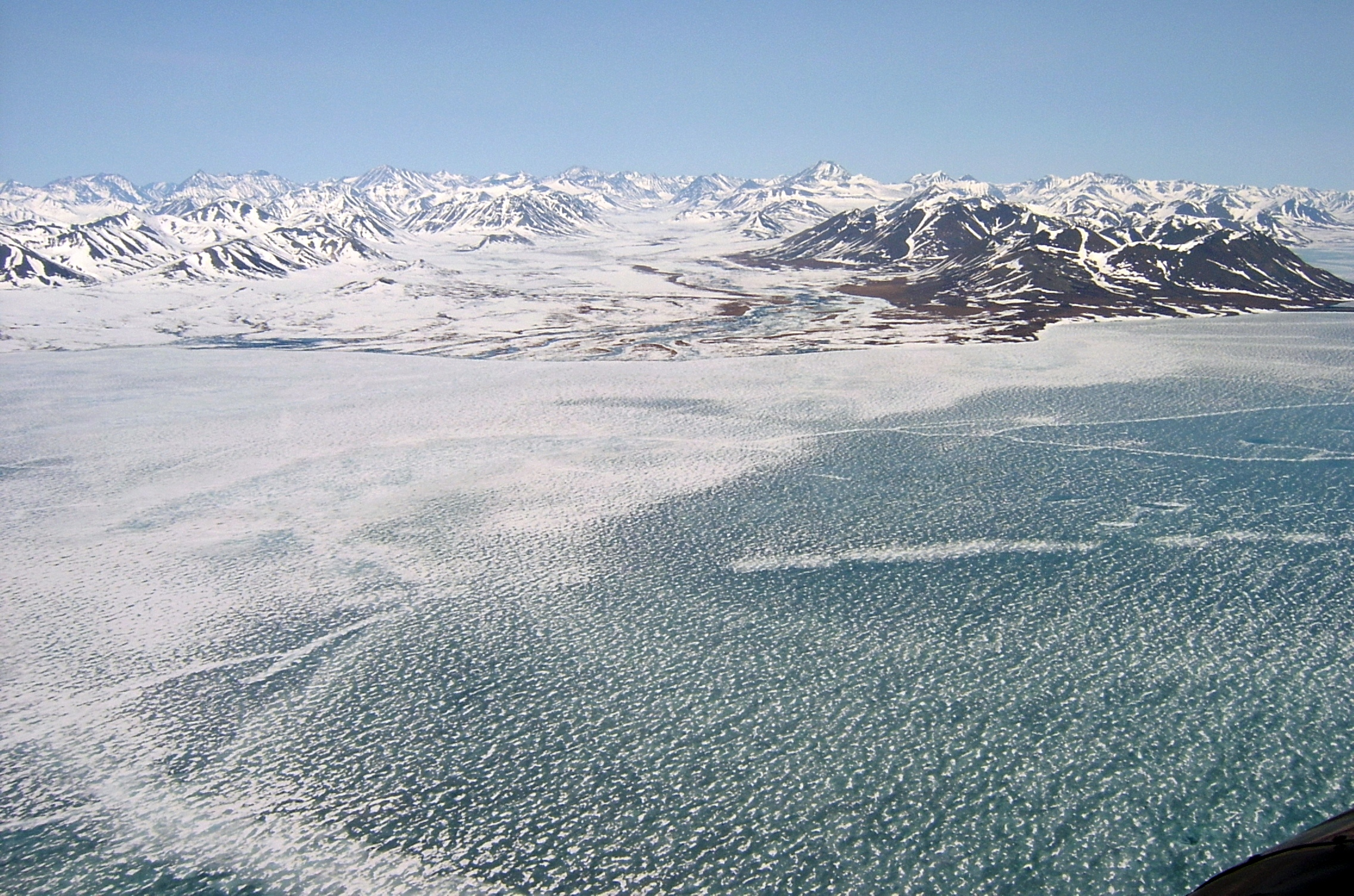
Aerial of photo of Pekulney Lake, near Meynypilgyno.

As with much of Chukotka, mining for coal and minerals was the main driver of the economy, leaving agriculture and other forms of commerce underdeveloped by all except indigenous peoples. The Nagornaya Mine JSC was the largest mining company in the district and extracted nearly 300,000 tons of coal during 2005. Other industries included the Federal State Enterprise, Bering Sea Port, which is one of the main cargo processing center in the autonomous okrug after Anadyr and Pevek, and the Bering Beer and Beverage Plant, although it filed for bankruptcy.

Although medium to heavy industry dominated the district, and traditional economic drivers remained underdeveloped, the high percentage of indigenous Chukchi (around 40%) allowed three farms, centered around three separate rural localities, to carry on traditional reindeer farming and husbandry as well as farming a variety of other traditional animals.

== Status changes ==
Before May 2008, Beringovsky Administrative District was municipally incorporated as Beringovsky Municipal District. In May 2008, Anadyrsky and Beringovsky Municipal Districts were merged, forming an enlarged Tsentralny Municipal District. This change, however, did not affect the administrative aspect of these districts. Both Anadyrsky and Beringovsky Administrative Districts continued to exist separately. In October 2008, the law mandating the change was amended and the name Tsentralny was discarded with the combined municipal district being renamed Anadyrsky Municipal District.

Beringovsky Administrative District was itself merged into Anadyrsky Administrative District effective June 13, 2011.

== Divisions ==
=== Administrative divisions ===
Beringovsky Administrative District had administrative jurisdiction over one urban-type settlement (Beringovsky) and three rural localities: Alkatvaam, Khatyrka, and Meynypilgyno.

=== Municipal divisions ===
Beringovsky Municipal District was abolished in 2008, and all of the municipal formations previously within the district became a part of Anadyrsky Municipal District.
