= Tretya Rechka =

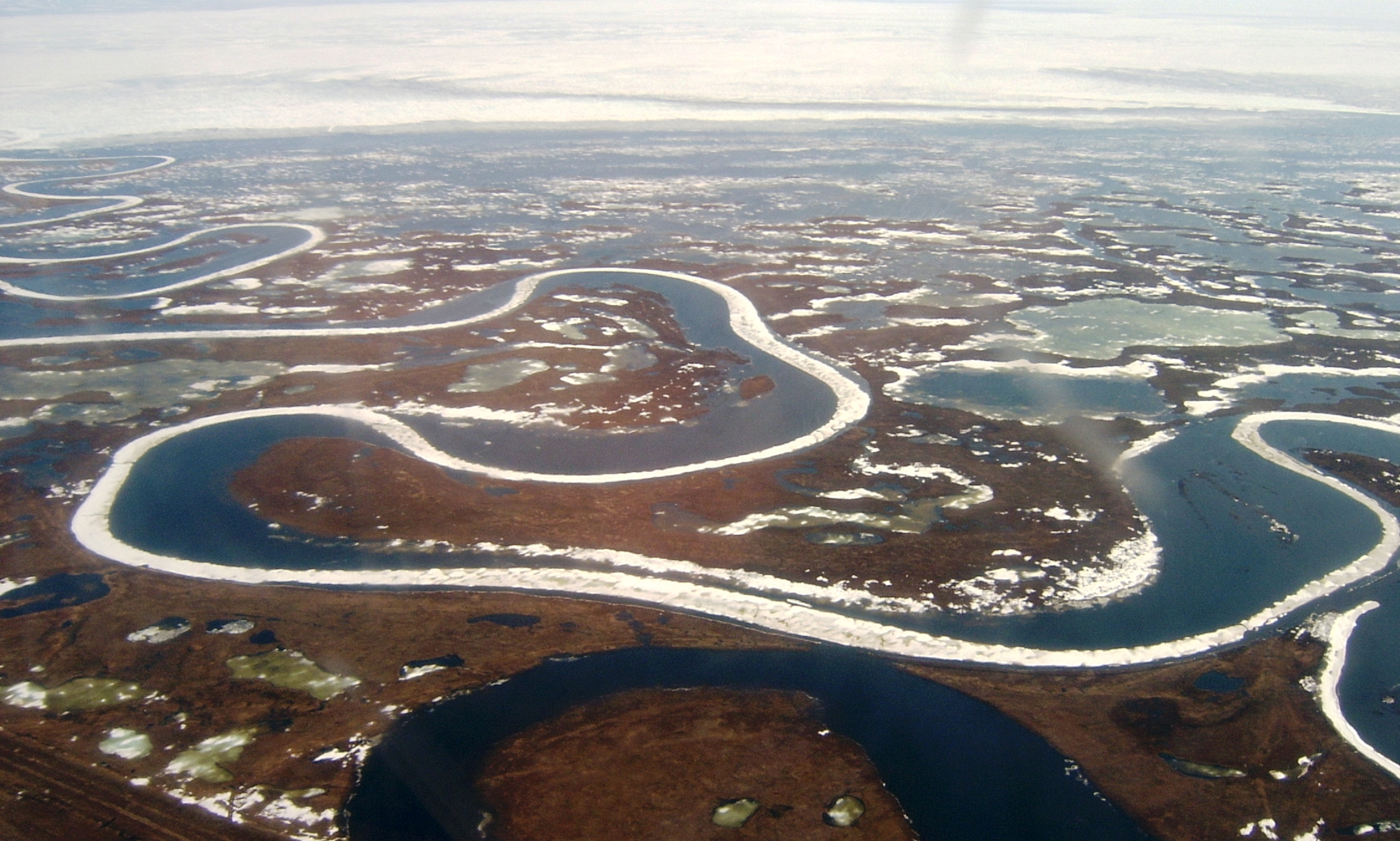
- Tretya Rechka from the air

Location
- Country: Russia

Physical characteristics
- Mouth: Bering Sea
  - location: Gulf of Anadyr
  - coordinates: 64°20′12″N 177°37′23″E
- Length: 99 km (62 mi)

The Tretya Rechka (Russian: Третья речка, literal translation: "third river") is a stream in the Beringovsky District of Chukotka Autonomous Okrug, Russia. It is 99 kilometres (62 mi) long. It drains part of the southern Anadyr Lowlands (very flat with wetlands and tundra). It flows northeast and then northwest into the Anadyr Estuary (its mouth is the southernmost notch on the image on that page). To the east of the Tretya is the Avtatkuul zakaznik protected area. To the south is the Tumanskaya.

Belugas are common in its waters.
