= Shakhtyorsky =

Shakhtyorsky (Russian: Шахтёрский; masculine), Shakhtyorskaya (Шахтёрская; feminine), or Shakhtyorskoye (Шахтёрское; neuter) is the name of several inhabited localities in Russia.

== Modern localities ==
Urban localities

- Shakhtyorsky, Chukotka Autonomous Okrug, an urban-type settlement in Anadyrsky District of Chukotka Autonomous Okrug

Rural localities

- Shakhtyorsky, Novgorod Oblast, a settlement in Sushanskoye Settlement of Borovichsky District of Novgorod Oblast
- Shakhtyorsky, Primorsky Krai, a selo in Khasansky District of Primorsky Krai
- Shakhtyorsky, Bogoroditsky District, Tula Oblast, a khutor in Shakhtersky Rural Okrug of Bogoroditsky District of Tula Oblast
- Shakhtyorsky, Kimovsky District, Tula Oblast, a settlement in Zubovsky Rural Okrug of Kimovsky District of Tula Oblast
- Shakhtyorsky, Shchyokinsky District, Tula Oblast, a settlement in Zhitovskaya Rural Administration of Shchyokinsky District of Tula Oblast
- Shakhtyorsky, Suvorovsky District, Tula Oblast, a settlement under the administrative jurisdiction of the urban-type settlement of Ageyevo in Suvorovsky District of Tula Oblast

== Abolished localities ==
- Shakhtyorsky, Donskoy, Tula Oblast, a former urban-type settlement in Tula Oblast, Russia; since 2005—a part of the town of Donskoy
