= Meynypilgyno =

Meynypilgyno Мейныпильгыно Мэйӈыпиԓгын (Chukchi)
- Selo
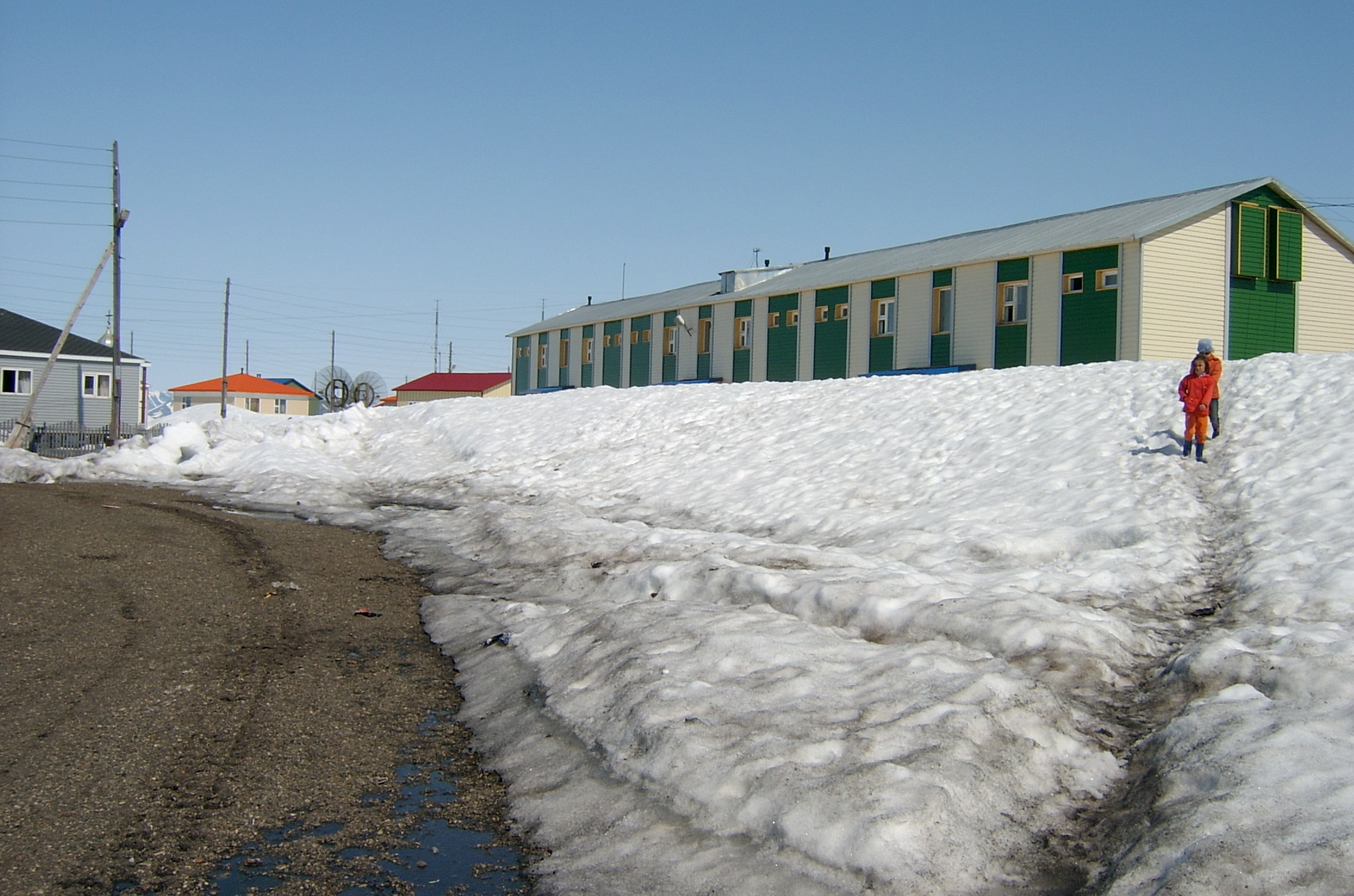
- Scene from Meynypilgyno
- Interactive map of Meynypilgyno
- Location of Meynypilgyno Meynypilgyno (Chukotka Autonomous Okrug)
- Coordinates: 62°35′N 176°54′E
- Country: Russia
- Federal subject: Chukotka Autonomous Okrug
- Administrative district: Anadyrsky District
- Founded: 1957

Area
  - Total: 1.5 km^{2} (0.58 sq mi)

Population (2010 Census)
  - Total: 424
  - Estimate (January 2018): 333 (−21.5%)
  - Density: 280/km^{2} (730/sq mi)

Municipal status
  - Municipal district: Anadyrsky Municipal District
  - Rural settlement: Meynypilgyno Rural Settlement
  - Capital of: Meynypilgyno Rural Settlement
- Time zone: UTC+12 (MSK+9)
- Postal code: 689125
- Dialing code: +7 42733
- OKTMO ID: 77603474101

Meynypilgyno (Russian: Мейныпильгыно; Chukot: Мэйӈыпиԓгын, Mèjňypiḷgyn) is a rural locality (a selo) in Anadyrsky District of Chukotka Autonomous Okrug, Russia, located southwest of Beringovsky. Population: 424 (2010 census); Municipally, it is incorporated as Meynypilgyno Rural Settlement.

== History ==
The village was founded in 1957 by Pavel Nypevi, after whom one of the village streets is named. Between 2003 and 2005 there was a general refurbishment of the village where all of the old buildings and houses were torn down and new ones erected in their place.

== Geography ==
Meynypilgyno is located on the shores of the Bering Sea, on a spit by the between Lake Vaamochka (Chukot: Ваамъечгын, meaning the "meeting of rivers") and Lake Pekulney. The word Meynypilgyno means "The Mouth" as the village is situated on the Mayn Channel which connects the Lagoon with the sea.

== Demographics and economy ==
The village is a small settlement on the shore of the Bering Sea, population as of 2010: 424, of whom 189 were male and 235 female, a slight reduction on a 2003 estimate of 464, of which around 88% were of indigenous origin. Given the proximity of the settlement to the sea, fishing is the primary means of employment in the village and there is a fish processing plant attached to the village.

As with many Chukotkan villages, there are strong efforts made to keep the traditions of the indigenous peoples alive and, although Meynypilgyno has modern facilities in the shape of a hospital, post office, high school and daycare centre, there is also a traditional Chukchi ensemble and cultural centre as well as an Orthodox chapel. In addition, residents still erect Yarangas along the coast in the summer.

There is a museum in the village established by Salikh Sharafovich Ziabbarov, dedicated to local ethnography and culture. This museum was recently awarded the status of State Museum.

== Administrative vs. municipal jurisdiction ==
Until July 2008, Meynypilgyno was a part of both Beringovsky Municipal and Beringovsky Administrative District. In May 2008, Beringovsky Municipal District was merged into Anadyrsky Municipal District (the administrative centre of which is Anadyr); however, this change did not affect the borders of Beringovsky Administrative District. Meynypilgyno continued to belong administratively to the latter until June 2011, when Beringovsky Administrative District was merged into Anadyrsky Administrative District and ceased to exist.

== Climate ==
Meynypilgyno has a Tundra climate (ET) because the warmest month has an average temperature between 0 °C (32 °F) and 10 °C (50 °F).

Climate data for Meynypilgyno
Month	Jan	Feb	Mar	Apr	May	Jun	Jul	Aug	Sep	Oct	Nov	Dec	Year
Mean daily maximum °C (°F)	−10.3 (13.5)	−12.3 (9.9)	−10.0 (14.0)	−5.8 (21.6)	2.1 (35.8)	7.5 (45.5)	10.2 (50.4)	11.1 (52.0)	7.5 (45.5)	0.0 (32.0)	−7.6 (18.3)	−10.0 (14.0)	−1.5 (29.4)
Daily mean °C (°F)	−12.3 (9.9)	−14.5 (5.9)	−12.0 (10.4)	−7.9 (17.8)	0.2 (32.4)	5.2 (41.4)	8.3 (46.9)	8.9 (48.0)	5.2 (41.4)	−2.0 (28.4)	−9.5 (14.9)	−12.0 (10.4)	−3.5 (25.6)
Mean daily minimum °C (°F)	−14.3 (6.3)	−16.7 (1.9)	−13.9 (7.0)	−10.8 (12.6)	−1.7 (28.9)	2.9 (37.2)	6.3 (43.3)	6.7 (44.1)	2.8 (37.0)	−4.0 (24.8)	−11.3 (11.7)	−13.9 (7.0)	−5.7 (21.8)
Average precipitation mm (inches)	39.0 (1.54)	33.0 (1.30)	24.0 (0.94)	24.0 (0.94)	30.0 (1.18)	36.0 (1.42)	51.0 (2.01)	63.0 (2.48)	33.0 (1.30)	42.0 (1.65)	33.0 (1.30)	45.0 (1.77)	453 (17.83)
Average snowy days	14.0	12.0	11.0	10.0	10.0	1.0	0.0	0.0	1.0	6.0	10.0	14.0	89
Source: Weather Atlas

== See also ==
- List of inhabited localities in Anadyrsky District
