= Onemen Bay =

Bay of the Bering Sea

- Онемен / Onmyn
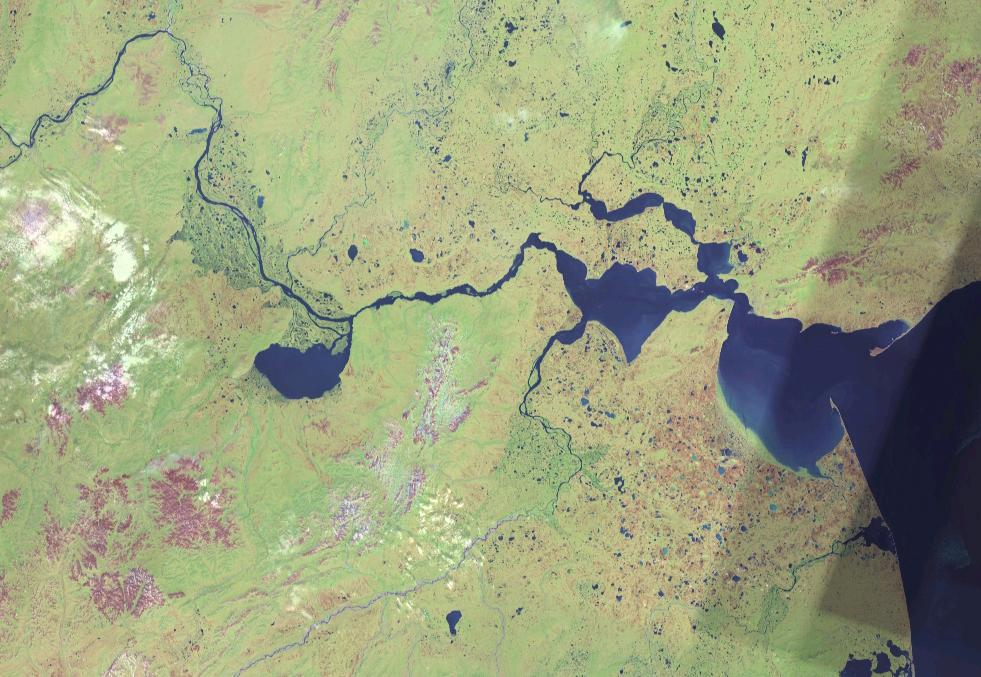
- View of the area with Onemen Bay roughly in the middle.

- Location in Chukotka Autonomous Okrug, Russia
- Location: Arctic
- Coordinates: 64°42′58″N 176°43′43″E
- River sources: Anadyr River
- Ocean/sea sources: Anadyr Estuary; Gulf of Anadyr, Bering Sea
- Basin countries: Russia
- Max. length: 40 km (25 mi)
- Max. width: 5 km (3.1 mi)
- Average depth: 20 m (66 ft)
- Settlements: Tavayvaam

Onemen Bay (Russian: Залив Онемен, Zaliv Onmen; Chukot: Онмын, Onmyn) is a bay of the Gulf of Anadyr, Bering Sea. Administratively it belongs to the Anadyrsky District of the Chukotka Autonomous Okrug, Russia. There are no settlements on the shores of the bay except for Tavayvaam at the eastern end. Anadyr is located to the east, past the mouth area.

== Geography ==
The bay lies on the shores of the Anadyr Lowlands, with the mouth of the Anadyr River to the west, the Anadyr Estuary to the east, and the Kanchalan Bay, a small estuary part of the mouth of the Kanchalan River, on the northern part of the eastern end. The Velikaya River has its mouth to the south of the bay.
