= Anadyr Lowlands =

Plain in Tsjoekotka, Russian Far East

Anadyr Lowlands Анадырская низменность (Russian)
- Alluvial plain
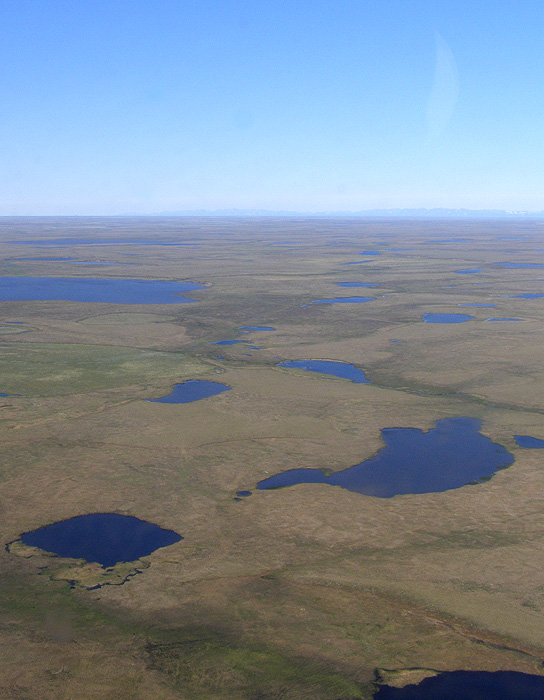
- View of the Anadyr Lowlands from the air.

- Location in Chukotka, Russian Far East
- Coordinates: 64°58′N 175°30′E
- Location: Chukotka Autonomous Okrug, Russia

The Anadyr Lowlands (Russian: Ана́дырская ни́зменность) are a low alluvial plain located in the Chukotka Autonomous Okrug, Far Eastern Federal District, Russia.

== Geography ==
The lowlands are crossed by the Anadyr River in the middle and the Velikaya in the south. They are bound by the Pekulney Range of the Chukotka Mountains to the northwest, west of which lie the Parapol-Belsky Lowlands (Парапольско-Бельская низменность) beyond which rise the Anadyr Highlands, and by the Rarytkin and Ukvushvuynen ranges of the Koryak Mountains to the south.

The mouth of the Anadyr River flows into the Anadyr Gulf of the Bering Sea to the east. The harbor city of Anadyr is located by the mouth on the shore of Onemen Bay in the estuarine area of the river.

The lowlands are a flat, mostly marshy tundra plain with a maximum height of 100 metres (330 ft) above sea level. The whole area is dotted with lakes, the largest of which are Krasnoye and Yanragytgyn. Besides the Anadyr, rivers Velikaya, Tumanskaya, Tretya and Kanchalan, flow across the lowlands. A few isolated small mountain ranges rise above the plain, such as the Ushkany, Zolotoy and Dionysia ranges.

Geologically the Anadyr Lowlands are composed of loose Quaternary sediments, constrained by permafrost.
