= Alkatvaam =

Alkatvaam Алькатваам Ыʼԓкытвээм (Chukchi)
- Selo
- Interactive map of Alkatvaam
- Location of Alkatvaam Alkatvaam (Chukotka Autonomous Okrug)
- Coordinates: 63°07′44″N 179°01′50″E
- Country: Russia
- Federal subject: Chukotka Autonomous Okrug
- Administrative district: Anadyrsky District
- Founded: 1953
- Elevation: 32 m (105 ft)

Population (2010 Census)
  - Total: 299
  - Estimate (January 2018): 210 (−29.8%)

Municipal status
  - Municipal district: Anadyrsky Municipal District
  - Rural settlement: Alkatvaam Rural Settlement
  - Capital of: Alkatvaam Rural Settlement
- Time zone: UTC+12 (MSK+9)
- Postal code: 689125
- Dialing code: +7 42733
- OKTMO ID: 77603470101

Alkatvaam (Russian: Алькатваам; Chukot: Ыʼԓкытвээм, romanized: Y’ḷkytwēm, pronounced [əˀʎkətˈweːm]) is a rural locality (a selo) in Anadyrsky District of Chukotka Autonomous Okrug, Russia. It had a population of 299 (2010 census); however, as of 1 January 2015, its population was estimated to be around 263. It is located on the Alkatvaam River west of Beringovsky. Municipally, it is incorporated as Alkatvaam Rural Settlement.

== Demographics ==
Alkatvaam is a small settlement, with a 2010 census population of 299, of whom 158 were male and 141 female, a significant decrease on a 2003 population estimate of 381 inhabitants. It is populated mainly by indigenous Chukchi (around 90%).

== Economy ==
The village has been provided with a number of modern amenities including a general store, a school, a hospital, a kindergarten, a cultural centre, and a utilities enterprise (effectively the remains of a Soviet-era kolkhoz). Near to the village is a new project to develop large coal deposits.

== Culture ==
The modern facilities are paired with a traditional ensemble and regular celebration of all traditional festivals. The ensemble "Olyenyenok" (lit. Deer) come from the village. They have been established for over 40 years and have performed many times both across Chukotka and beyond.

== Administrative vs. municipal jurisdiction ==
Until July 2008, Alkatvaam was a part of both Beringovsky Municipal and Beringovsky Administrative District. In May 2008, Beringovsky Municipal District was merged into Anadyrsky Municipal District (the administrative centre of which is Anadyr); however, this change did not affect the borders of Beringovsky Administrative District. Alkatvaam continued to belong administratively to the latter until June 2011, when Beringovsky Administrative District was merged into Anadyrsky Administrative District and ceased to exist.

== Climate ==
Alkatvaam has a polar climate (Köppen climate classification ET) with bitterly cold, very long and snowy winters and cool, short summers.

Climate data for Alkatvaam
Month	Jan	Feb	Mar	Apr	May	Jun	Jul	Aug	Sep	Oct	Nov	Dec	Year
Record high °C (°F)	3.3 (37.9)	3.4 (38.1)	5.4 (41.7)	4.6 (40.3)	9.1 (48.4)	22.8 (73.0)	27.4 (81.3)	27.5 (81.5)	17.7 (63.9)	10.8 (51.4)	6.2 (43.2)	1.8 (35.2)	27.5 (81.5)
Mean daily maximum °C (°F)	−13.0 (8.6)	−14.5 (5.9)	−13.2 (8.2)	−7.7 (18.1)	0.3 (32.5)	7.9 (46.2)	12.6 (54.7)	11.8 (53.2)	6.4 (43.5)	−0.9 (30.4)	−8.1 (17.4)	−11.1 (12.0)	−2.5 (27.5)
Daily mean °C (°F)	−14.9 (5.2)	−16.3 (2.7)	−15.0 (5.0)	−9.8 (14.4)	−1.3 (29.7)	5.3 (41.5)	9.8 (49.6)	9.4 (48.9)	4.3 (39.7)	−2.7 (27.1)	−10.0 (14.0)	−13.0 (8.6)	−4.5 (23.9)
Mean daily minimum °C (°F)	−16.7 (1.9)	−18.0 (−0.4)	−16.8 (1.8)	−11.8 (10.8)	−2.9 (26.8)	2.6 (36.7)	6.9 (44.4)	6.9 (44.4)	2.2 (36.0)	−4.5 (23.9)	−11.9 (10.6)	−14.8 (5.4)	−6.6 (20.1)
Record low °C (°F)	−34.1 (−29.4)	−32.8 (−27.0)	−31.0 (−23.8)	−25.0 (−13.0)	−16.9 (1.6)	−3.4 (25.9)	0.4 (32.7)	0.0 (32.0)	−7.9 (17.8)	−21.0 (−5.8)	−27.0 (−16.6)	−32.0 (−25.6)	−34.1 (−29.4)
Average precipitation mm (inches)	57 (2.2)	39 (1.5)	24 (0.9)	27 (1.1)	27 (1.1)	27 (1.1)	39 (1.5)	60 (2.4)	60 (2.4)	54 (2.1)	66 (2.6)	63 (2.5)	543 (21.4)
Average snowy days	19	14	15	15	17	3	0	0	4	17	20	20	144

== See also ==
- List of inhabited localities in Anadyrsky District
