= Lake Pekulney =

Lake in the country of Russia

- Пекульнейское озеро (Russian)
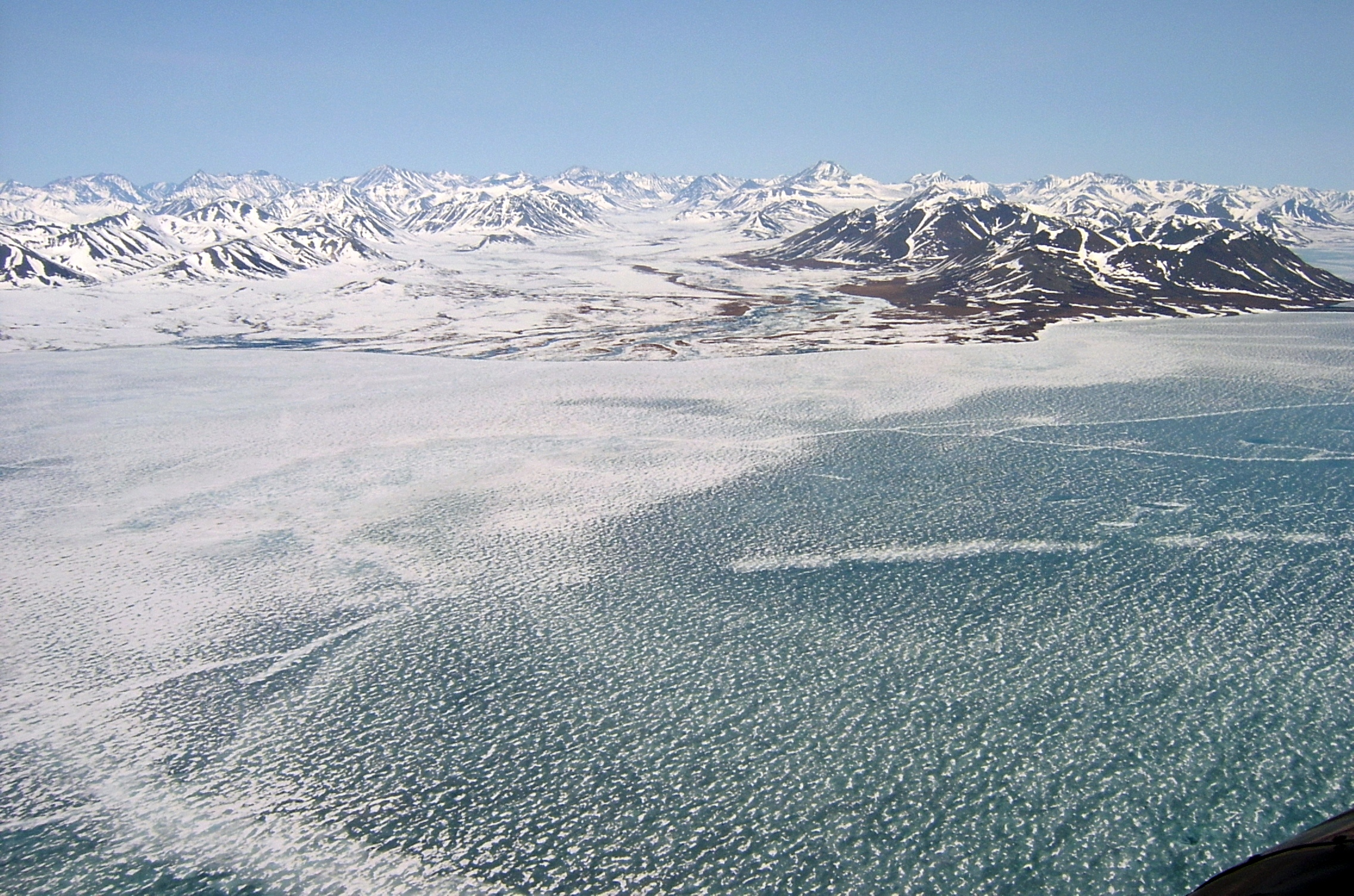

- Location within Chukotka Autonomous Okrug
- Location: Anadyr District, Chukotka Autonomous Okrug
- Coordinates: 62°38′N 177°11′E
- Primary inflows: Pekulveyem, Kakanaut and Kavtayo
- Primary outflows: Main Channel
- Basin countries: Russia
- Max. length: 34 km (21 mi)
- Max. width: 21 km (13 mi)
- Surface area: 435 km^{2} (168 sq mi)
- Max. depth: 10 m (33 ft)
- Surface elevation: 0.7 m (2 ft 4 in)

Lake Pekulney (Russian: Пекульнейское озеро) is a lake of Anadyr District, Chukotka Autonomous Okrug, Russia. The lake has a basin area of 435 km^{2} (168 sq mi) which makes it the second largest lake in the Chukotka Autonomous Okrug after Lake Krasnoye, and the 27th largest in area in Russia.

There are commercial fisheries of sockeye salmon in the lake.

The Kakanaut Formation is a geological formation named after the small river flowing into the lake at the head of its northeastern bay.

== Geography ==
Lake Pekulney is a coastal lagoon separated from the sea by a narrow spit at its southern end. It is roughly Y-shaped with Pekulveyem Bay in the northwest and Kakanaut Bay in the northeast. The Mayn Channel flows from it in the south connecting it with the Bering Sea.

Pekulney Lake is connected by channels with neighboring Lake Vaamochka to the west. The village of Meynypilgyno is located between both lakes, 3 km (1.9 mi) to the southwest of Lake Pekulney. The inner part of the lake has a fjord-like structure, with the mountains of the Ukvushvuynen Range, one of the foothills of the Koryak Mountains rising steeply from the shores of the lake's northern end, while the coast of the southern part is smooth and low. The banks are covered with tundra vegetation.

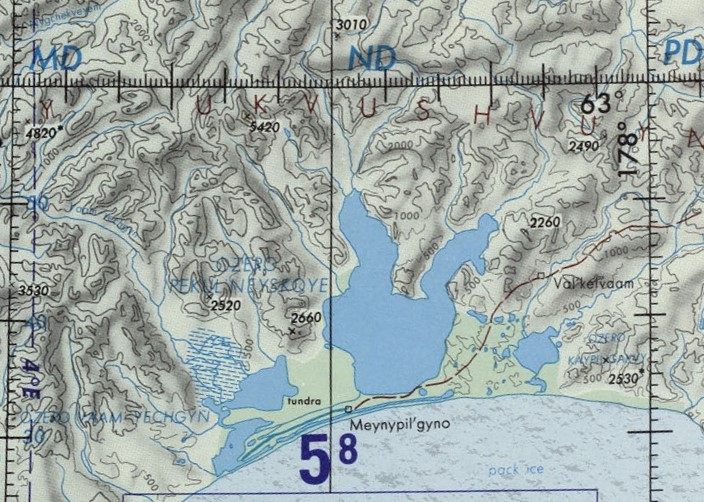
Lake Pekulney map section

== See also ==
- List of lakes of Russia
