= Diomid Dzyuban =

Russian bishop (1961–2021)

Diomid Dzyuban (Russian: Диомид Дзюбан), born Sergey Ivanovich Dzyuban (Сергей Иванович Дзюбан; 24 June 1961 – 20 November 2021), was a bishop of the Russian Orthodox Church. He was the bishop of Anadyr and Chukotka from August 2000 to June 2008. He was also the formal leader of the extremely small non-canonical religious group "Holy Governing Synod of the Russian Orthodox Church".

Diomid was known for his views condemning ecumenism, taxpayer ID, cell phones, new passports, vaccination and globalisation. He believed that the leaders of the Russian Orthodox Church have "departed from the purity of the Orthodoxal dogma" in its support of the Russian government and of democracy, as well as its ecumenism with other confessions.

== Biography ==
Sergey Dzyuban was born in Kadiivka, Ukrainian SSR. He graduated from the Kharkiv Radio-Electronics Institute in 1983 and worked as an engineer in the Kharkiv Construction-Technological Bureau.

In 1987, he was tonsured a monk (as Diomid) at the Trinity Lavra of St. Sergius north of Moscow by Archimandrite Alexis (Kutepov) (now Metropolitan of Tula and Efremov). Diomid completed study at the Moscow Theological Seminary in 1989 and began studies at the Moscow Theological Academy that same year, completing study there in 1993.

He was ordained a hieromonk by Patriarch Alexy II of Moscow on 1 September 1991. In 1993, he became a hegumen, and from 1992–2000 he was priest at the Church of Assumption of the Mother of God in the Kamchatka Eparchy. In June 2001 he was named archimandrite, and two months later was consecrated bishop of Anadyr.

Due to his insubordination and alleged heretical views, he was provisionally suspended from his episcopate on 28 June 2008 by the Bishops Council of the Holy Synod of the Moscow Patriarchate for "supporting the violation of canonical norms and introducing temptation into the life of the Church". The Synod decreed that its ruling would come into full effect if Diomid did not repent and cease such activities by the next meeting of the Synod (whose traditional July meeting is on the day of St. Sergius of Radonezh. Despite the decree, the next day, Diomid celebrated a Divine Liturgy at the Cathedral in Anadyr and said he had nothing to repent.

On 17 July 2008, the day of martyrdom of Tsar Nicholas II of Russia, Diomid issued a proclamation in which he anathematizes Patriarch Alexy, some bishops and all their predecessors since the February Revolution in 1917, as he considered co-existence with a republican regime an "anti-Tsar heresy"; he equally proclaimed the dioceses of Moscow and Minsk to fall vacant after this interdict. He said that he was not establishing a new church of his own and that he remained in the ROC however without obedience to its "heretic prelates".

After failing to repent or cease and desist in such activities, he was removed from the episcopate on 6 October 2008 and reduced to the status of a simple monk.

He died on 20 November 2021 in an automobile accident near St. Petersburg, at the age of 60.
