= Rarytkin Range =

Mountain range in Russia

- Ръарыткын / Рарыткин
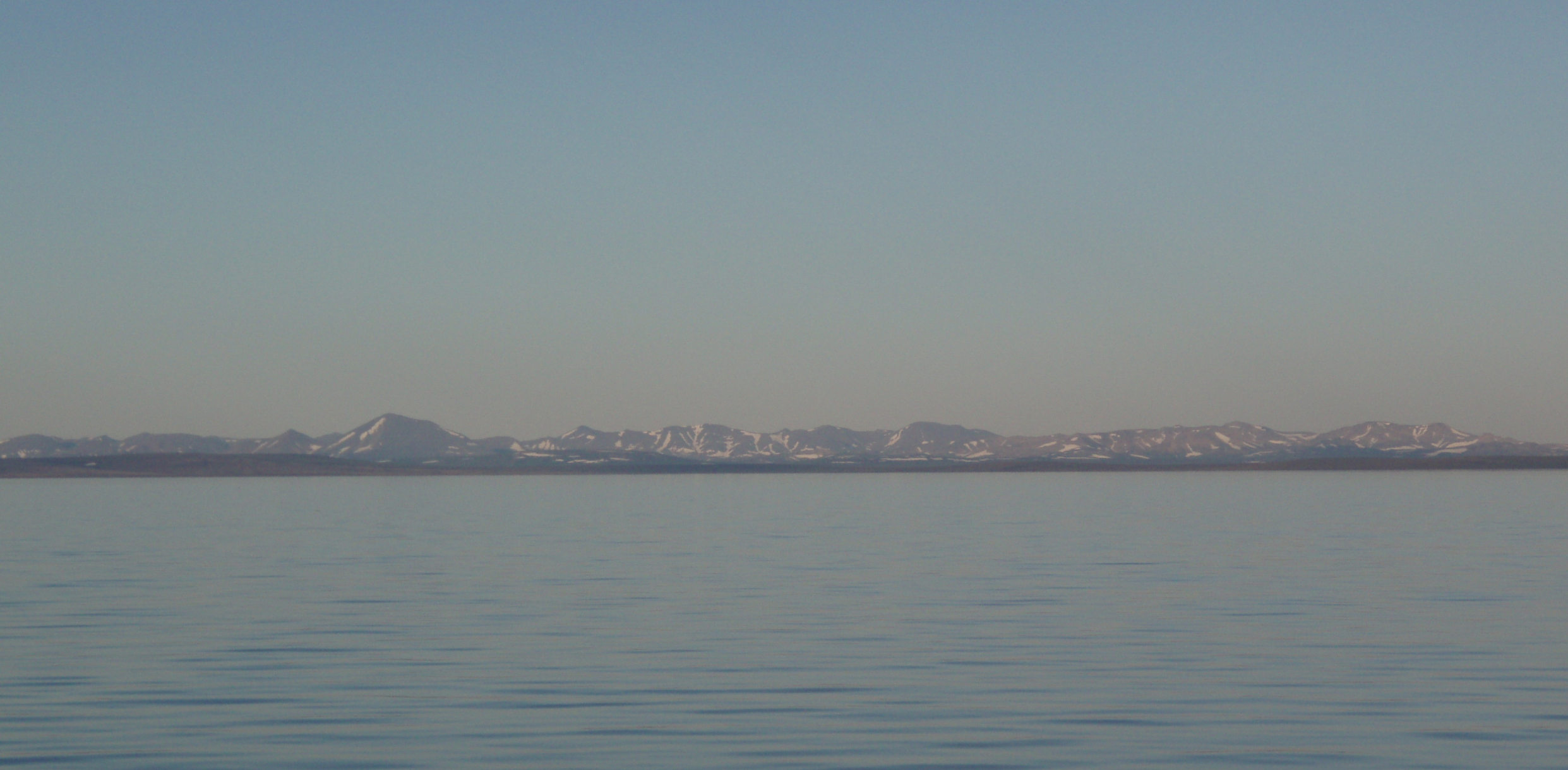
- View of the range rising beyond Lake Krasnoye.

Highest point
- Peak: Mount Palets
- Elevation: 1,085 m (3,560 ft)
- Coordinates: 64°20′N 175°20′E

Dimensions
- Length: 200 km (120 mi) NE/SW

Geography
- Location within Chukotka Autonomous Okrug
- Location: Chukotka Autonomous Okrug, Russian Far East
- Parent range: Koryak Highlands

Geology
- Orogeny: Alpine orogeny
- Rock ages: Mesozoic and Paleozoic
- Rock type(s): Sandstone, andesite, shale

Climbing
- Easiest route: From Krasneno

The Rarytkin Range (Russian: хребет Рарыткин; Chukot: Ръарыткын. Chinese: 拉雷特金岭) is a range of mountains in Chukotka Autonomous Okrug, Russian Far East. Administratively the range is part of Anadyr District.

== Geography ==
The Rarytkin Range is the northernmost subrange of the Koryak Highlands, East Siberian Mountains. It stretches roughly from southeast to northwest in southern Chukotka, along the left bank of the Velikaya River in its middle and lower course. To the northwest flows the Anadyr River and the range acts as an eastern boundary of the Anadyr Lowlands.

The highest mountain of the Rarytkin Range is 1,085 metres (3,560 ft) high Mount Palets (гора Палец). It rises in the central area of the range.

Lake Krasnoye is located at the feet of the northwestern part of the range. Rare fossil plants of the Maastrichtian and Eocene periods have been found in the range. Some of them are now kept in the Botanical Museum of the Russian Academy of Sciences.

== Flora and climate ==
There are shrub thickets of Japanese stone pine and alder in the lower mountain slopes. The upper elevations are covered with mountain tundra. The Rarytkin Range has a subarctic climate, somewhat moderated by the proximity of the ocean.

== Bibliography ==
- Michael C. Boulter, Helen Fisher eds. Cenozoic Plants and Climates of the Arctic

== See also ==
- Kakanaut Formation
