= Maynits =

Lake of Chukotka Autonomous Okrug

- Майниц / Майныгытгын
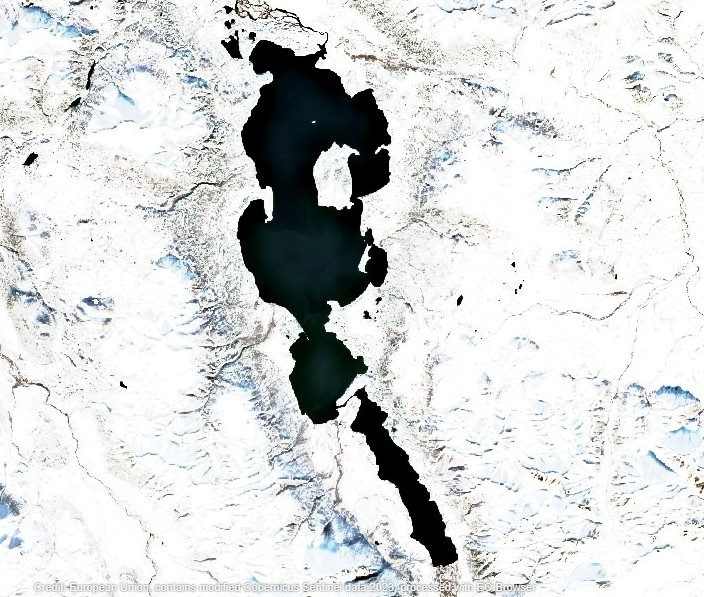
- Sentinel-2 image of the lake in early October before freezing

- Location in Chukotka Autonomous Okrug, Russian Far East
- Location: Chukotka Autonomous Okrug
- Coordinates: 63°15′05″N 176°42′18″E
- Type: Alpine
- Primary inflows: Gytgypokytkynvaam and Yergisguigyveem
- Primary outflows: Gytgyveem
- Catchment area: 569 km^{2} (220 sq mi)
- Basin countries: Russia
- Max. length: 20 km (12 mi)
- Max. width: 5.2 km (3.2 mi)
- Surface area: 48.8 km^{2} (18.8 sq mi)
- Max. depth: ca 100 m (0.062 mi)
- Shore length^{1}: 62 km (203,000 ft)
- Surface elevation: 120 m (390 ft)
- Islands: yes
- ^{1} Shore length is not a well-defined measure.

Maynits (Russian: Майниц; Chukot: Майныгытгын) is a freshwater lake in Anadyr District, Chukotka Autonomous Okrug, Russian Federation. It has an area of almost 50 km^{2} (19 sq mi). There are no permanent settlements on the shores of the lake.

The name of the lake in Chukot is derived from Mainygytgyn, meaning "big lake."

== Geography ==
Maynits lies approximately in the middle of the Ukvushvuynen Range, part of the Koryak Mountains. It is located 65 km (40 mi) southeast of lake Yanragytgyn. The lake stretches roughly from north to south and has a larger northern section with a 2.1 km (1.3 mi) long and 1.2 km (0.75 mi) wide island in the middle near the northeastern lakeshore. The smaller southern section stretches from NNW to SSE for 6.7 km (4.2 mi) and has a width of about 1 km (0.62 mi). Both sections are connected by a narrow sound.

The lakeshore is pebbly, made up of small and regular pebbles. The 34 km (21 mi) long Gytgypokytkynvaam river enters the lake from the south and the Gytgyveem, a 29 km (18 mi) long tributary of the Nygchekveem, flows out of the northern end of the main lake. Maynits freezes in October and stays under ice until June.

== Flora and fauna ==
Alder forests together with dwarf pine and dwarf birch forests grow on the mountain slopes facing the lake.

Maynits is a spawning ground for the sockeye salmon. In addition chum salmon, pink salmon, Taranets char, Dolly Varden trout, broad whitefish, humpback whitefish, round whitefish, Kamchatka grayling, pike, burbot, slimy sculpin, common minnow, and ninespine stickleback are common in the waters of the lake.

== See also ==
- List of lakes of Russia
