= Shakhtyorsky, Chukotka Autonomous Okrug =

Shakhtyorsky Шахтёрский
- Urban-type settlement (abolished)
- Interactive map of Shakhtyorsky
- Location of Shakhtyorsky Shakhtyorsky (Chukotka Autonomous Okrug)
- Coordinates: 64°47′00″N 177°35′00″E
- Country: Russia
- Federal subject: Chukotka Autonomous Okrug
- Administrative district: Anadyrsky District
- Abolished: 1998

Population
  - Estimate (June 2005): 93 )

Municipal status
  - Municipal district: Anadyrsky District
- Time zone: UTC+12 (MSK+9)
- Postal code: 689520
- OKTMO ID: 77603703907

Shakhtyorsky (Russian: Шахтёрский), is an urban-type settlement in Anadyrsky District of Chukotka Autonomous Okrug, Russia. As of 2008, it is in the process of being abolished due to it no longer being considered economically viable to continue mining in the area. Population: 328 (2002 Census); 2,968 (1989 Soviet census). As a result of the cessation of mining activities, the population of the settlement has continued to decline. By 2005, an environmental impact report prepared for the Kupol Gold Project indicated that the population of Shakhtyorsky had fallen to just 93 people.

== Geography ==
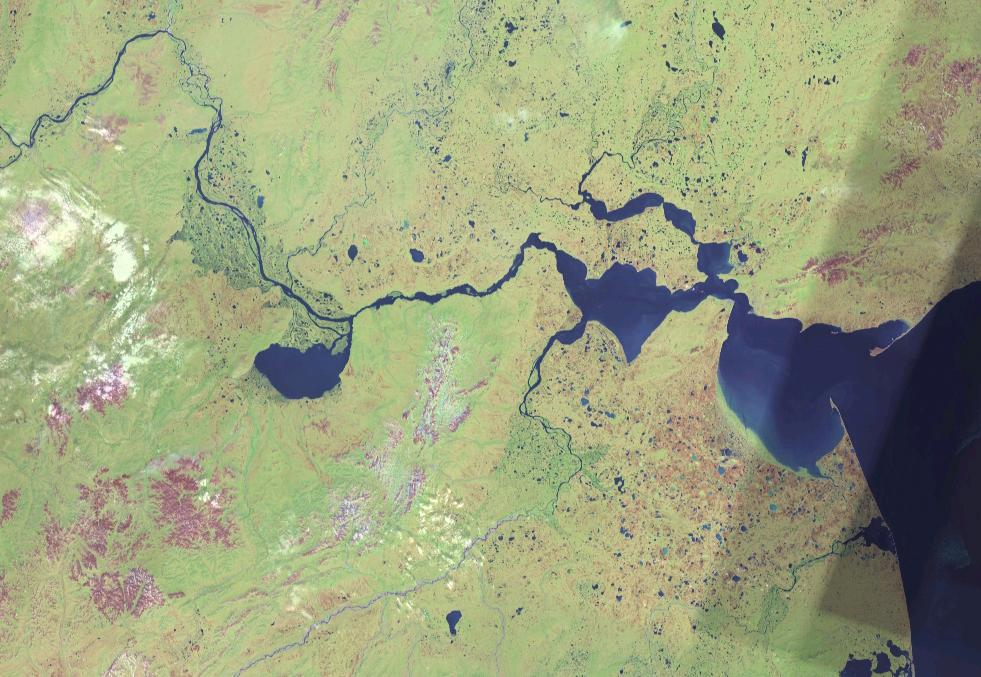
The lower Anadyr River. The Gulf of Anadyr is located on the far east of the image. Shakhtyosrky is located on the northern side of the estuary where the meeting of the Kanchalan, the Anadyr and the Velikaya create an estuary.

The settlement is located on the northern shores of the Anardyrsky Liman where the waters of the Anadyr, Kanchalan and Velikaya meet creating an estuary. It is located on the northern side of the isthmus, a few miles north west of Ugolnye Kopi and across the water from Anadyr (town), where the three main parts of the estuary, the northern series of lakes, the southern lake and the big lagoon on the east join.

The settlement is served by Ugolny Airport.

== History ==
Shakhtyorsky owes its existence to the presence of both coal and fish in the area and because of that it used to be called Kombinat (lit. Industrial Complex) in the 1950s and 1960s and was the site of the first airport in the District which was constructed in 1930. The settlement used to alternate with Ugolnye Kopi as the administrative centre of the district until 1997 when the centre was finally fixed at Ugolnye Kopi.

The mines were declared unprofitable and that there was no possibility of developing any other form of economy in 1999 and the settlement was closed along with a number of others in Chukotka. The Russian government guaranteed funds to transport non-working pensioners and the unemployed in liquidated settlements including Shakhtyorsky from Chukotka to other parts of Russia. The Ministry of railways was obliged to lease containers for the transportation of the migrants' goods to the Chukotkan administration and ensure that they were delivered to the various settlements.

== Transport ==
Shakltyorsky is connected to Ugolnye Kopi and Anadyr Ugolny Airport by a small road system as well as to the now-abandoned settlements of Chetvertiy, Zolotoy and Vtoroy however, it is separated from Anadyr by the Anadyrsky Liman, which is only accessible by ferry. There is also a small network of roads within the settlement including:

- Улица Гагарина (Ulitsa Gagarina, lit. Gagarin Street)
- Улица Геологов (Ulitsa Geologov, lit. Geologists' Street)
- Улица Елкова (Ulitsa Yelkova)
- Улица Комсомольская (Ulitsa Komsomolskaya, lit. Komsomol Street)
- Улица Набережная (Ulitsa Naberezhnaya, lit. Quay Street)
- Улица Нефтяников (Ulitsa Neftyanikov, lit. Oil Workers' Street)
- Улица Почтовая (Ulitsa Pochtovaya, lit. Postal Street)
- Улица Радиоцентр (Ulitsa Radiotsentr, lit. Central Radio Street)
- Улица Титова (Ulitsa Titova)
- Улица Тундровая (Ulitsa Tundrovaya, lit. Tundra Street)
- Улица Центральная (Ulitsa Tsentralnaya, lit. Central Street)
- Улица Чкалова (Ulitsa Chkalova)
- Улица Школьная (Ulitsa Shkolnaya, lit. School Street)

== Climate ==
Shakhtyorsky has a Tundra climate (ET) because the warmest month has an average temperature between 0 °C (32 °F) and 10 °C (50 °F).

Climate data for Shakhtyorsky, Chukotka Autonomous Okrug
| Month | Jan | Feb | Mar | Apr | May | Jun | Jul | Aug | Sep | Oct | Nov | Dec | Year |
|---|---|---|---|---|---|---|---|---|---|---|---|---|---|
| Record high °C (°F) | 1.2 (34.2) | 2.2 (36.0) | 5.1 (41.2) | 5 (41) | 14 (57) | 26 (79) | 28 (82) | 25.6 (78.1) | 23.4 (74.1) | 10.8 (51.4) | 5 (41) | 3.6 (38.5) | 28 (82) |
| Mean daily maximum °C (°F) | −19.7 (−3.5) | −17.4 (0.7) | −14.5 (5.9) | −8.2 (17.2) | 2 (36) | 11.2 (52.2) | 15.8 (60.4) | 13.7 (56.7) | 7.9 (46.2) | −1.8 (28.8) | −8.9 (16.0) | −16.6 (2.1) | −3 (27) |
| Mean daily minimum °C (°F) | −26.6 (−15.9) | −24.6 (−12.3) | −21.8 (−7.2) | −15.7 (3.7) | −3.8 (25.2) | 3.8 (38.8) | 8.8 (47.8) | 7.5 (45.5) | 2.1 (35.8) | −7.1 (19.2) | −15.7 (3.7) | −23.4 (−10.1) | −9.7 (14.5) |
| Record low °C (°F) | −44 (−47) | −44.1 (−47.4) | −39 (−38) | −32.5 (−26.5) | −22.5 (−8.5) | −5.7 (21.7) | −12.1 (10.2) | −5 (23) | −10.4 (13.3) | −25.3 (−13.5) | −35.8 (−32.4) | −40 (−40) | −44.1 (−47.4) |
| Average rainfall mm (inches) | 41.7 (1.64) | 44.8 (1.76) | 32.7 (1.29) | 24.5 (0.96) | 16.1 (0.63) | 24.9 (0.98) | 42.2 (1.66) | 44.9 (1.77) | 37.1 (1.46) | 28.5 (1.12) | 38.7 (1.52) | 32.3 (1.27) | 408.4 (16.08) |
| Average snowy days | 15 | 14 | 13 | 15 | 14 | 1 | 0 | 0 | 3 | 16 | 18 | 15 | 124 |

== See also ==
- List of inhabited localities in Anadyrsky District
