= Hope Race =

Former sporting event in the United States and Russia

The Hope Race or Hope Sled Dog Race is a defunct sled dog race between Nome, Alaska and Anadyr, Russia, across the Bering Strait. The race was established in 1991, shortly after the fall of the Soviet Union, and according to information on the race's (now inactive) website, the race was run as recently as 2004. Racers covered 1000 miles, but did not actually race across the Bering Strait. Teams instead were shipped across the strait on boats and raced on land. In 1995, Alaska musher Bob Holder became the only person to compete in the Hope Race, Iditarod Trail Sled Dog Race, and Yukon Quest in the same year.
