= Tavayvaam =

Tavayvaam Тавайваам
- Selo
- Interactive map of Tavayvaam
- Location of Tavayvaam Tavayvaam (Chukotka Autonomous Okrug)
- Coordinates: 64°45′N 177°22′E
- Country: Russia
- Federal subject: Chukotka Autonomous Okrug

Population (2010 Census)
  - Total: 472
  - Estimate (January 2018): 487 (+3.2%)

Administrative status
  - Subordinated to: Town of okrug significance of Anadyr

Municipal status
  - Urban okrug: Anadyr Urban Okrug
- Time zone: UTC+12 (MSK+9)
- Postal code: 689534
- OKTMO ID: 77701000106

Tavayvaam (Russian: Тавайва́ам) is a rural locality (a selo) under the administrative jurisdiction of the town of okrug significance of Anadyr in Chukotka Autonomous Okrug, Russia. Within the framework of municipal divisions, it is a part of Anadyr Urban Okrug. Its population of 472 (as of the 2010 Census) is predominantly indigenous Chukchi and Yupik people.

== Geography ==
The settlement is located in the mouth area of Onemen Bay.

== Etymology ==
The locality's name is of Chukchi origin and literally means river on which one rides.

== Economy ==
The economy is driven primarily by traditional activities. Reindeer farming used to be the main occupation, but following the economic crisis caused by the dissolution of the Soviet Union all the reindeer owned by the residents were lost. The effects of this loss can still be seen as around 20% of the population are unemployed. The lack of reindeer mean that the economy is instead now supported by fishing, seasonal labor, and the production of traditional indigenous crafts for sale to tourists and to the population of nearby Anadyr.

=== Soviet era ===
During the Soviet period, Tavayvaam's main economic focus was the state farm. Originally, the farm was called "Stalin" (after Joseph Stalin), but following his death the name was changed to "Twenty-Second Party Congress" Reindeer herding was the predominant occupation for the farm and at its most prosperous point during the 1970s there were up to ten separate brigades operating at any one time out in the tundra, tending to over 27,000 reindeer. This farm employed the majority of Tavayvaam's population. Individuals not directly involved in the herding of reindeer were employed in sewing workshops where the skin of the reindeer would be used, or in the fish processing plant attached to the farm. It was the indigenous population that did all of the manual, practical work; the incomers were those who filled administrative or support positions. During the summer, children would live with their families on the tundra following the reindeer, only returning at the start of a new academic year to attend school. Beyond this steady employment, the fur and meat from the reindeer and other game, as well as mushrooms and berries foraged, provided a vital source of sustenance for Tavayvaam's residents.

=== Post-Soviet era ===
Following the dissolution of the Soviet Union, Boris Yeltsin initiated the privatization of all state-run enterprises. Tavayvaam's state farm was technically dissolved, although the residents continued to refer to it as such, so key to their life it had been. In its place, four private enterprises (Chirynai, Kenkeren, Eupolian, and Topolovoye) were established. Unfortunately, it was not a case of business as usual for the four new enterprises. Normally, when a state enterprise was privatized, there would be some form of remnant that would ensure a degree of economic continuity, but in this case, upon the dissolution of the state farm the assets were simply divided amongst the four new enterprises and the state element disappeared entirely. The indigenous people now running these private enterprises were completely unprepared for the demands of a free market environment. By 1995, the total number of reindeer owned by the combined enterprises had fallen by nearly two-thirds from the total recorded in 1985, and by 1998, all four enterprises had closed permanently as there were no reindeer herds left. Smaller industries like the sewing workshops had closed as well.

It is claimed that the town of Anadyr annexed the "ethnic village" of Tavayvaam in May 1994, and that this was done by then governor Alexander Nazarov with a view to saving money from the autonomous okrug budget. If the national village had indeed been absorbed into the town of Anadyr then there would have been no obligation for the autonomous okrug to allocate specific funds for the indigenous population there.

== Demographics and culture ==
Tavayvaam has a status of an "ethnic village", namely a "place of compact residence of small-numbered peoples of the north". Whereas Anadyr had an indigenous population of around 8.5% in 2005, Tavayvaam had an indigenous population of around 78%. Tavayvaam preserves its indigenous culture through the Chukchi language Club Murgin Vetgav and a native crafts society.

== Climate ==
Tavayvaam has a subarctic taiga climate (Köppen climate classification Dfc). with very cold, long winters and short, mild summers.

Climate data for Tavayvaam
Month	Jan	Feb	Mar	Apr	May	Jun	Jul	Aug	Sep	Oct	Nov	Dec	Year
Record high °C (°F)	1.2 (34.2)	2.2 (36.0)	5.1 (41.2)	5.0 (41.0)	14.0 (57.2)	26.0 (78.8)	28.0 (82.4)	25.6 (78.1)	23.4 (74.1)	10.8 (51.4)	5.0 (41.0)	3.6 (38.5)	28.0 (82.4)
Mean daily maximum °C (°F)	−19.7 (−3.5)	−17.4 (0.7)	−14.5 (5.9)	−8.2 (17.2)	2.0 (35.6)	11.2 (52.2)	15.8 (60.4)	13.7 (56.7)	7.9 (46.2)	−1.8 (28.8)	−8.9 (16.0)	−16.6 (2.1)	−3.0 (26.6)
Daily mean °C (°F)	−23.1 (−9.6)	−21 (−6)	−18.1 (−0.6)	−11.9 (10.6)	−0.9 (30.4)	7.5 (45.5)	12.3 (54.1)	10.6 (51.1)	5.0 (41.0)	−4.5 (23.9)	−12.3 (9.9)	−20 (−4)	−6.4 (20.5)
Mean daily minimum °C (°F)	−26.6 (−15.9)	−24.6 (−12.3)	−21.8 (−7.2)	−15.7 (3.7)	−3.8 (25.2)	3.8 (38.8)	8.8 (47.8)	7.5 (45.5)	2.1 (35.8)	−7.1 (19.2)	−15.7 (3.7)	−23.4 (−10.1)	−9.7 (14.5)
Record low °C (°F)	−44.0 (−47.2)	−44.1 (−47.4)	−39.0 (−38.2)	−32.5 (−26.5)	−22.5 (−8.5)	−5.7 (21.7)	−0.9 (30.4)	−5.0 (23.0)	−10.4 (13.3)	−25.3 (−13.5)	−35.8 (−32.4)	−40.0 (−40.0)	−44.1 (−47.4)
Average precipitation mm (inches)	42 (1.7)	45 (1.8)	33 (1.3)	24 (0.9)	16 (0.6)	25 (1.0)	42 (1.7)	45 (1.8)	37 (1.5)	29 (1.1)	39 (1.5)	32 (1.3)	409 (16.2)
Average snowy days	15	14	13	15	14	1	0	0	3	16	18	15	124
