= Yanragytgyn =

Lake of Chukotka Autonomous Okrug

- Янрагытгын
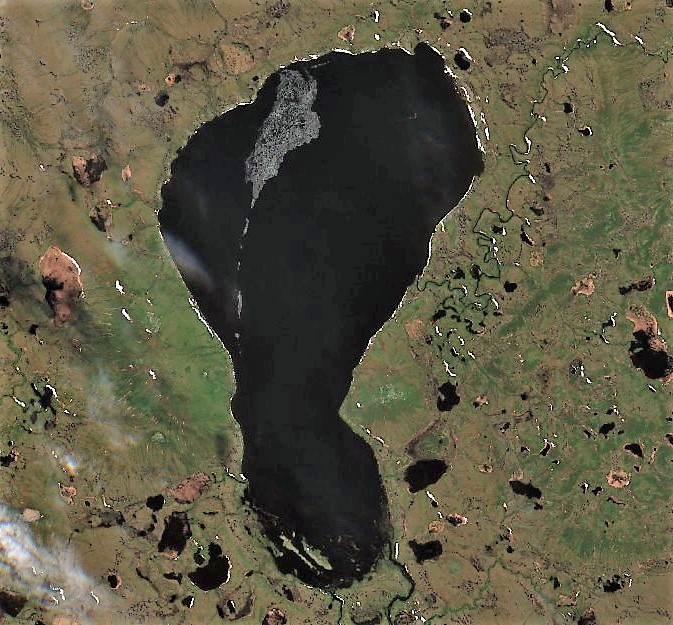
- Sentinel-2 image of the lake

- Location in Chukotka Autonomous Okrug, Russian Far East
- Location: Chukotka Autonomous Okrug
- Coordinates: 63°43′45″N 175°34′33″E
- Type: Oligotrophic
- Primary outflows: Unnamed river
- Catchment area: 95.2 km^{2} (36.8 sq mi)
- Basin countries: Russia
- Max. length: 9.3 km (5.8 mi)
- Max. width: 4.6 km (2.9 mi)
- Surface area: ca 29.1 km^{2} (11.2 sq mi)
- Surface elevation: 79 m (259 ft)
- Islands: yes

Yanragytgyn (Russian: Янрагытгын; Chukot: Янрагытгын) is a freshwater lake in Anadyr District, Chukotka Autonomous Okrug, Russian Federation. It has an area of 79 km^{2} (31 sq mi).

There are no permanent settlements on the shores of the lake.

The name of the lake in Chukot means "a separate lake."

== Geography ==
Yanragytgyn lies close to the northern slopes of the Ukvushvuynen Range, part of the Koryak Mountains. It is located 85 km (53 mi) southwest of lake Krasnoye and 65 km (40 mi) northwest of lake Maynits. The lake is roughly pear-shaped and stretches roughly from north to south. The southern section includes a few small islands close to the shore.

Yanragytgyn lies in a swampy flat area of the southwestern part of the Anadyr Lowland dotted with thermokarst lakes. An unnamed tributary of the Chirynay of the Velikaya basin, flows out of the southern lakeshore. The lake freezes in October and stays under ice until June.

== See also ==
- List of lakes of Russia
