= Lake Krasnoye (Chukotka) =

Lake in Anadyrsky District, Chukotka Autonomous Okrug, Far Eastern Russia

- Красное озеро (Russian)
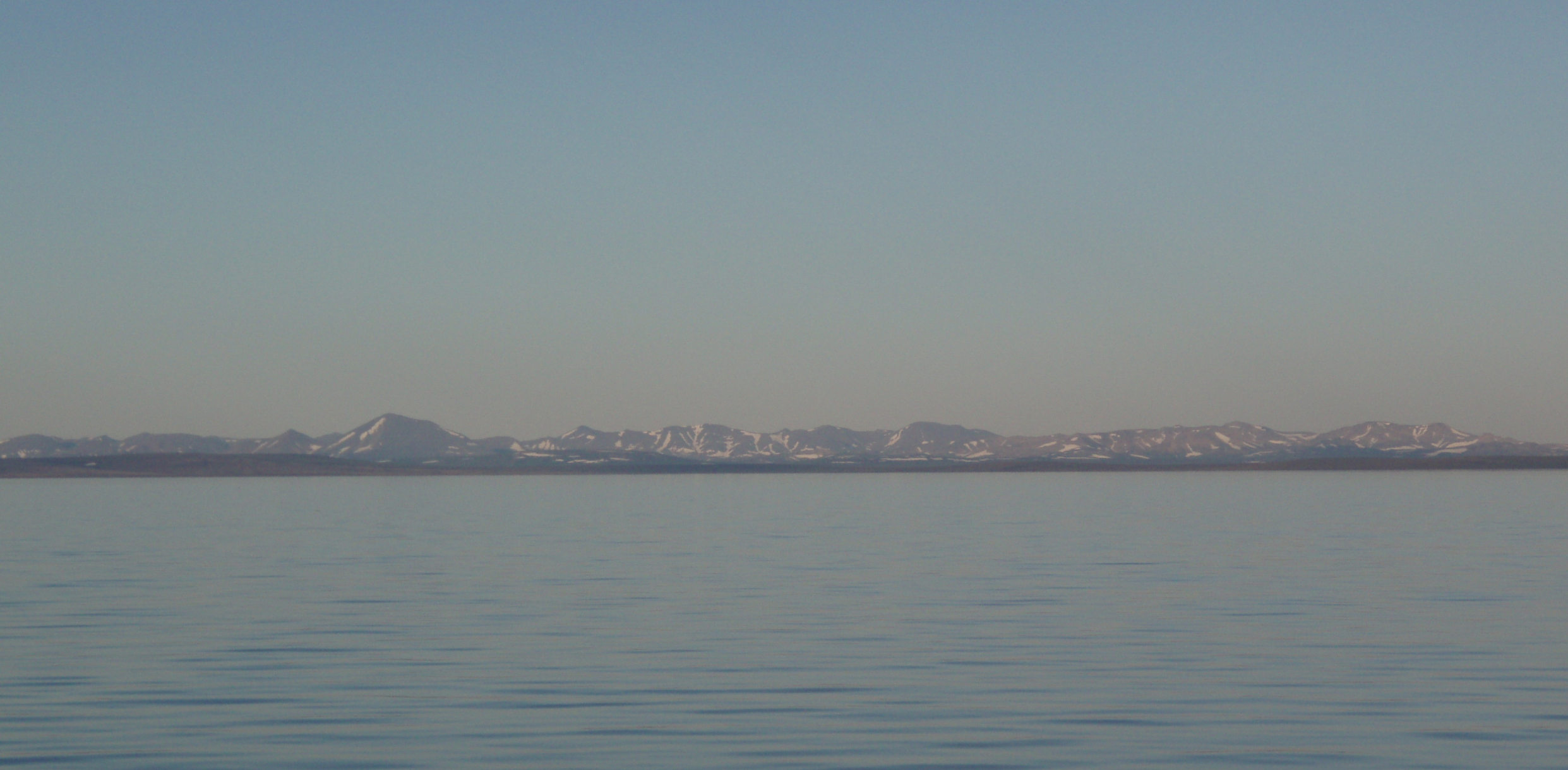
- View of Lake Krasnoye with the Rarytkin Range in the background

- Location in Chukotka Autonomous Okrug, Russia
- Location: Chukotka Autonomous Okrug, north-east Siberia
- Coordinates: 64°28′N 174°25′E
- Primary inflows: Березовая, Ламутская, Кэйвыльгильвеем, Таляйнын
- Primary outflows: Anadyr
- Basin countries: Russia
- Max. length: 35 km (22 mi)
- Max. width: 15 km (9.3 mi)
- Surface area: 458 km^{2} (177 sq mi)
- Average depth: 4 m (13 ft)

Lake Krasnoye (Russian: Красное озеро) is a lake in Anadyrsky District, Chukotka Autonomous Okrug, Far Eastern Russia.

It is located near the Anadyr Estuary and is the biggest lake in the Anadyr Lowlands. Historically, it was referred to on maps as Lake Krasnyano (Russian: озера Красняно).

== See also ==
- Yanragytgyn
- List of lakes of Russia
