= Main Channel =

Main Channel (54°10′S 36°42′W) is a small channel lying south of the Bar Rocks and leading to the head of Husvik Harbor in Stromness Bay, South Georgia. The name appears to be first used on a 1930 British Admiralty chart.
