= Tumanskaya =

- Location in the Chukotka Autonomous Okrug, Russia

Location
- Country: Russia

Physical characteristics
- Source
  - location: Koryak Mountains
  - elevation: 800 m (2,625 ft)
- Mouth: Bering Sea
  - location: Tymna lagoon, Gulf of Anadyr
  - coordinates: 64.0019°N 178.442°E
  - elevation: 0 m (0 ft)
- Length: 268 km (167 mi)
- Basin size: 9,270 km^{2} (3,580 sq mi)

The Tumanskaya (Russian: Туманская) is a river in Far East Russia. It flows through the Anadyr Lowlands, a region of wetlands and tundra, and into the Bering Sea at the Tymna lagoon. It is 268 kilometres (167 mi) long, and has a drainage basin of 9,270 square kilometres (3,580 sq mi).

The Tumanskaya and its tributaries belong to the Chukotka Autonomous Okrug administrative region of Russia.

The sockeye salmon is common in its waters. Belugas are common in the Tumanskaya Lagoon.

There is a small populated place in the area close to its mouth also called Tumanskaya.
