= Kakanaut Formation =

Late Cretaceous Siberian formation with dinosaur fossils and ancient plant orders

- Stratigraphic range: Maastrichtian; ~70–66 Ma
- Type: Geological formation
- Underlies: Danian marine deposits
- Overlies: Maastrichtian marine deposits
- Thickness: 1,000 m (3,300 ft)

Lithology
- Primary: Sandstone
- Other: Volcaniclastic

Location
- Coordinates: 62.9°N 177.1°E
- Approximate paleocoordinates: 75.7°N 179.0°E
- Region: Chukotka Autonomous Okrug
- Country: Russia

Type section
- Named for: Kakanaut River
- Kakanaut Formation (Russia)

The Kakanaut Formation is a geological formation in Siberia, whose strata date back to the Late Cretaceous (Maastrichtian). Dinosaur remains are among the fossils that have been recovered from the formation. The flora of the formation is relictual, containing some of the youngest remains of the extinct plant orders Bennettitales and Czekanowskiales.

== Fossil content ==
- Troodon cf. formosus
- Ankylosauria indet.
- Dinosauria indet.
- Dromaeosauridae indet.
- Hadrosauridae indet.
- Neoceratopsia indet.
- Ornithopoda indet.
- Prismatoolithidae indet.
- Spheroolithidae indet.
- Theropoda indet.
- Tyrannosauridae indet.
- ?Aves indet.

== See also ==
- List of dinosaur-bearing rock formations
- List of fossiliferous stratigraphic units in Russia
