= Velikaya (Chukotka) =

River in the country of Russia

Velikaya Meynyveem / Echinku
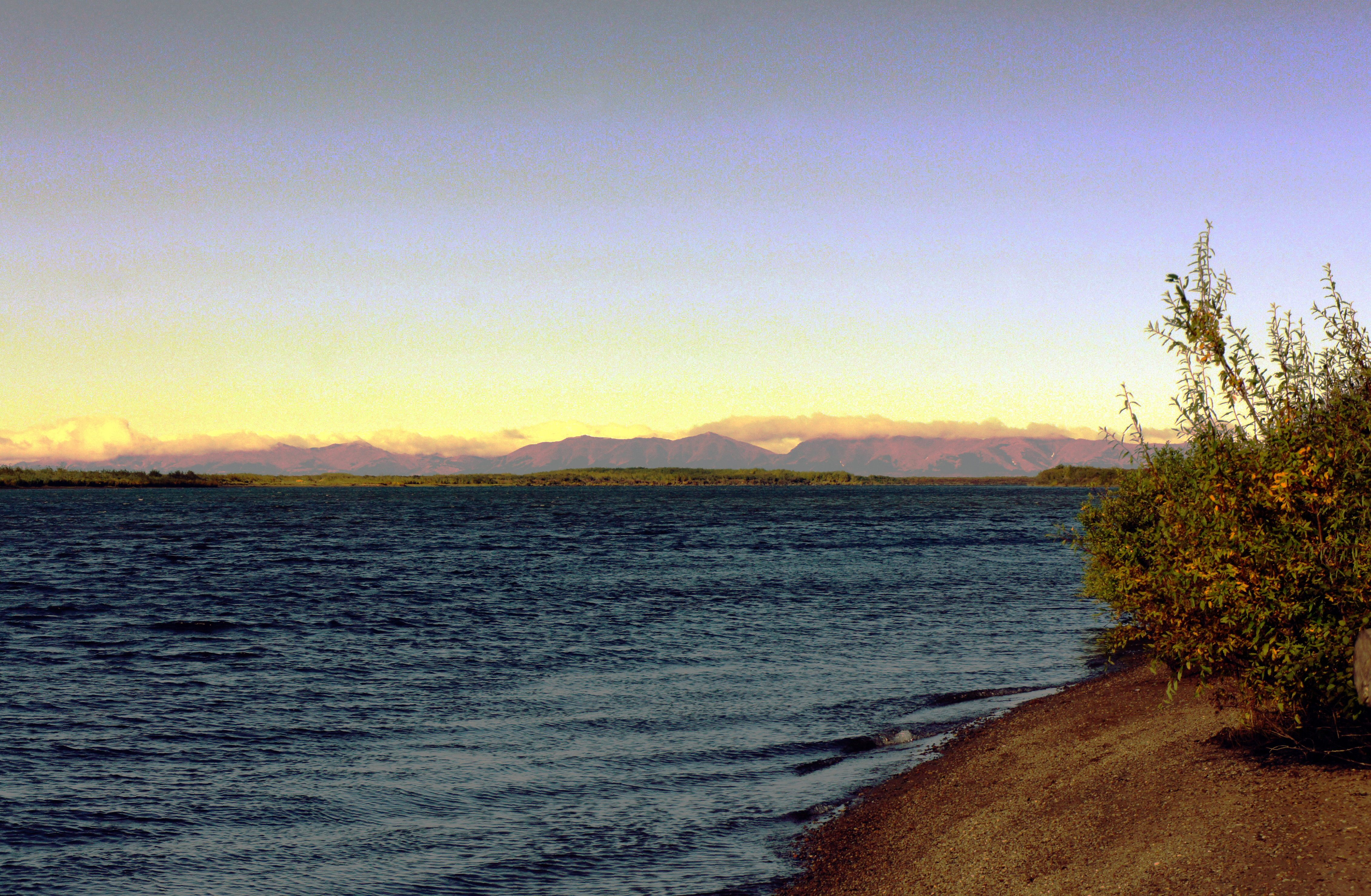

- Location in the Chukotka, Russia

Physical characteristics
- Source
  - location: Southern Mayn Range; Confluence of Kuimveyem and Kylvygeyvaam
  - elevation: 329 metres (1,079 ft)
- Mouth
  - location: Onemen Bay
  - coordinates: 64.5292°N 176.1235°E
  - elevation: 0 m (0 ft)
- Length: 451 km (280 mi)
- Basin size: 31,000 km^{2} (12,000 sq mi)
- Discharge
  - average: 409 m^{3}/s (14,400 cu ft/s)

The Velikaya (Russian: Великая, also Большая Bolshaya, Онемен Onemen; Chukot: Мэйнывээм, Meynyveem), is a river in Chukotka Autonomous Okrug in Russia. It is 451 kilometres (280 mi) long (556 km including its source river Kylvygeyvaam), and has a drainage basin of 31,000 square kilometres (12,000 sq mi).

The name of the river was given by the Russian inhabitants of the village of Markovo. Velikaya (Великая) means "great" in Russian and Bolshaya (Большая) translates to "big". The Velikaya and its tributaries belong to the Chukotka Autonomous Okrug. One of the native names of this river is Echinku and in some documents referring to this river in Soviet times, it was referred to as Velikaya-Echinku.

== Course ==
The Velikaya is formed in the eastern slopes of the Southern Mayn Range of the Koryak Mountains at the confluence of rivers Kuimveyem and Kylvygeyvaam. It heads northeastwards through mountainous terrain, descending into the southern end of the Anadyr Lowlands into Onemen Bay, part of the Anadyr River estuary of the Bering Sea at the Gulf of Anadyr. The Rarytkin Range rises along the left bank of the river in its middle and lower course. Lake Yanragytgyn is part of the Velikaya basin.

There is a small populated place in the area close to its estuary also named Velikaya. The Tamvathey (Тамватней) mercury mining town was located in the basin of the river, just south of its middle course. It was abandoned in 1984.

== Fauna ==
Beluga whales are common in its estuarine waters.

== See also ==
- List of rivers of Russia
