= Beringovsky (inhabited locality) =

Beringovsky Беринговский Гачгатагын (Chukchi)
- Urban-type settlement
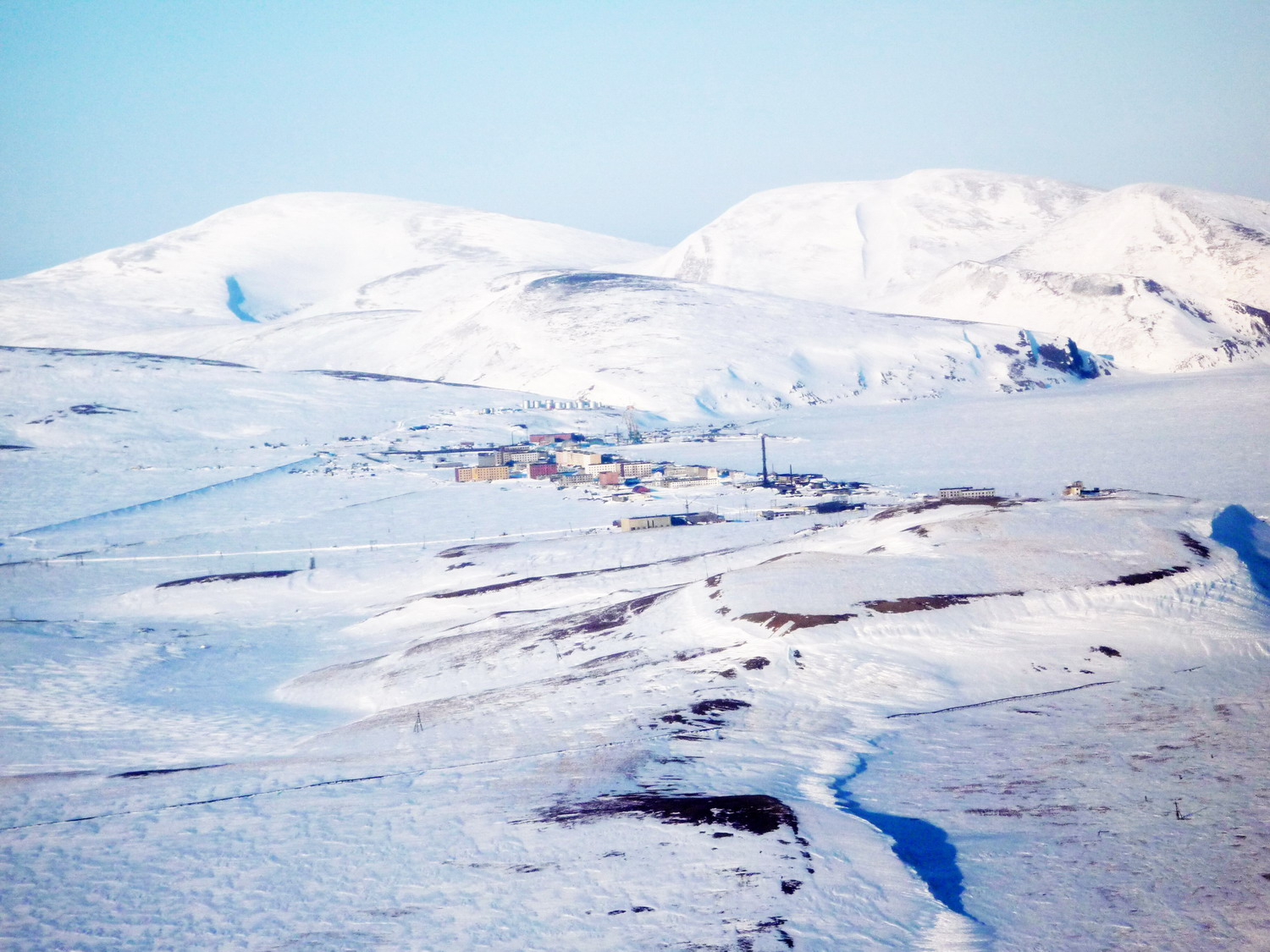
- Aerial winter view of Beringovsky
- Interactive map of Beringovsky
- Location of Beringovsky Beringovsky (Chukotka Autonomous Okrug)
- Coordinates: 63°02′59″N 179°18′36″E
- Country: Russia
- Federal subject: Chukotka Autonomous Okrug
- Administrative district: Anadyrsky District
- Founded: 1957
- Elevation: 1 m (3.3 ft)

Population (2010 Census)
  - Total: 1,401
  - Estimate (January 2018): 759 (−45.8%)

Municipal status
  - Municipal district: Anadyrsky Municipal District
  - Urban settlement: Beringovsky Urban Settlement
  - Capital of: Beringovsky Urban Settlement
- Time zone: UTC+12 (MSK+9)
- Postal code: 689100
- OKTMO ID: 77603159051

Beringovsky (Russian: Бе́ринговский; Chukchi: Гачгатагын, Gačgatagyn) is an urban locality (an urban-type settlement) in Anadyrsky District of Chukotka Autonomous Okrug, Russia, and a port on the Bering Sea. As of the 2010 Census, its population was 1,401.

== History ==
In 1826, Ugolnaya Bay (lit. coal bay), upon which Beringovsky stands, was first entered by the Russian sloop Senyavin commanded by Fyodor Litke on a mission to map and explore the coast of the Bering Sea. In 1886, an expedition led by Captain A. A. Ostolopov on the clipper Strelok discovered thick layers of coal here. This coal was later used to power the visiting vessels and is the reason why the bay is so named. Geological studies for industrial development of this field began in 1933–1934 by the All-Union Arctic Institute, followed by and exploratory expedition by the Chief Directorate of the Northern Sea Route (Glavsevmorput). Following the discovery of coal, the first settlement was established here to serve the new Bukhtugol mine. In April 1957, Beringovsky District was created within Chukotka National Okrug with the administrative center in the settlement of Ugolny. Due to the establishment of Beringovsky District, Ugolny was renamed Beringovsky in 1966. In 1975, the settlement was moved to a place called Nagorny, which was then renamed Beringovsky to provide continuity for the administrative center. In the late 1990s, Beringovsky had a population of around 3,000 when all heating, water and electricity failed, creating an extremely serious situation in such a remote location. This problem was then further exacerbated by then-Governor Nazarov banning all outside reporters and researchers, both from Moscow and abroad from visiting the area as well as censoring outgoing mail and telegrams from the community. Following this incident, sources report that by 2002, under a program of resettlement designed by Roman Abramovich and run by Regionstroy—a private company established by the Okrug administration—nearly the whole of the population of Beringovsky had been resettled by late 2002. However, this does not seem to tally with the official census results for 2002. Thompson estimates the population of Beringovsky in the late 1990s as being around 3,000; however, 2002 Census results give a population of just under 2,000. Further confusion is added as Thompson specifically refers to Beringovsky as being "in the process of official liquidation". However, to date Beringovsky has neither been liquidated nor is it in the process of liquidation and is included in all the relevant legal documentation as an extant settlement on both municipal and administrative levels.

== Administrative and municipal status ==
Within the framework of administrative divisions, Beringovsky is directly subordinated to Anadyrsky District. As a municipal division, the urban-type settlement of Beringovsky is incorporated within Anadyrsky Municipal District as Beringovsky Urban Settlement.

== Economy ==
The economy of the settlement has traditionally been dominated by coal mining and the majority of the current residents are involved either in the mining itself or the administrative side of the mining business. The indigenous proportion of the population is comparatively low compared to other settlements in the autonomous okrug, numbering around 350 as of 2006.

=== Transportation ===
Beringovsky is served by Beringovsky Airport.

There is a sea port at Beringovsky, mainly used for the coal mined.

Beringovsky is not connected to any other inhabited locality by permanent roads.

== Demographics ==
Demographic Evolution
1959 Census	1970 Census	1979 Census	1989 Census	2002 Census	2010 Census	2014 est.	2015 est.	2016 est.	2017 est.	2018 est.
2,788	2,173	2,952	3,044	1,998	1,401	1,003	983	837	755	759

== Culture ==
Like Uelen to the northeast, Beringovsky is well known as being a center for indigenous art, particularly whale bone carving.

The Bering dialect of the Aleut language is not directly connected with this settlement, though both the dialect's and the settlement's name are derived from Vitus Bering.

== Climate ==
Beringovsky has a tundra climate (Köppen ET) with very cold, long winters and short, cool and damp summers.

Climate data for Beringovsky (1959–2012)
Month	Jan	Feb	Mar	Apr	May	Jun	Jul	Aug	Sep	Oct	Nov	Dec	Year
Record high °C (°F)	0.4 (32.7)	1.9 (35.4)	5.3 (41.5)	4.6 (40.3)	10.7 (51.3)	22.8 (73.0)	27.4 (81.3)	27.5 (81.5)	17.2 (63.0)	9.4 (48.9)	5.4 (41.7)	10.3 (50.5)	27.5 (81.5)
Mean daily maximum °C (°F)	−13.0 (8.6)	−14.6 (5.7)	−13.3 (8.1)	−7.4 (18.7)	0.9 (33.6)	9.0 (48.2)	13.5 (56.3)	12.3 (54.1)	7.1 (44.8)	−0.6 (30.9)	−6.8 (19.8)	−11.1 (12.0)	−2.0 (28.4)
Daily mean °C (°F)	−16.0 (3.2)	−17.5 (0.5)	−16.2 (2.8)	−10.5 (13.1)	−1.6 (29.1)	5.3 (41.5)	9.4 (48.9)	9.0 (48.2)	4.6 (40.3)	−3.1 (26.4)	−9.6 (14.7)	−14.1 (6.6)	−5.0 (23.0)
Mean daily minimum °C (°F)	−18.9 (−2.0)	−20.4 (−4.7)	−18.9 (−2.0)	−13.3 (8.1)	−3.6 (25.5)	2.5 (36.5)	6.6 (43.9)	6.7 (44.1)	2.4 (36.3)	−5.4 (22.3)	−12.5 (9.5)	−17.2 (1.0)	−7.7 (18.1)
Record low °C (°F)	−36.6 (−33.9)	−43.5 (−46.3)	−36.5 (−33.7)	−31.5 (−24.7)	−22.1 (−7.8)	−5.1 (22.8)	0.0 (32.0)	−1.7 (28.9)	−9.0 (15.8)	−20.5 (−4.9)	−29.0 (−20.2)	−35.2 (−31.4)	−43.5 (−46.3)
Average precipitation mm (inches)	47.3 (1.86)	32.8 (1.29)	27.1 (1.07)	25.2 (0.99)	25.4 (1.00)	25.0 (0.98)	41.6 (1.64)	69.2 (2.72)	55.2 (2.17)	54.1 (2.13)	62.8 (2.47)	62.8 (2.47)	528.5 (20.79)
Source: climatebase.ru

== See also ==
- List of inhabited localities in Anadyrsky District
