= Anyuy =

Anyuy may refer to:

- Anyuy Mountains in far northeastern Russia
- Anyuy Volcano
- Anyuy (Kolyma), a right tributary of the Kolyma in the Sakha (Yakutia) Republic, Russia
  - Maly Anyuy, a tributary of the Anyuy
  - Bolshoy Anyuy, a tributary of the Anyuy
- Anyuy (Amur), a tributary of the Amur in Khabarovsk Krai, Russia
