= Gerhard von Maydell =

Estonian explorer, cartographer and ethnologist (1835–1894)

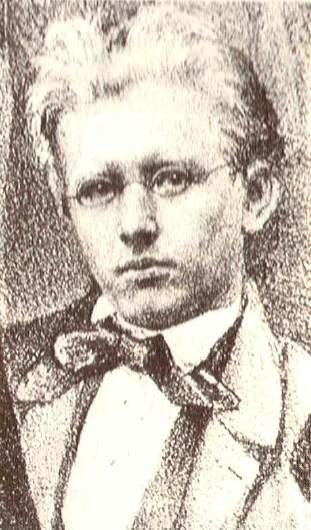
- Born: 1 May 1835; Tartu, Estonia
- Died: 17 August 1894 (aged 59); Koblenz, German Empire

Gerhard Gustav Ludwig von Maydell, Baron von Maydell, (Russian: Гергард Людвигович Майдель; 1 May 1835 in Tartu – 17 August 1894 in Koblenz, Germany) was a Russian explorer, cartographer and ethnologist of Estonian descent. He is known for his pioneering research in the Russian Far East.

== Biography ==
Gerhard was born in Estonia in a family of artists, as a descendant of the Baltic-German noble family Maydell. He went to school in Tallinn and between 1854 and 1858 he studied at the University of Tartu, graduating in 1859. Gerhard Maydell traveled to Siberia in 1859 to take part in the expedition of the Imperial Russian Geographical Society to the Amur Territory and Sakhalin Island as an assistant to Fyodor Schmidt, but he fell ill and stayed in Irkutsk. In 1860 he was appointed as an officer at the service of the Irkutsk Governor. He was named district police chief, serving in the Olyokma and Vilyuy districts of the Kolyma region from 1862 to 1870.

=== 1868–1870 East Siberia expedition ===
In 1868 Maydell was commissioned by the Governor-General of Eastern Siberia to undertake an expedition to unexplored areas of Yakutia on behalf of the Russian Academy of Sciences. The expedition consisted of a small party that included ethnographer Karl Karlovich Neyman and topographer P. Afonasiev. After crossing the Tas-Khayakhtakh range in the northern part of the vast Chersky mountain system, he discovered the uninhabited Yana Plateau, located between the Yana River to the west and the main Chersky Range to the east. Continuing along the Selennyakh River, a left tributary of the Indigirka, the group went with reindeers across the Aby Lowland and the Alazeya Plateau and reached Srednekolymsk. From there, the party went down the frozen Kolyma on dog sleds and in the spring of 1869 it reached the mouth of its right tributary, the Little Anyuy river. Heading southeastwards, the entire course of the Bolshoy Anyuy river was explored, reaching its source in the Anadyr Highlands and continuing in the direction of the Gulf of Anadyr, which was reached in the fall. From there the detachment headed straight west, reaching the village of Markovo.

At Markovo the group split in two, with Neyman and Afonasiev heading northwest to the mouth of the Kolyma to explore the Bear Islands. Afonasiev went then southwest without local guides to a formerly unexplored mountain area, crossing the upper reaches of the Bolshoy Anyuy and Oloy rivers and reaching the Anyuy Mountains, as well as the Oloy Range and the Ush-Urekchen. He was also the first to map a 550 km (340 mi) section of the Omolon River. Meanwhile Maydell, heading southwest from Markovo, crossed the Penzhina River and reached the Gizhiga river in December 1869, being the first to discover, cross and map two ranges of the Koryak Highlands separated by the Oklan, a tributary of the Penzhina, the Ichigem Range to the north and the Oklan Plateau to the south. At the beginning of 1870 he returned by the same route to Markovo. In March, following a month-long rest, Maydell headed northwest to the sources of the Yablon River, a right tributary of the Anadyr. He crossed the Anyuy Range, reached the Maly Anyuy River and descended to Nizhnekolymsk to meet again with the other expedition members.

In the summer of 1870 the group split again. Neyman and Afonasiev went up the Kolyma to the village of Zyryanka and through the upper reaches of the Omulyovka and the Nera they reached Oymyakon after crossing the Moma and the Chersky ranges. Meanwhile Maydell crossed the Kolyma Lowland. He charted the Suor-Uyata and Ulakhan-Sis ranges of the lowlands, reaching the Indigirka. Going 100 km (62 mi) upriver he found out that the Ulakhan-Sis was separated from the Alazeya Plateau by the roughly 50 km (31 mi) wide plain of the Shangina river, a right tributary of the Indigirka. Heading west across the river, Maydell reached Lake Ozhogino and mapped the still unexplored Polousny Range.

Owing to the often difficult terrain, with swamps and often impassable rivers, Maydell considered that the expedition had been overall unsuccessful. The results of the expedition were later assessed by leading academician of the Imperial Academy of Sciences Karl Ernst von Baer. In the following decades Maydell's work was subject to further scrutiny and, despite the critical attitude of later researchers, Soviet geologist Sergei Obruchev of the USSR Academy of Sciences took a positive view. Although Maydell's work about the orography of Far Northeast Asia contains inaccuracies, it helped to slowly build up the knowledge about the vast region.

== Works ==
Maydell took numerous notes on the languages of the Evenki, Yukaghir and the Evens of the Anadyr area. His dictionaries and linguistic samples resulting from his work among the Far East Siberian people were studied and processed by Anton Antonovich Schifner of the Imperial Academy of Sciences.

- Aus Transhbaikalien. - Baltische Monatsschrift, 4-5, 1884.
- Reisen und Forschungen in Jakutskischen Gebiet Ostsibiriens in den Jahren 1861-1871. I-II St. Petersburg, 1893-1896.
- Ответы Чукотской Экспедиции на вопросы академика Бэра. - Известия Сибирского отделения Русского географического общества. 1-2 1871.

== Honors ==
Bukhta Maydell (бухта майдель), a bay near Vladivostok, is named in his honor.

== See also ==
- Yana Plateau
