= Russian Guards =

Elite Russian military units

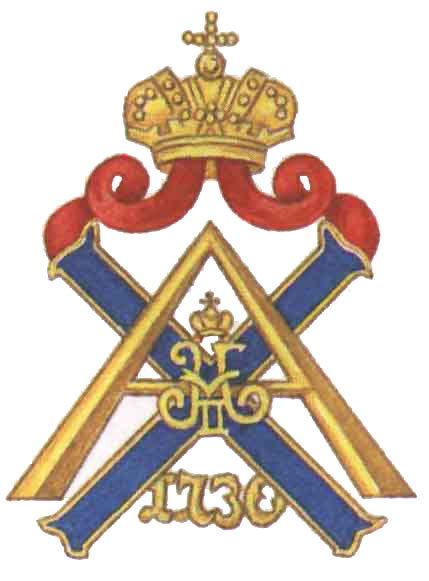
Badge of the Russian Imperial Guard Izmaylovsky Regiment.

Guards (Russian: гвардия) or Guards units (Russian: гвардейские части, gvardeyskiye chasti) were elite military units of Imperial Russia prior to 1917–18. The designation of Guards was subsequently adopted as a distinction for various units and formations of the Soviet Union and the modern Russian Federation. The tradition goes back to a chieftain's druzhina of medieval Kievan Rus' and the streletskoye voysko (Стрелецкое Войско), the Muscovite harquebusiers formed by Ivan the Terrible by 1550. The exact meaning of the term "Guards" varied over time.

== Russian Imperial Guard ==
In the Russian Empire, Russian Imperial Guard units (also lifguard or life-guard, лейб-гвардия, leyb-gvardiya), derived from German Leibgarde (en: lifeguard or life-guard), were intended to ensure the security of the sovereign, initially, that of Peter the Great in the 1690s. These were based on the Prussian Royal Life Guards. During the 19th-century, some Imperial Russian Guard regiments were called by names of regions outside modern Russia, such as Lithuanian, Finnish and Volhynian Life Guards Regiments.

At the beginning of the 20th century, the Imperial Guards consisted of 13 infantry, 4 rifles and 14 cavalry regiments, artillery, engineers and transport, making up a separate entity within the army of three divisions. During the Brusilov Offensive the 1st and 2nd Guards' numbers were supplemented with line army corps and from September 1916 were known as the 'Special Army'.

In February–March 1917, the defection of reserve battalions of the Imperial Guard based in St.Petersburg was a major factor in the overthrow of the Tsarist government. The service units of the Guard at the front disintegrated along with the remainder of the Imperial Army, until it was formally replaced by the new Red Army on 28 January 1918.

== Russian Revolution ==
The Red Guards (Russian: Krasnaya Gvardiya) were armed groups of workers formed during the Russian Revolution of 1917, although the designation and concept dates back to Moscow during the Revolution of 1905. In 1917 the volunteers of the Red Guard and their elected leaders formed the main strike force of the Bolsheviks. These workers' militias were created in March 1917 in by Factory and Plant Committees and by Bolshevik party cells, with the initial purpose of defending the industrial enterprises and districts where they were recruited. In October 1917 the Red Guards of Petrograd played a leading role in the capture of the Winter Palace and the overthrow of the Provisional Government. When the Soviet Red Army was formed in 1918, the Red Guards became the Army Reserve and the basis for the formation of regular military detachments.

The White Guard (Russian: Belaya Gvardiya) of the White Army (Belaya Armiya, whose members were called belogvardeytsy), the military forces of the Russian White Movement, which opposed the Bolsheviks after the October Revolution and fought against the Red Army during the Russian Civil War from 1918 to 1921.

== Soviet Guards ==
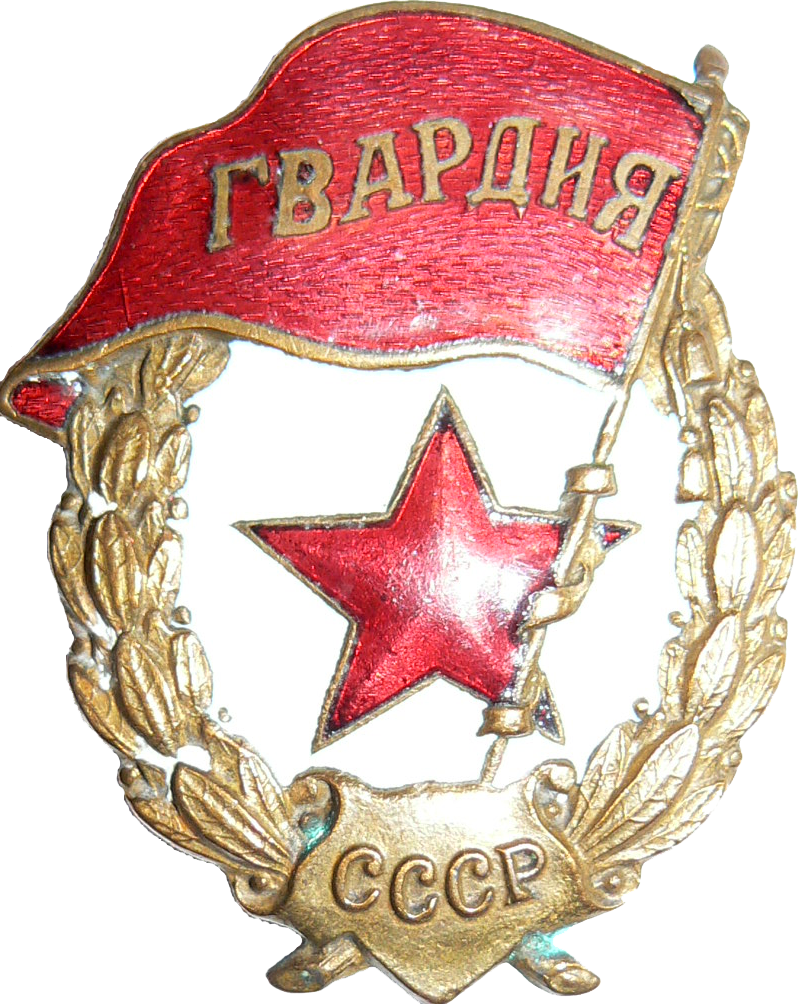
Badge of the Soviet Guards (1941).

"Guards" (Russian: Гвардия, romanized: Gvardiya) designations were awarded to units and formations that distinguished themselves during the Second World War by the order of People's Commissar for Defence of USSR No.303 on the 18 September 1941, and were considered to have elite status. However, the Guards badge was not introduced until 21 May 1943.

In late 1941, the Stavka began awarding the honorific title 'Guards' to regiments, divisions, and corps that had distinguished themselves in combat. Units earning this title had often suffered up to 30 percent or more casualties after successfully performing desperate missions. It was not only a prestigious designation, as units so honoured were thereafter better equipped and given preference in personnel, supplies, equipment and material.

Zhukov said "the first period of the war gave birth to the Soviet Guards. For mass heroism and success in the battles of 1941-1942 the Guards title was awarded to 789 groups, formations, separate units, and fighting ships of the Soviet Armed Forces."

Pik Sovetskoy Gvardii, meaning "Soviet Guard Peak", the second highest mountain in the Anyuy Range, was named after the Soviet Guards.

There were eleven Guard Armies and six Guard Tank Armies:

- 1st Guards Army
- 2nd Guards Army
- 3rd Guards Army
- 4th Guards Army
- 5th Guards Army
- 6th Guards Army
- 7th Guards Army
- 8th Guards Army
- 9th Guards Army
- 10th Guards Army
- 11th Guards Army
- 1st Guards Tank Army
- 2nd Guards Tank Army
- 3rd Guards Tank Army
- 4th Guards Tank Army
- 5th Guards Tank Army
- 6th Guards Tank Army

== Russian Federation Guards ==
The Guards distinction was retained as designations of units and formations in the armed forces of the former Soviet Union: Russia, Belarus, and Ukraine.

The National Guard of Russia was formed in 2016.

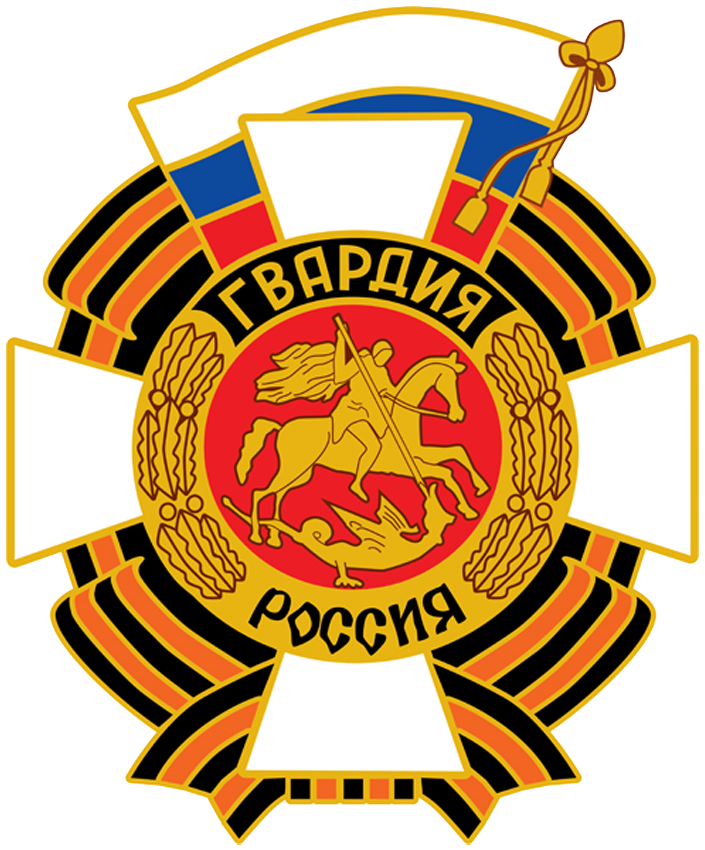
Badge of Russian Guards units (1994)

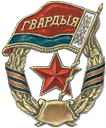
Badge of Belarusian Guards units

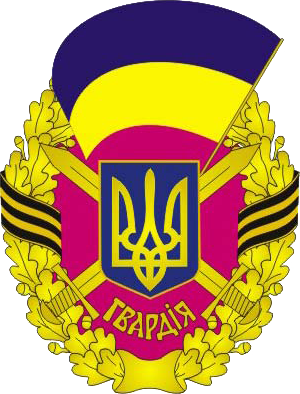
Badge of Ukrainian Guards units (removed 2016)

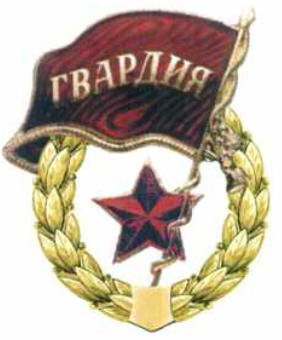
Russian Guards badge (2011–2024)

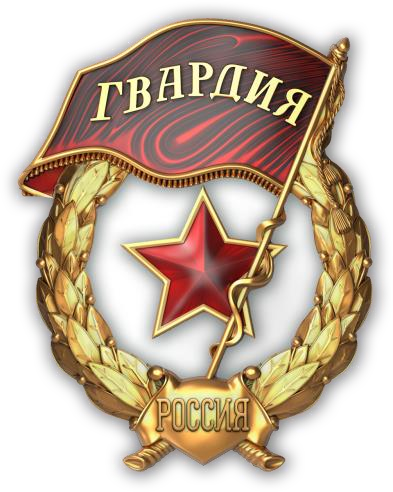
Russian Guards badge (2024-present)

== See also ==
- List of guards units of Ukraine
