= Anadyr Highlands =

Mountain range in Russia

- анадырское нагорье
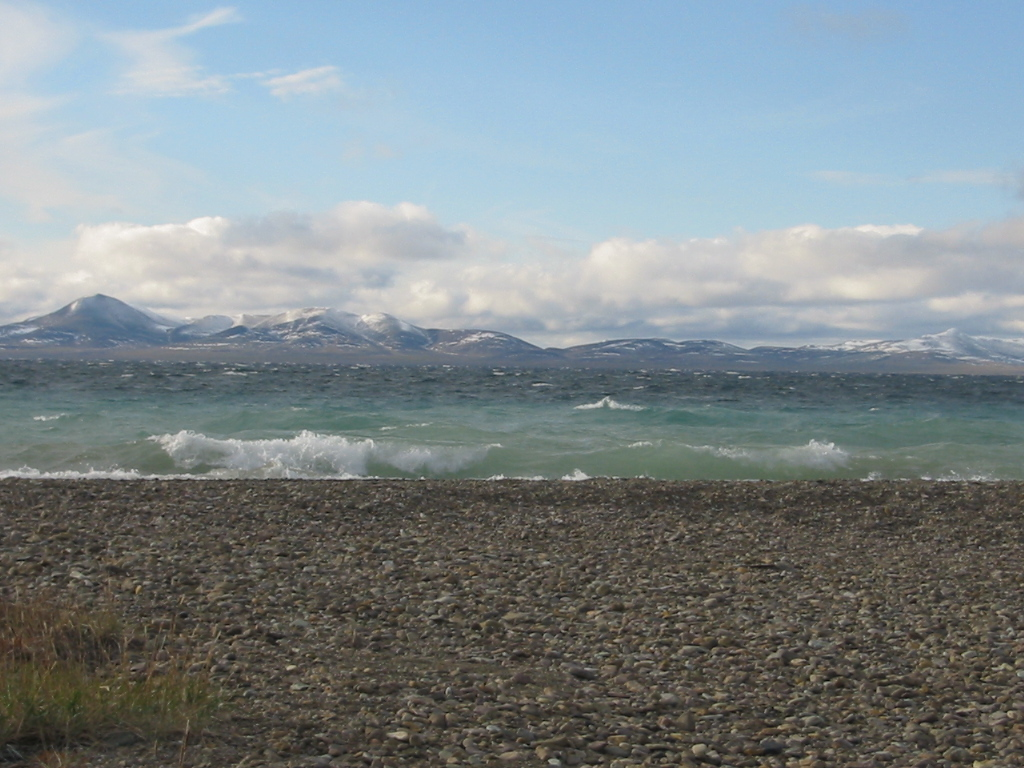
- Storm over Lake Elgygytgyn

Dimensions
- Length: 600 km (370 mi)
- Width: 300 km (190 mi)

Geography
- Location within Chukotka Autonomous Okrug
- Country: Russia
- Federal subject: Chukotka Autonomous Okrug
- Range coordinates: 67°0′N 170°0′E
- Parent range: East Siberian System

Geology
- Rock ages: Late Paleocene and Eocene
- Rock types: Basalt, andesite, dacite and Volcanic rocks

The Anadyr Highlands (Russian: Анадырское нагорье, romanized: Anadyrskoye Nagorye) are a mountainous area in the Chukotka Autonomous Okrug, Far Eastern Federal District, Russia.

== Geography ==
The Anadyr Highlands are one of the two main mountain regions of Chukotka Autonomous Okrug. They rise southwest of the Chukotka Mountains, in the western Chukotka region. Medium height mountain ranges stretch in roughly WNW/ESE direction west of a large plateau and in a SW/NE direction in the south. The highlands rise between the Chaun Lowlands in the north, the Anadyr Lowlands in the southeast, the Kolyma Mountains in the southwest and the Kolyma Lowlands, where the Kolyma River flows, in the west.

Among the rivers that have their source in the mountains, the main ones are the Anadyr River flowing off the highland limits to the southeast as the Belaya, the Bolshoy Anyuy and the Maly Anyuy —flowing westwards on both sides of the Anyuy Range. The Enmyvaam flows southwards out of Lake Elgygytgyn, later joining the Belaya, while the Chaun River flows northwards from the northwestern edge of the crater of the lake.

=== Anadyr Plateau ===
The main feature of the highlands is the Anadyr Plateau, which forms most of the eastern part.

The Anadyr Plateau is roughly 400 kilometers (250 mi) long and about 150 kilometers (93 mi) wide. It is located in the latitude of the Arctic Circle and limited by the Pekulney Range to the east. The average height of the plateau surface is between 700 meters (2,300 ft) and 800 meters (2,600 ft). Lake Elgygytgyn, an impact crater lake is located in a roughly central position. The plateau is largely covered with tundra and shrubs.

=== Subranges ===
Besides the Anadyr Plateau, the system of the Anadyr Highlands comprises a number of subranges, including the following:

- Tainykot Range, highest point 1,189 metres (3,901 ft) —the northwesternmost
- Rauchuan Range, highest point Mount Belaya, 1,649 metres (5,410 ft)
- Ilirney Range, highest point Dvukh Tsirkov (Двух Цирков) 1,785 metres (5,856 ft)
- Anyuy Range, highest point Blokhin Peak, 1,779 metres (5,837 ft)
- Neuten Range, highest point 1,551 metres (5,089 ft)
- Chuvanay Range, highest point Mount Chuvanay (гора Чуванаи), 1,614 metres (5,295 ft)
- Kyrganay Range, highest point 1,415 metres (4,642 ft)
- Pyrkanay Range, highest point 1,616 metres (5,302 ft)
- Shchuchy Range, highest point 1,185 metres (3,888 ft)
- Osinov Range, highest point 1,225 metres (4,019 ft)

== See also ==
- List of mountains and hills of Russia
