= Orlovka (Bolshoy Anyuy) =

Location
- Country: Russia

Physical characteristics
- Mouth: Bolshoy Anyuy
  - coordinates: 66.7772°N 164.7673°E
- Length: 127 km (79 mi)
- Basin size: 2,450 km^{2} (950 sq mi)

Basin features
- Progression: Bolshoy Anyuy→ Anyuy→ Kolyma→ East Siberian Sea

The Orlovka is a river of Bilibinsky District, Chukotka Autonomous Okrug, Russia. It is a right tributary of the Bolshoy Anyuy. It is 127 kilometres (79 mi) long, and has a drainage basin of 2,450 square kilometres (950 sq mi).
