= Shchuchy Range =

Mountain range in Russia

- Щучий хребет
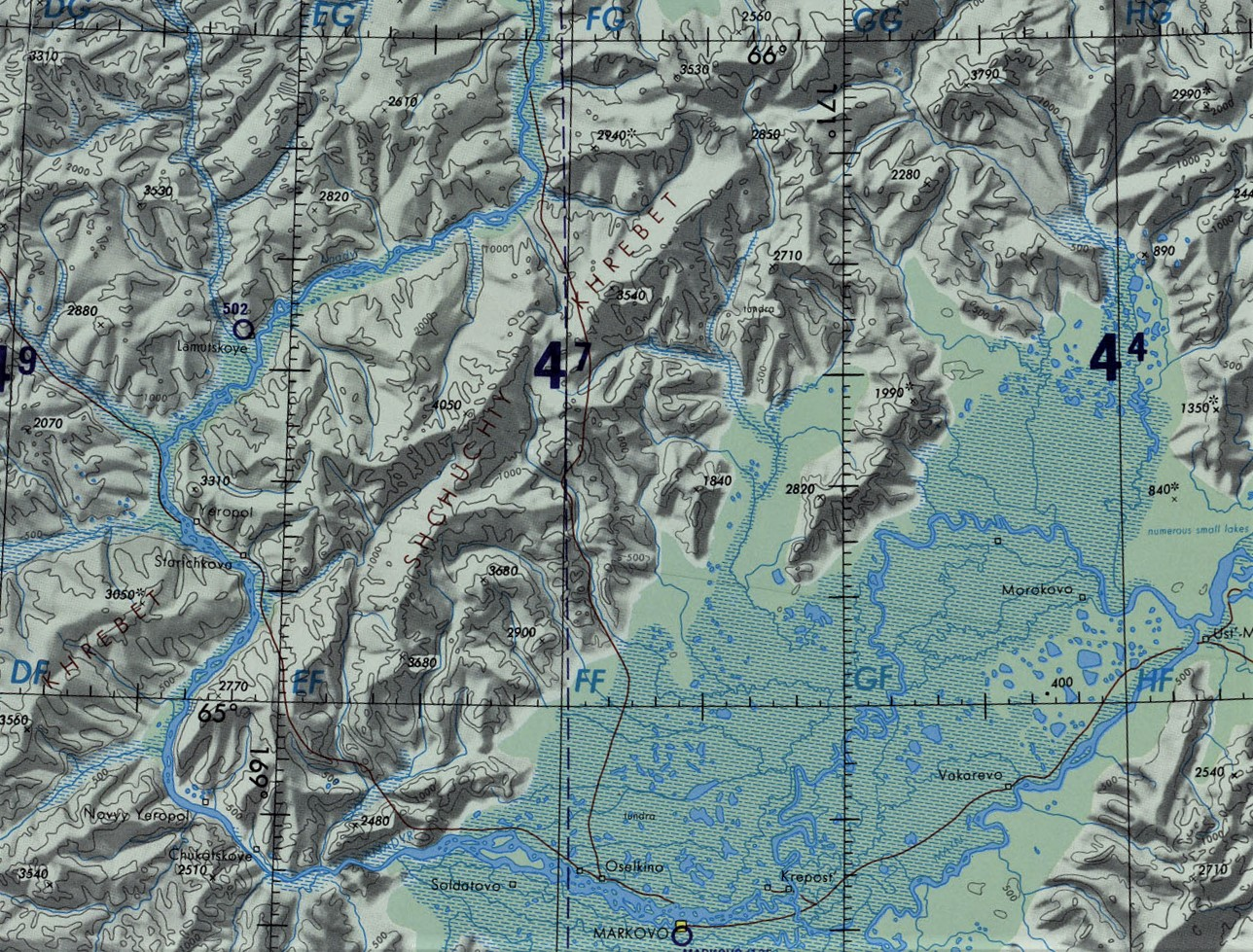
- Shchuchy Range map section

Highest point
- Peak: Mount Shchuchya
- Elevation: 1,185 m (3,888 ft)
- Listing: Mountains and hills of Russia
- Coordinates: 65°37′25″N 170°08′40″E

Dimensions
- Length: 120 km (75 mi) NNE/SSW
- Width: 40 km (25 mi) WNW/ESE

Geography
- Location within Chukotka Autonomous Okrug
- Location: Chukotka Autonomous Okrug, Russian Far East
- Range coordinates: 65°35′N 170°0′E
- Parent range: Anadyr Highlands; East Siberian System
- Borders on: Anyuy Mountains and Oloy Range

Geology
- Orogeny: Alpine orogeny

Climbing
- Easiest route: from Markovo

The Shchuchy Range (Russian: Щучий хребет), is a range of mountains in Chukotka Autonomous Okrug, Russian Far East. Administratively the range is part of the Anadyr District.

The village of Markovo is located about 30 kilometres (19 mi) to the SSE of the range near the eastern side of its southern end.

== Geography ==
The Shchuchy Range extends for roughly 120 kilometres (75 mi) in a NNE/SSW direction from the southeastern end of the Anadyr Plateau. To the west the mountain range is limited by the course of the Anadyr River, which flows first southwards, then makes a wide bend at the southern end of the range, and then flows roughly northeastwards in a wide valley. Numerous tributaries of the Anadyr have their source on both sides of the range.

The highest point of the Shchuchy Range is 1,185 metres (3,888 ft) high Gora Shchuchya (гора щучья). To the northwest of the range rises the Anyuy Range, stretching in a roughly western direction, and to the west of the SW end of the range rises the Oloy Range of the Kolyma Mountains. The Shchuchy Range is part of the East Siberian System of mountains and is one of the subranges of the Anadyr Highlands.

== See also ==
- List of mountains and hills of Russia
