= Belaya (Chukotka) =

Belaya Белая
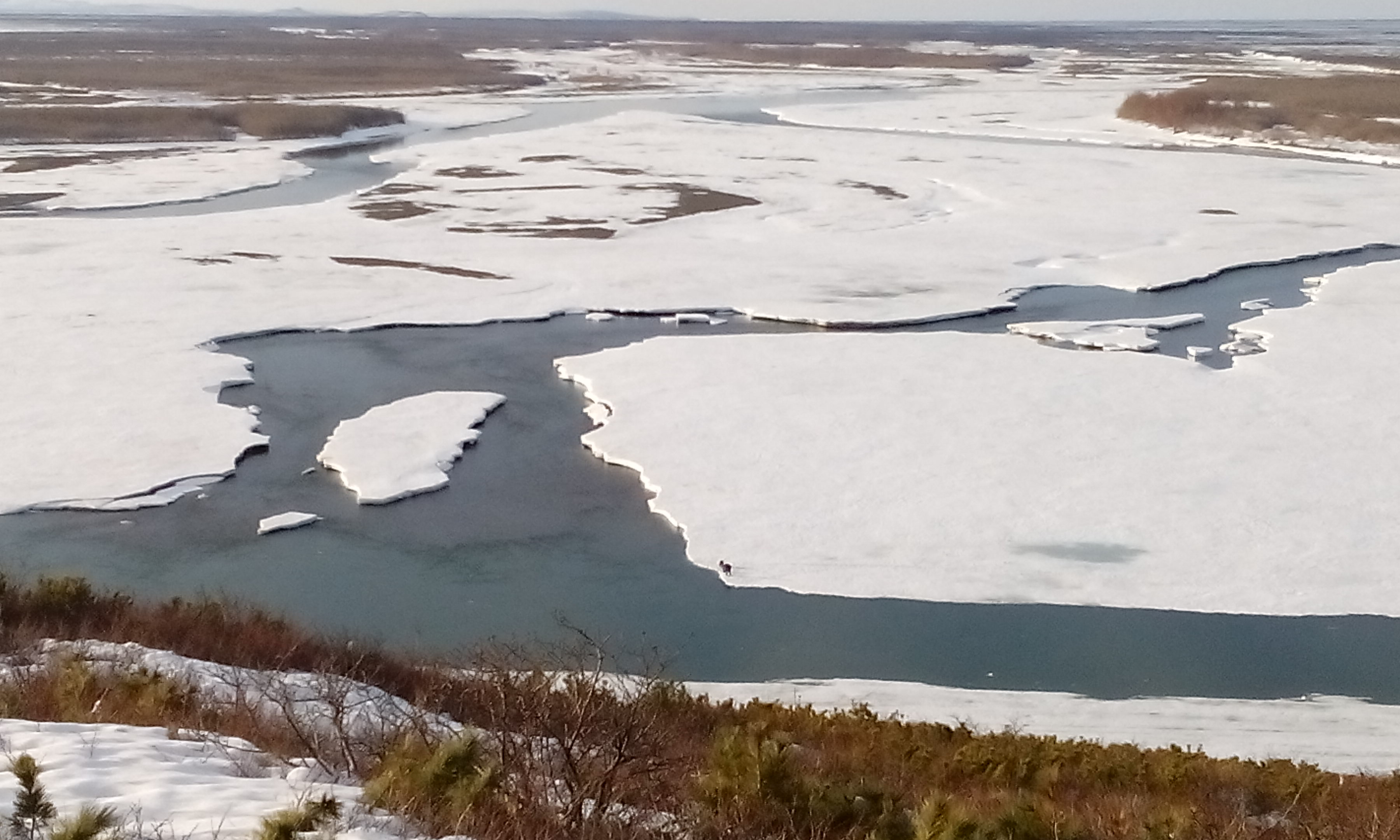
- Confluence of the Belaya and the Anadyr

- Location in the Chukotka Autonomous Okrug, Russia

Location
- Country: Russia
- Federal subject: Chukotka Autonomous Okrug

Physical characteristics
- Source
  - location: North of Lake Elgygytgyn
  - coordinates: 67.6539°N 172.0972°E
- Mouth: Anadyr
  - coordinates: 65.5083°N 173.2726°E
  - elevation: 20 m (66 ft)
- Length: 396 km (246 mi)
- Basin size: 44,700 km^{2} (17,300 sq mi)
- Discharge
  - average: 402 cubic metres per second (14,200 cu ft/s)

Basin features
- Progression: Anadyr→ Bering Sea

The Belaya (Russian: Белая), in its upper course Yurumkuveyem (Russian: Юрумкувеем; Chukot: Кувлючьывээм, romanized: Kuwljuc’ywēm), is a south-flowing tributary of the Anadyr in the Chukotka Autonomous Okrug administrative region of Russia.

== Course ==
The source of the Yurumkuveyem is in the northern Anadyr Mountains. Its main tributaries are the Bolshoy Pykarvaam, Chaavaam and Bolshaya Osinovaya from the left, and the Enmyvaam, which drains Lake Elgygytgyn, from the right. Its basin is 44,700 square kilometres (17,300 mi^{2}) and its length is 396 kilometres (246 mi) (487 km from its furthest source, that of the Bolshoy Pykarvaam). Downstream from its confluence with the Enmyvaam it is named Belaya.

The Belaya flows through sparsely populated areas of Chukotka, flows southwards across the eastern edge of the Anadyr Highlands and the Pekulney Range, and joins with the Enmyvaam in the Parapol-Belsky Lowlands, at the head of the Anadyr Lowlands. The Belaya meets the Anadyr more than 300 kilometres (190 mi) from its mouth in the mid-lower stretch of its course. Ust-Belaya village lies at the confluence of the Belaya and Anadyr. Below the confluence with the Belaya, the Anadyr separates into multiple smaller channels upriver from where the Tanyurer meets it. The Belaya and its tributaries are frozen for about eight to nine months in a year.

== Fauna ==
A type of whitefish, Coregonus cylindraceus, is common in the waters of the Belaya River.

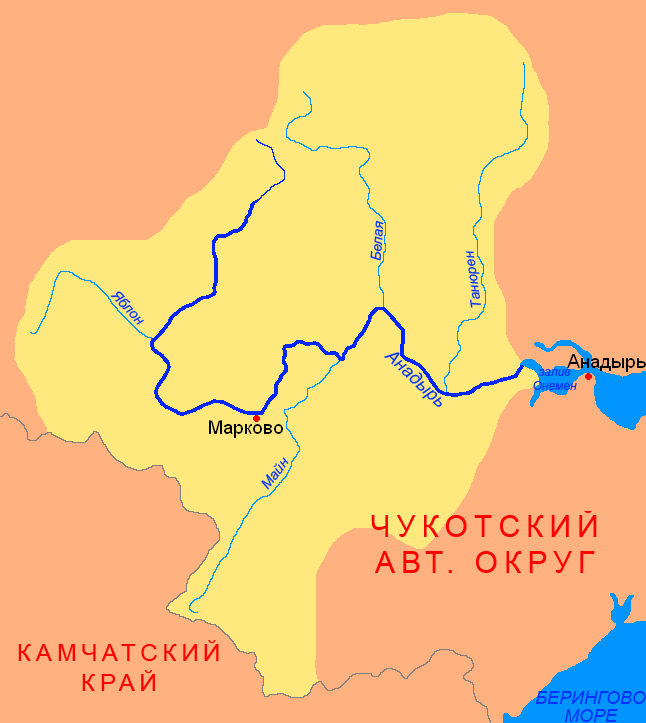
Anadyr basin.

== See also ==
- List of rivers of Russia
