= Aluchin Horst =

Mountains in Siberian Russia

Coordinates: 66°27′N 164°42′E

Location within Chukotka Autonomous Okrug, Russia

The Aluchin Horst (Aluchinskii Massif) is a mountainous geological formation in the Siberian Far East. It is located right below the Arctic Circle, close to the Baimka River, a left tributary of the Bolshoy Anyui River, about 180 km southwest of Bilibino.

This horst belongs to the Chukotka Autonomous Okrug administrative division of Russia.

There are very significant gold placers and platinum group minerals (PGM) in the Baimka basin, in the immediate vicinity of the Aluchin Horst.

== See also ==
- Aluchin (volcano)
