= Aluchin (volcano) =

Volcano in Chukotka Autonomous Okrug, Russia

- Location within Far Eastern Federal District

Highest point
- Elevation: 70 m (230 ft)
- Coordinates: 66°06′N 165°24′E

Geography
- Location: Russia
- Parent range: Anyuy Range

Aluchin is a volcano along the Aluchin River in the Chukotka Autonomous Okrug of Russia. The volcano was discovered in 1956–1957 by G.K. Kleshchev.

== Description ==
The volcano is formed by three cones, named Alpha, Beta and Gamma, which occur along a fissure. Alpha, the main cone, formed within a river valley. It is 70 metres (230 ft) high and has a diameter of 450 metres (1,480 ft). A crater 130 metres (430 ft) wide and 25–30 metres (82–98 ft) deep caps the cone. Beta, a smaller cone formed by lava and scoria, grew on the southeastern side of Alpha. It ejected lava bombs with sizes of up to 15 centimetres (5.9 in) that landed in the surrounding valleys. Beta is partially degraded, 40 metres (130 ft) high and has a 20 m (66 ft) wide crater. Gamma is formed by agglomerates. Because the poorly indurated agglomerates are subject to rapid erosion the cone's structure has been heavily degraded. It is 100 metres (330 ft) high with no recognizable crater and a base size of 200 by 400 metres (660 ft × 1,310 ft).

Volcanic activity has generated lava flows that fill a valley. These flows cover a surface area of 250 square kilometres (97 sq mi) and reach a length of 35 kilometres (22 mi). The total volume reached by the flows is 0.05 cubic kilometres (0.012 cu mi), or more. Part of the lava flowed down into the valley of the Aluchin River, reaching a length of 5 metres (16 ft) upvalley. These lava flows may be dependent on fissure eruptions along the fault rather than the cones. The eruption of the lava disrupted the river courses of the Aluchin and Burgakhchan rivers. Later the Aluchin River cut a deep gorge in the lava flow, exposing columnar basalts. The eruptions of the Beta and Gamma lava flows apparently occurred in three distinct events.

Volcanic rocks erupted by the Aluchin volcanic cones include basalts with glass-, pumice- and scoria-like consistency. Granodiorite blocks are found as xenoliths. The lava flows contain olivine, ilmenite and magnetite. The rocks of the volcano are of trachybasalt-basalt composition, being a typical continental Asia alkaline series. Their formation was influenced by pyroxene fractionation.

The volcano is located in part of the Anyuy area where a fault dating back possibly to the Paleozoic cuts the terrain. Paleozoic and possibly Proterozoic rocks crop out at the sides of the fault. A number of volcanic rocks, both effusive and intrusive ones, are associated with the fault and go as far back as the Devonian.

The lava flows of the Beta and Gamma cones apparently formed first. An age of 1000 CE was estimated for the volcanoes, on the basis of the timespan estimated for the development of soil on the lava flows and the growth of trees on them. This would make Aluchin one of the few continental Asian volcanoes with activity during the Holocene. Argon-argon dating however has yielded a much older age of 277,300 ± 2,100 years ago; that age may reflect a more general volcanic event in northeastern Russia, as other local volcanoes were also active at that time. The formation of the Alpha cone was characterized by an alternation of explosive and effusive activity.

The Anyuy volcano lies 100 kilometres (62 mi) farther north. It and Aluchin form the Anyuy group of volcanoes which have erupted volcanic rocks with similar composition; their activity is associated with former and present-day plate boundaries in northeastern Russia.

== See also ==
- Aluchin Horst
- List of volcanoes in Russia
