= Blokhin Peak =

Mountain in Russia

- Пик Блохина
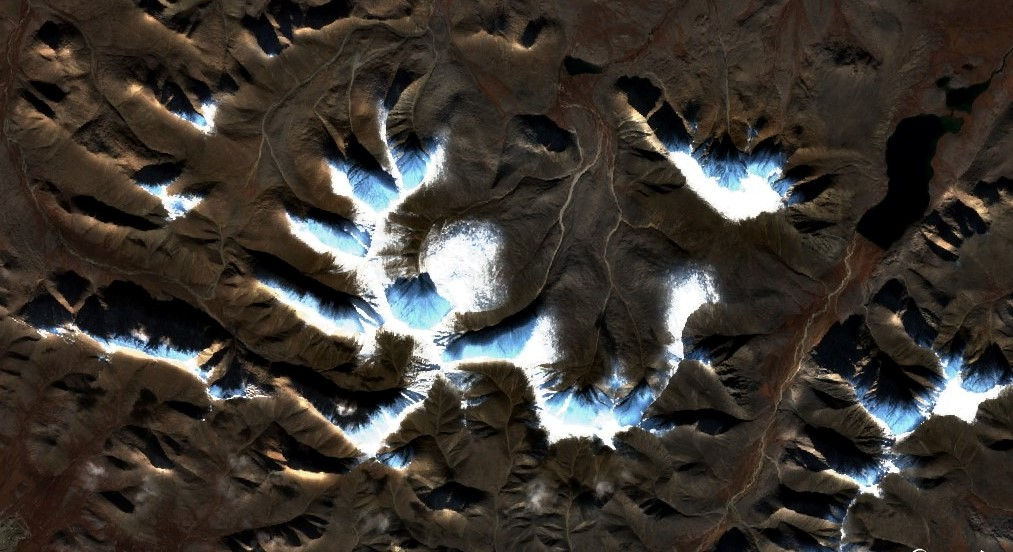
- Sentinel-2 image of the peak

Highest point
- Elevation: 1,779 m (5,837 ft)
- Prominence: 1,179 m (3,868 ft)
- Listing: Ribu
- Coordinates: 67°06′06″N 166°51′38″E

Geography
- Location within Chukotka Autonomous Okrug
- Location: Chukotka, Russian Far East
- Parent range: Anyuy Range; East Siberian Mountains

Blokhin Peak (Russian: Пик Блохина) is a mountain in the Anyuy Range. Administratively it is part of the Chukotka Autonomous Okrug, Russian Federation.

This 1,779 m (5,837 ft) high mountain is the highest point of the Anyuy Mountains. It is located a short distance to the north-northeast of Pik Sovetskoy Gvardii, the second-highest peak.

== See also ==
- List of mountains in Russia
