= Ush-Urekchen =

Mountain range in Russia

- Уш-Урэкчэн
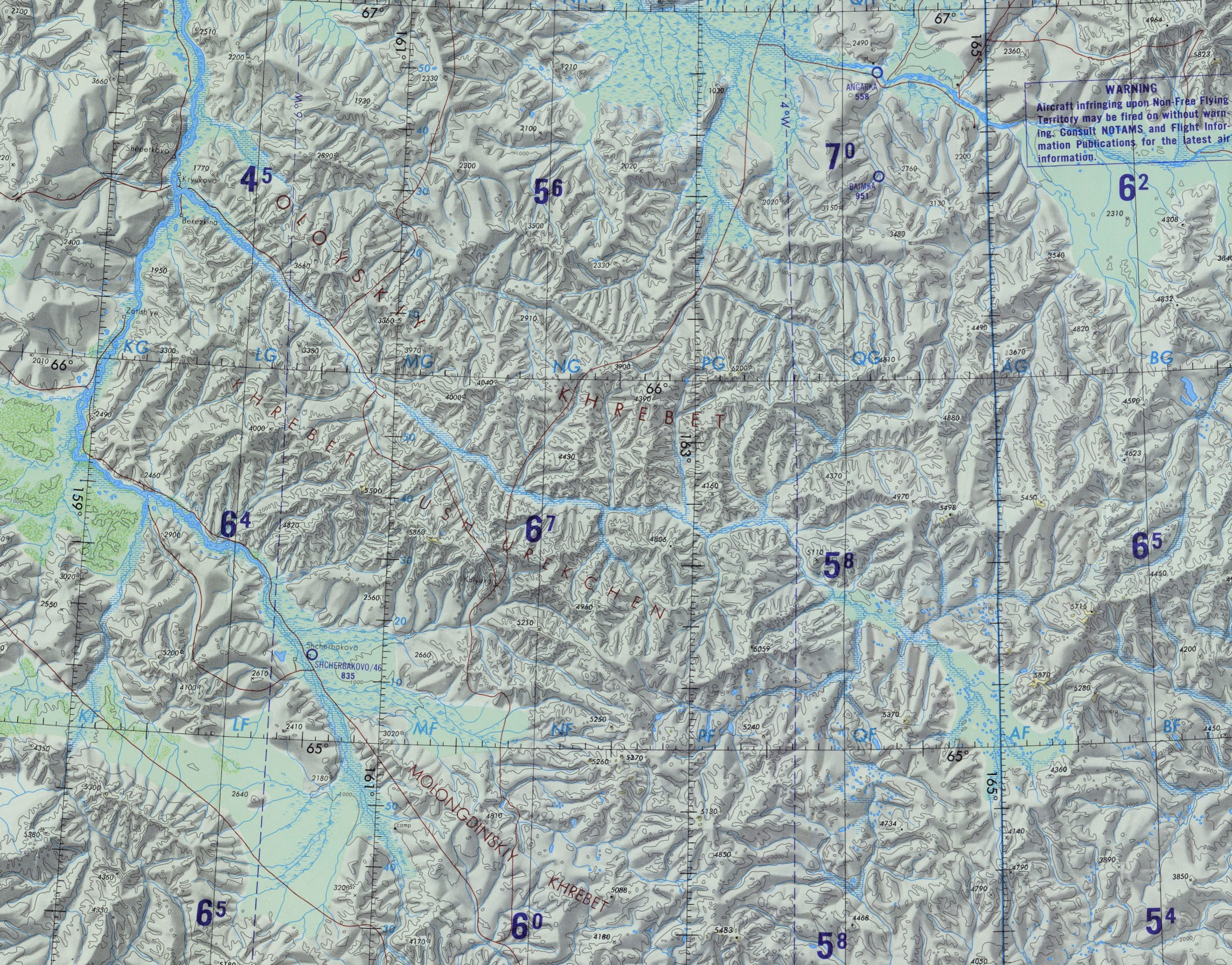
- Northern ranges of the Kolyma Highlands

Highest point
- Peak: Unnamed
- Elevation: 1,685 m (5,528 ft)

Dimensions
- Length: 230 km (140 mi) NW/SE
- Width: 40 km (25 mi) NE/SW

Geography
- Location within Far Eastern Federal District Location within Chukotka Autonomous Okrug
- Country: Russia
- Federal subject: Chukotka Autonomous Okrug, Kamchatka Krai
- District: Bilibinsky District, Penzhinsky District
- Range coordinates: 65°30′N 162°0′E
- Parent range: Kolyma Highlands, East Siberian System

Geology
- Orogeny: Alpine orogeny
- Rock ages: Devonian, Permian, Triassic and Jurassic
- Rock types: Granite, gabbro and effusive rock

Climbing
- Easiest route: From Omolon

The Ush-Urekchen (Russian: уш-урекчен), or Ushurakchan (Russian: Ушуракчан), is a mountain range in the Chukotka Autonomous Okrug and Kamchatka Krai, Far Eastern Federal District, Russia.

The range is composed of granite and gabbro intrusions, breaking through Devonian, Permian, Triassic and Jurassic sediments. There is extensive effusive rock cover in certain places.

== History ==
The Ush-Urekchen was first mapped in the summer of 1870 by topographer P. Afonasiev who was part of the 1868 - 1870 East Siberia expedition of Baron Gerhard von Maydell (1835–1894) and astronomer Karl Karlovich Neyman (1830s–1887). About 60 years later, at the time of the USSR, the range was surveyed in more detail in 1928 by hydrographer Ivan Molodykh (1897 - 1939) and in 1932-33 during aerial surveys carried out by geologist Sergei Obruchev (1891 - 1965).

== Geography ==
The Ush-Urekchen rises in the northernmost sector of the Kolyma Highlands System. The range runs in a roughly northwest / southeast direction for over 230 kilometers (140 mi), between the Oloy Range to the north and the Molongdin Range to the south, roughly parallel to both. The Omolon River limits the range to the southwest and makes a bend northwards at the western limit of the range. The Oloy river, a right tributary of the Omolon, limits the range to the north. The eastern end of the range is in Kamchatka Krai.

The mountains of the range are slightly pointed, some of them being flat-topped, and have a generally smooth profile, with average elevations between 900 m (3,000 ft) and 1,600 m (5,200 ft). The highest summit is a 1,685 metres (5,528 ft) high unnamed peak located in the central part of the range.

Many short rivers originate in the range, including tributaries of the Omolon such as the Karbaschan, of the Oloy, as well as rivers of the Penzhina basin in the southeastern area of range.

== Flora ==
There are sparse forests on some of the slopes and at the bottom of the valleys of the range up to elevations ranging from 500 m (1,600 ft) to 600 m (2,000 ft). The only vegetation cover at higher altitude is mountain tundra.

== See also ==
- List of mountains and hills of Russia
