= Pekulney Range =

Mountain range in the country of Russia

- Пэкульней
- Location within Chukotka Autonomous Okrug

Highest point
- Peak: Kolyuchaya
- Elevation: 1,362 m (4,469 ft)

Dimensions
- Length: 300 km (190 mi) NNE/SSW

Geography
- Location: Chukotka Autonomous Okrug, Far Eastern Federal District
- Range coordinates: 66°0′N 174°45′E
- Parent range: Chukotka Mountains; East Siberian System

Geology
- Orogeny: Alpine orogeny
- Rock age(s): Mesozoic and Cenozoic
- Rock type: sedimentary rock with igneous rock intrusions

The Pekulney Range (Russian: Пэкульней) is a range of mountains in far North-eastern Russia. Administratively the range is part of the Chukotka Autonomous Okrug of the Russian Federation. The area of the range is desolate and uninhabited.

The term "Pekulney" means "knife mountain" in the Chukchi language.

== Geography ==
The Pekulney Range is a southern prolongation of the Chukotka Mountains, part of the East Siberian System of ranges. This mountain chain runs in a roughly north/south direction for about 300 kilometres (190 mi), extending both north and south of the Arctic Circle. It is limited to the west by the Anadyr Highlands with the Osinov Range, and the Belaya River with its tributary Bolshaya Osinovaya. To the east the range is bound by the valley of the Tanyurer River. Both the rivers limiting the range to the west and to the east are flowing southwards. The highest point of the Pekulney Range is 1,362 metres (4,469 ft) high Kolyuchaya peak. At its southern end the range reaches the Anadyr Lowland.

There are four cirque glaciers on the mountains of the range, as well as some perennial snow fields, with a total area not exceeding 4 square kilometres (1.5 sq mi).

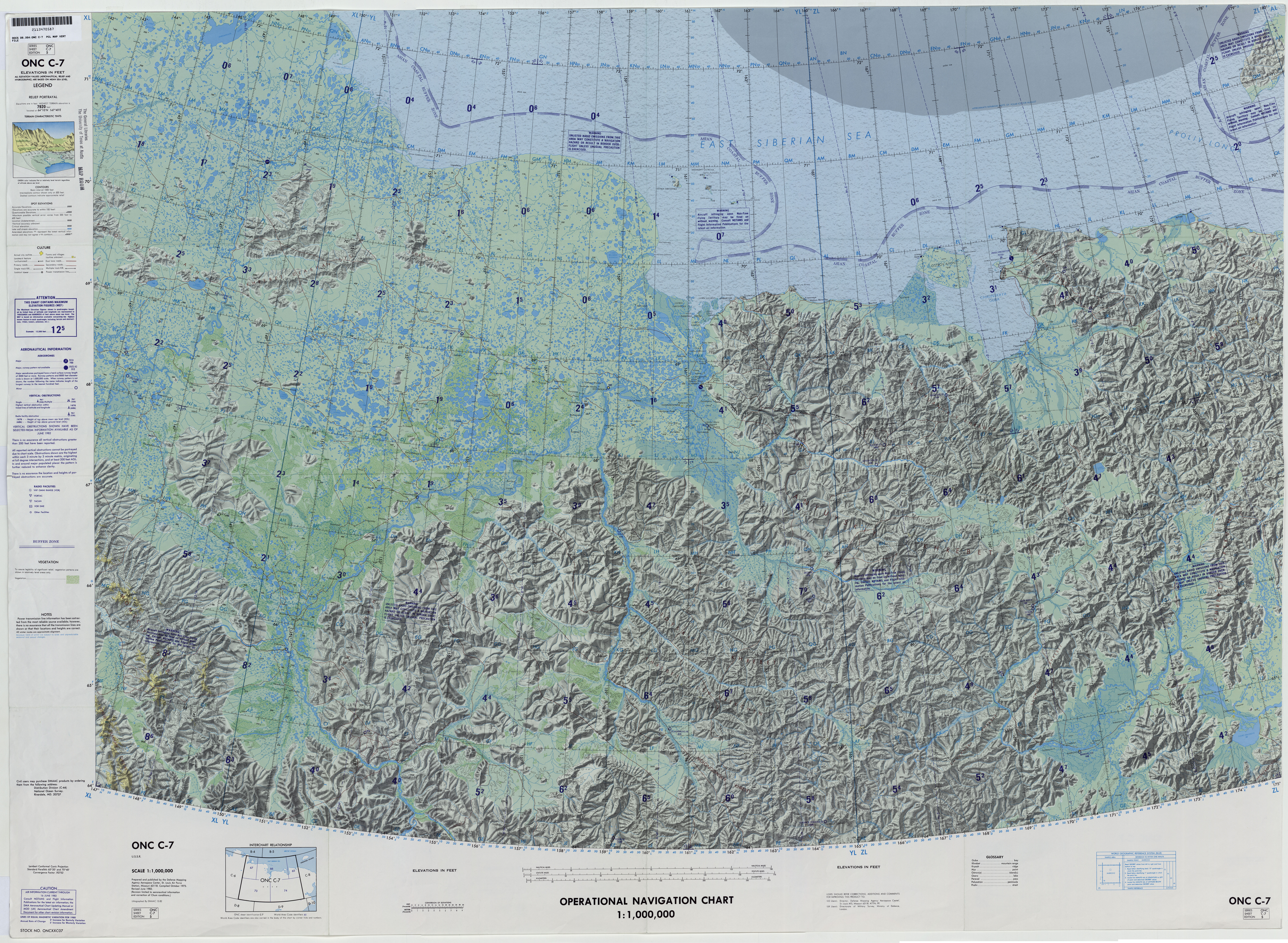
Defense Mapping Agency topographical map showing the area of the Pekulney Range on the right.

== Flora ==
The Pekulney Range has a barren look. The mountain slopes are covered with very little vegetation, mainly grasses, shrubs and "dwarf cedar", up to 300 metres (980 ft) to 500 metres (1,600 ft). At higher elevations there is only rocky mountain tundra. The climate of the area is subarctic.
