= Yablon (river) =

Yablon Яблон
- Mouth location in Chukotka, Russia

Location
- Country: Russia
- Federal subject: Chukotka Autonomous Okrug

Physical characteristics
- Source
  - location: Oloy Range; Kolyma Mountains
  - elevation: ca 1,200 m (1 mi)
- Mouth: Anadyr
  - coordinates: 65.3848°N 168.5485°E
- Length: 242 km (150 mi)
- Basin size: 9,280 km^{2} (3,580 sq mi)

Basin features
- Progression: Anadyr→ Bering Sea

The Yablon (Russian: Яблон) is a river in Chukotka Autonomous Okrug, Russia. It has a length of 242 kilometres (150 mi) and a drainage basin of 9,280 square kilometres (3,580 mi^{2}).

The Yablon is a right tributary of the Anadyr. The river and its tributaries are frozen for between eight and nine months every year. The nearest village is Markovo, located to the east of the mouth.

== History ==
The formerly unexplored Yablon river, was surveyed in March 1870 by geographer and ethnologist Baron Gerhard von Maydell (1835–1894) during his pioneering research of East Siberia.

== Course ==
The source of the Yablon is in the northeastern slopes of 1,787 m (5,863 ft) high Mount Snezhnaya, in the eastern section of the Oloy Range, Kolyma Mountains. The Yablon flows first northeastwards, then makes a wide bend roughly midway through its course and flows southeastwards splitting into multiple smaller channels. Finally it joins the right bank of the Anadyr a little upstream from the mouth of the Yeropol. The Yablon meets the Anadyr 759 kilometres (472 mi) from its mouth.

The river basin is in a desolate, mountainous area of Chukotka where there are no inhabited places. The main tributaries of the Yablon are the 78 kilometres (48 mi) long Krestovaya and 54 kilometres (34 mi) long Salamikha from the left, and the 88 kilometres (55 mi) long Golaya from the right.

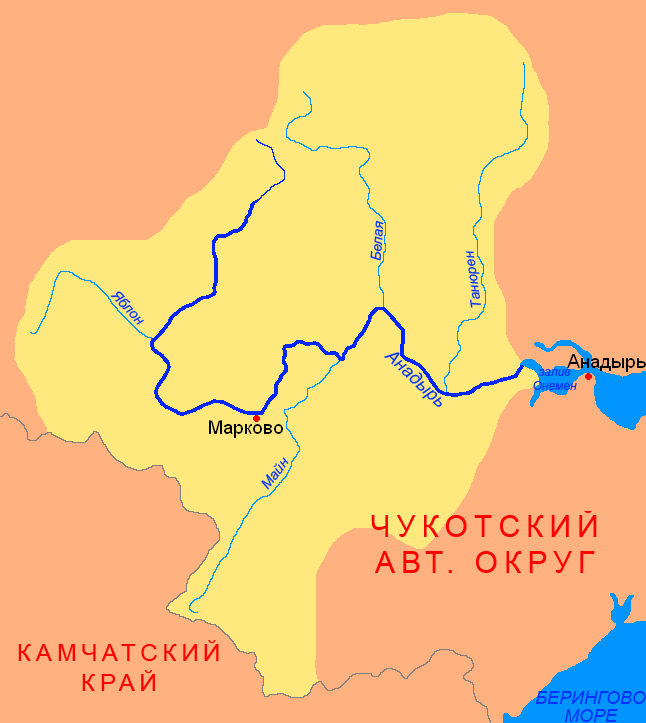
Anadyr basin with the Yablon on the left

== See also ==
- List of rivers of Russia
