= Lake Elgygytgyn =

Impact crater lake in Russia

Elgygytgyn Lake
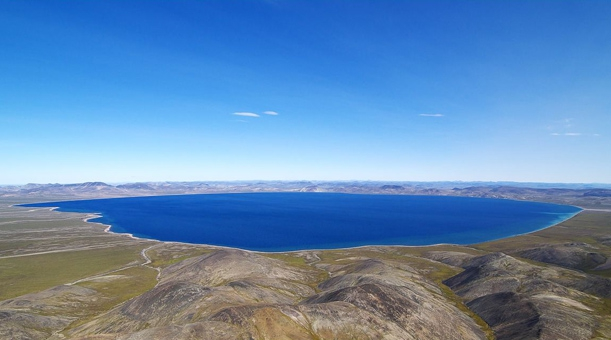
- View of the lake

- Location in Chukotka, Russia
- Location: Chukchi Peninsula, northeast Siberia
- Coordinates: 67°30′N 172°00′E
- Type: Impact crater lake, oligotrophic
- Primary outflows: Enmyvaam
- Catchment area: 293 km^{2} (113 sq mi)
- Basin countries: Russia
- Max. length: 12 km (7.5 mi)
- Max. width: 12 km (7.5 mi)
- Surface area: 110 km^{2} (42 sq mi)

Lake Elgygytgyn, also transcripted El'gygytgyn, (Russian and Chukchi: Эльгыгытгын) is a crater lake in Anadyrsky District, Chukotka Autonomous Okrug in northeast Siberia, about 150 km (93 mi) southeast of Chaunskaya Bay.

The word "Elgygytgyn" means "white lake" in the Chukchi language.

The lake is of particular interest to scientists because it has never been covered by glaciers. This has allowed the uninterrupted build-up of 400 m (1,300 ft) of sediment at the bottom of the lake, recording information on prehistoric climate change.

== Geography ==
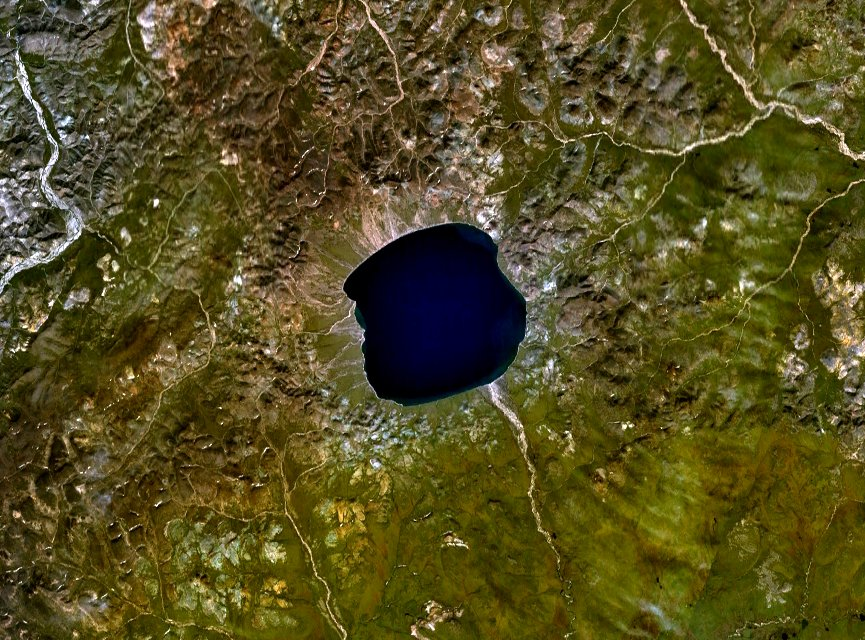
Landsat 7 satellite image of the lake

Lake Elgygytgyn is an impact crater lake located in the Anadyr Plateau, part of the Anadyr Highlands. It is drained to the southeast by the Enmyvaam, a tributary of the Belaya. It is approximately 12 km (7 mi) in diameter and has a maximum depth of 174 ± 2 m (571 ± 7 ft). The lake is centered within an impact crater with a rim diameter of 18 km (11 mi) that formed 3.6 million years ago during the Pliocene. Before it was reliably dated, preliminary papers in the late 1970s suggested either Elgygytgyn or Zhamanshin as the source of the young Australasian strewnfield.

== Scientific drilling ==
In late 2008 and early 2009, an international team conducted a drilling program targeting three holes in Elgygytgyn Lake. The resulting cores are designated ICPD Site 5011-1 and 5011-3.

This resulted in two papers, both of which demonstrated the significant impact of polar amplification. During the Pleistocene, Lake El'gygytgyn was found to have experienced numerous "super interglacials," with temperatures approximately 4–5°C higher and precipitation approximately 300mm higher than experienced during the Holocene epoch. In the mid-Pliocene Warm Period, when atmospheric carbon dioxide concentrations were likely similar to today, summer temperatures at Lake El'gygytgyn were approximately 8°C higher. Some results of the Lake El'gygytgyn Drilling Project were presented by over 50 scientists in a special issue of Climate of the Past and a special issue of Meteoritics and Planetary Science.

== Fauna ==
The conditions in Elgygytgyn lake are extremely severe for fish life, being classed as an ultra-oligotrophic lake and the surface covered by ice for around 10 months of the year. Even so, there are three species permanently inhabiting the lake's harsh aquatic environment, all species of char. These are Salvelinus boganidae (Boganid Char), S. elgyticus (Small-mouth Char) and Salvethymus svetovidovi (Long-finned Char). The two latter species are endemic to the Elgygytgyn lake. All three species are adapted to the lake's extremely cold waters, which are generally just above the freezing point, and spend most of the year in total darkness. The ice may start to melt in the summer, but some years it never fully thaws. The lake is also home to more than a dozen endemic diatoms.

== See also ==
- List of lakes of Russia
