= Oloy Range =

Mountain in Russia

- Олойский хребет
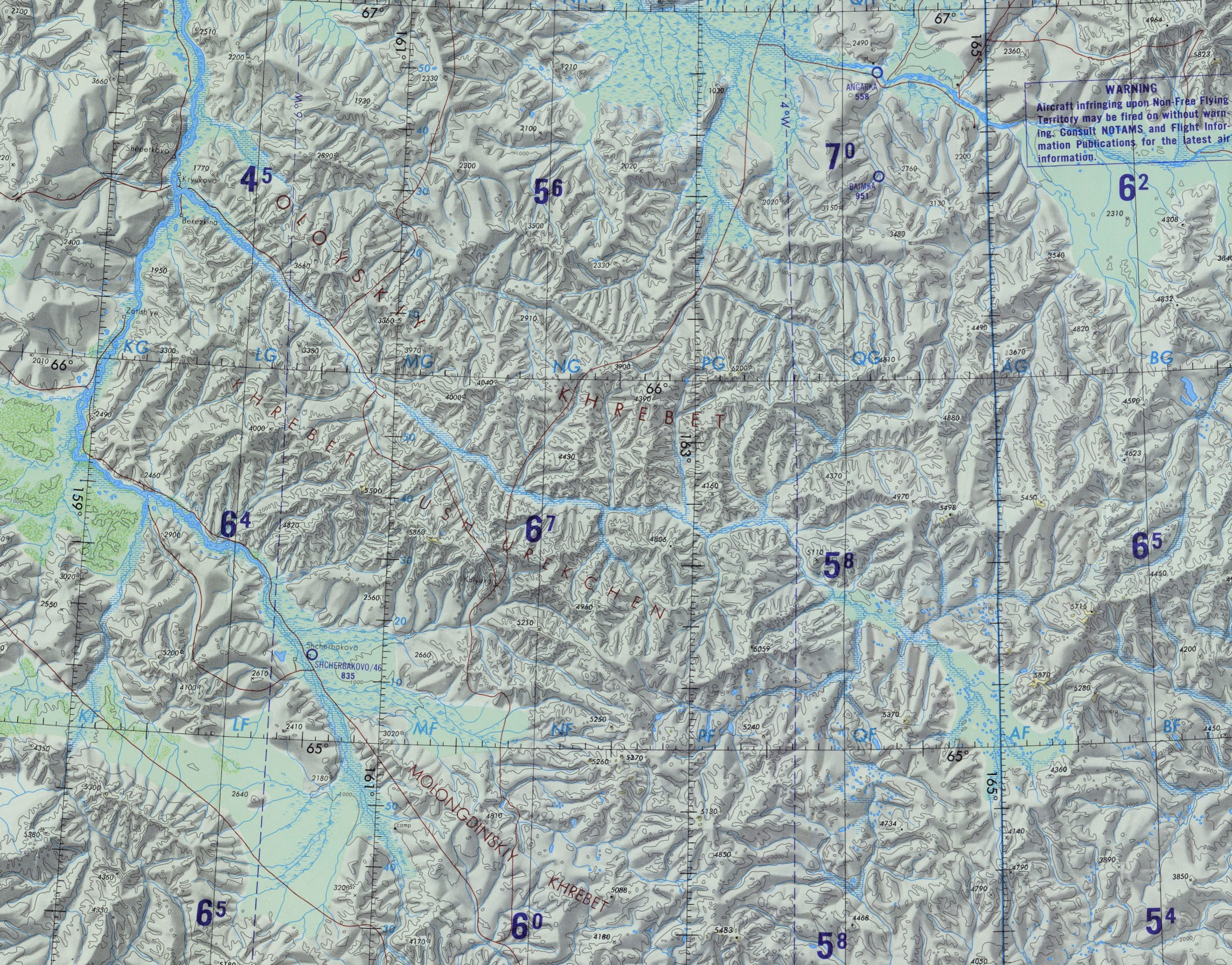
- Northern ranges of the Kolyma Highlands

Highest point
- Peak: Unnamed
- Elevation: 1,816 m (5,958 ft)
- Coordinates: 66°01′26″N 163°14′08″E

Dimensions
- Length: 350 km (220 mi) NW/SE
- Width: 50 km (31 mi) NE/SW

Geography
- Location within Far Eastern Federal District Location within Chukotka Autonomous Okrug
- Country: Russia
- Federal subject: Chukotka Autonomous Okrug
- District: Bilibinsky District
- Range coordinates: 66°0′N 166°25′E
- Parent range: Kolyma Highlands, East Siberian System

Geology
- Orogeny: Alpine orogeny
- Rock ages: Cretaceous and Mesozoic
- Rock types: Sandstone, siltstone and andesitic tuff

Climbing
- Easiest route: From Omolon

The Oloy Range (Russian: Олойский хребет) is a mountain range in the Chukotka Autonomous Okrug, Far Eastern Federal District, Russia.

The range is composed of sandstones, siltstones and andesitic tuffs with granodiorite intrusions.

== History ==
The Oloy Range was first mapped in the summer of 1870 by topographer P. Afonasiev who was part of the 1868 - 1870 East Siberia expedition of Baron Gerhard von Maydell (1835–1894) and astronomer Karl Karlovich Neyman (1830s–1887).

== Geography ==
The Oloy Range rises in the northernmost sector of the Kolyma Highlands System. The range runs in a roughly northwest / southeast direction for over 350 kilometers (220 mi), between the Anyuy Range to the north and the Ush-Urekchen to the south, roughly parallel to both. The Omolon River marks its western limit, the Oloy river, a right tributary of the Omolon, limits it to the south. The Oloychan valley forms the northern boundary, while the eastern limit is not clearly delimited. The highest mountain of the range is a 1,816 metres (5,958 ft) high peak located in the central part of the range, not far to the west of 1,301 metres (4,268 ft) high Gora Shebenochnaya. Another important peak is 1,787 m (5,863 ft) high Mount Snezhnaya, rising in the eastern section.

Many rivers originate in the Oloy Range, including tributaries of the Omolon, such as the Oloychan, of the Bolshoy Anyuy, such as the Pezhenka (Пеженка), as well as of the Anadyr, such as the Yablon and the Yeropol which have their sources in the eastern area of range.

== Flora ==
The slopes of the Oloy Mountains are largely bare and have a barren look, the only vegetation cover being mountain tundra. In certain locations there are thickets of dwarf Siberian pine. There is larch undergrowth along the valleys.

== See also ==
- List of mountains and hills of Russia
