= Yeropol =

Yeropol Еропол
- Mouth location in Chukotka, Russia

Location
- Country: Russia
- Federal subject: Chukotka Autonomous Okrug
- District: Anadyrsky District

Physical characteristics
- Source
  - location: Oloy Range; Kolyma Mountains
  - coordinates: 64°50′57″N 165°22′42″E
  - elevation: 618 m (2,028 ft)
- Mouth: Anadyr
  - coordinates: 65°15′09″N 168°37′37″E
  - elevation: 148 m (486 ft)
- Length: 261 km (162 mi)
- Basin size: 10,700 km^{2} (4,100 sq mi)

Basin features
- Progression: Anadyr→ Bering Sea

The Yeropol (Russian: Еропол) is a river in Chukotka Autonomous Okrug, Russia. It has a length of 261 kilometres (162 mi) and a drainage basin of 10,700 square kilometres (4,100 mi^{2}).

The Yeropol is a right tributary of the Anadyr, and its basin is in a mountainous area of Chukotka. The village of Chuvanskoye is located in the middle course of the river. The name of the river originated in the Yukaghir language.

== History ==
The Yeropol river was known to Russian explorers since the 17th century.

In 1984 two archeological sites were discovered in the upper reaches of the Yeropol. There are remains of different eras, ranging from the Mesolithic to the Neolithic.

== Course ==
The source of the Yeropol is in the eastern section of the Oloy Range, 60 km (37 mi) to the south of 1,787 m (5,863 ft) high Mount Snezhnaya. The river heads first southeastwards in its upper course, then it bends and flows in a steady ENE direction until its mouth. In its last stretch it enters a plain bound by mountains on both sides, where it divides into multiple branches. Finally it joins the right bank of the Anadyr a little downstream from the mouth of the Yablon, 740 kilometres (460 mi) from its mouth.

The main tributaries of the Yeropol are the 102 kilometres (63 mi) long Umkuveyem and 85 kilometres (53 mi) long Atakhayevskaya from the left. The river and its tributaries are frozen for between eight and nine months every year.

== See also ==
- List of rivers of Russia
