= Anyuyskiy =

Volcano in Far Eastern Russia

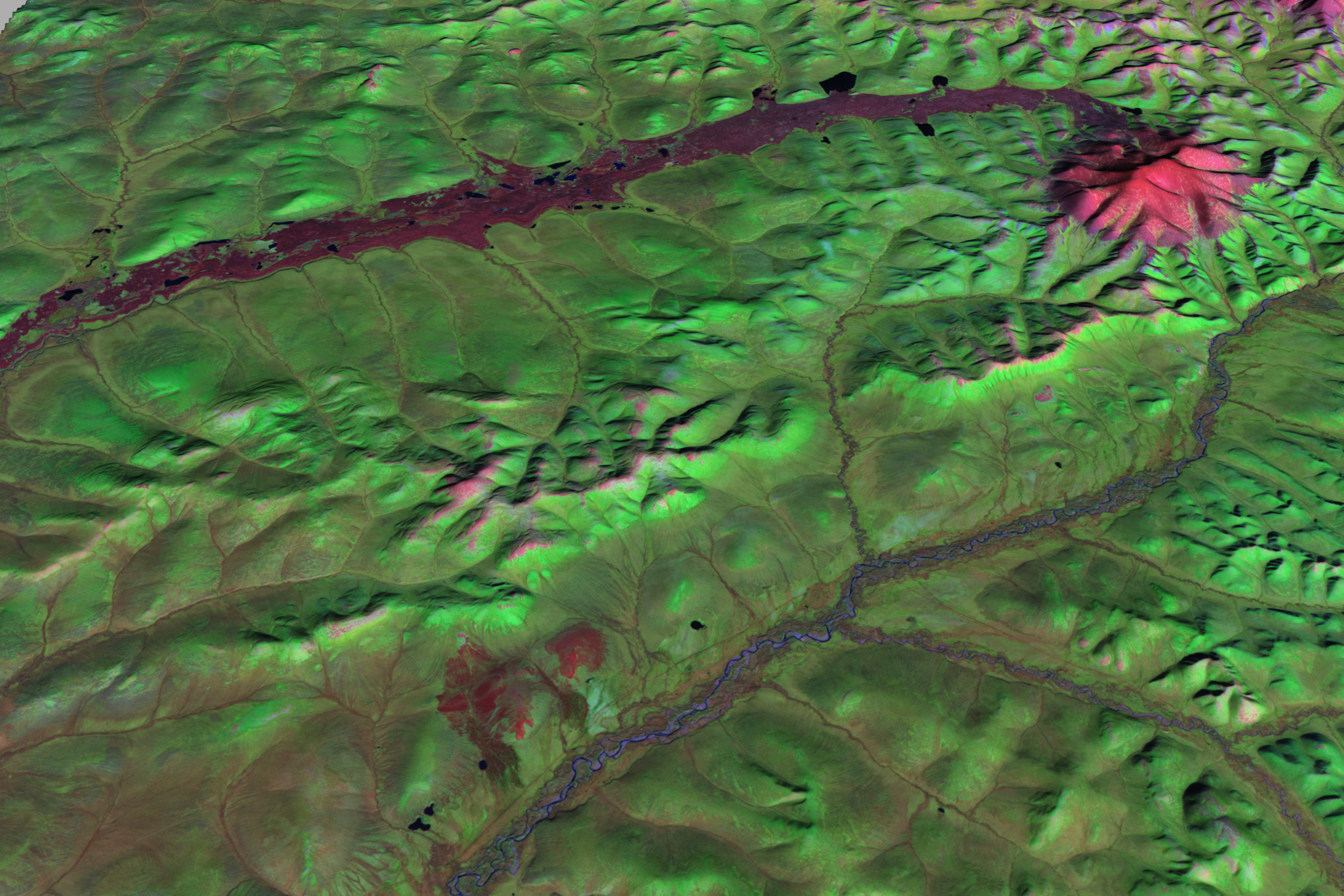
- Satellite view of Anyuyskiy

Highest point
- Elevation: 1,054 m (3,458 ft)
- Coordinates: 67°10′27″N 165°50′8″E

Geography
- Location within Far Eastern Federal District
- Location: Russia
- Parent range: Anyuy Range

Anyuyskiy (Russian: Анюйский Вулкан; Annuyskiy Vulkan) is an extinct volcano in the Anyuy Mountains, Chukotka Autonomous Okrug, Far Eastern Russia. It is formed by two systems: one is formed by long lava flows which disrupted the valley of the Monni River. Later, a volcanic cone formed, experiencing explosive activity and eventually extruding a long lava flow.

The volcano erupted more than one cubic kilometre of lava. It was considered to have been active during the 14th and 18th centuries, but radiometric dating has shown ages of almost 250,000 years ago.

The volcano is also known as Molodykh, Monni and Ustieva. Anyuyskiy was discovered in 1952 on aerial images.

== Geology ==
Anyuyskiy is in the valley of the Monni River, in the southern Anyuy Mountains, part of the East Siberian System. Late Quaternary volcanic activity appears to be linked to tectonic activity in the area. A change in volcanic activity from linear vents to central vents has been noted.

The volcano is constructed on the slopes of the 1,585 metres (5,200 ft) high Mount Vulkannaya, a mountain which is a Cretaceous intrusion in the Anyuy Mountains. The mountain underwent partial collapse just before the Anyuyskiy volcano formed. The volcano together with Aluchin and Bilibin forms a group of volcanoes which were active in the late Pleistocene era.

Volcanic activity at Anyuyskiy probably began with lava flows. These three lava flows have a total volume of 3 cubic kilometres (0.72 cu mi) and cover 100 square kilometres (39 sq mi). In these 30 metres (98 ft) thick lava flows lava lakes, lava tubes, and 10–15 metres (33–49 ft) high swells have been found. This volcanic activity filled the valley of the Monni River and disrupted the course of its tributaries, resulting in the formation of a number of lakes. Characteristically, the lava flows slope from north to south, because the fissure vents are on the north side of the valley. Some of these fissure vents are exposed, forming ridges of lava. The lava flows probably interacted with permafrost soils.

The volcanic cone Aniusk is between 90–120 metres (300–390 ft) high and has a base diameter of 490 metres (1,610 ft). The volume of the cone is about 0.011 cubic kilometres (0.0026 cu mi). It formed over a granitoid intrusion, in the headwaters of one of the rivers that feed the Monni, on the slopes of the 1,585-metre-high (5,200 ft) mountain Vulcannaya. The cone is situated within a cone whose slopes were partially covered by eruption products. The cone is capped with a 300 metres (980 ft) wide and 75-metre-deep (246 ft) crater. Aniusk has been the source of explosive activity and a 16-kilometre-long (9.9 mi) lava flow with a volume of 0.48 cubic kilometres (0.12 cu mi). This lava flow has an ʻaʻā morphology, but other components exist as well. The activity of this cone commenced with explosive activity and ended with the extrusion of the lava flow, which buried part of the fissure fed lava flow. Notably, lava fountains have been computed to have reached heights of 300–350 metres (980–1,150 ft). Tephra from the eruption fell to distances of tens of kilometres from the volcano. Another crater is 2 metres (6 ft 7 in) farther southwest. The existence of small pyroclastic cones has also been reported.

The lava flows erupted by the fissure vents are formed by trachybasalt. The rocks become more basic the younger they are. The chemistry of these rocks is typical for volcanic rocks of East Asia. The vent ridges of the fissure-fed lava flows have red-brown colours, while the associated lava flows are black and mostly lack gas bubbles.

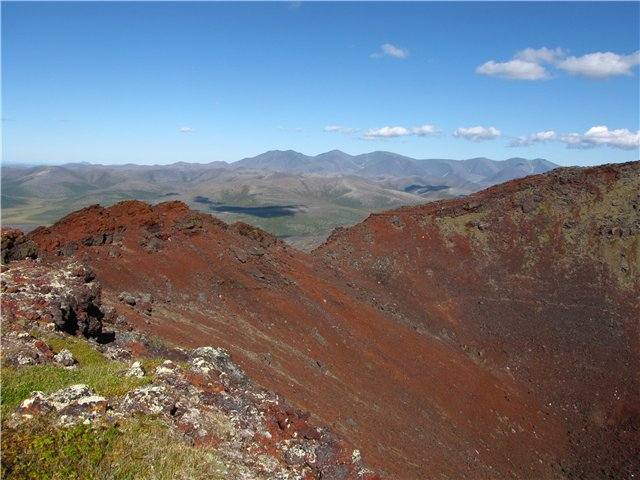
View of the crater

The lava flow features are well conserved and there is little turf on the lava flows. Reports exist of volcanic activity in the 14th and the 18th century. This makes Anyuyskiy one of the few volcanoes in continental Asia outside of Kamchatka with historical activity. The fissure-forming eruption is likewise recent and probably occurred after the ice ages. It may have been seen by local people, leading to legends about places where hunting is banned and where smoke and fire comes out of the ground. Potassium-argon dating has yielded ages of 248,000 ± 30,000 years ago. Likewise, later evidence indicated that the volcano had interacted with glaciers and glacial meltwater, degrading its structure.

== See also ==
- Balagan-Tas
- List of volcanoes in Russia
