= Enmyvaam =

- Native name: Russian: Энмываам

Location
- Country: Russia

Physical characteristics
- Source
  - location: Lake Elgygytgyn
  - coordinates: 67°26′02″N 172°11′47″E
  - elevation: 499 m (1,637 ft)
- Mouth: Belaya
  - coordinates: 66.2725°N 173.5524°E
  - elevation: 60 m (200 ft)
- Length: 285 km (177 mi)
- Basin size: 11,900 km^{2} (4,600 sq mi)
- Discharge
  - average: 95.95 cubic metres per second (3,388 cu ft/s)

Basin features
- Progression: Belaya→ Anadyr→ Bering Sea

The Enmyvaam (Russian: Энмываам, also spelled Enmywaam or Emmyvaam in English) is a river located in the Chukotka Autonomous Okrug in the Russian Far East, about 150 km (93 mi) southeast of Chaunskaya Bay. It is fed by and is the main and only outflow of Lake Elgygytgyn, draining into the Belaya, which drains into the Anadyr and eventually the Bering Sea.

The river flows in the southern direction. It is 285 kilometres (177 mi) long, and has a drainage basin of 11,900 square kilometres (4,600 sq mi). It is located within the Anadyr river basin in the Anadyr—Kolyma watershed district.

The name "Enmyvaam" comes from the Chukchi language and means "a river with rocky shores".
