= Oloy =

- Mouth location in Chukotka Autonomous Okrug

Location
- Country: Russia

Physical characteristics
- Source: Confluence of Left Oloy and Right Oloy; Ush-Urekchen; Kolyma Highlands
  - elevation: 633 m (2,077 ft)
- Mouth: Omolon
  - coordinates: 66.4665°N 159.4538°E
  - elevation: 129 m (423 ft)
- Length: 471 km (293 mi)
- Basin size: 23,100 km^{2} (8,900 sq mi)
- Discharge
  - average: 113 m^{3}/s (4,000 cu ft/s)

Basin features
- Progression: Omolon → Kolyma→ East Siberian Sea

The Oloy (Russian: Олой) is a river in Magadan Oblast in Russia, a right tributary of the Omolon (Kolyma's basin). The length of the river is 471 kilometres (293 mi). The area of its drainage basin is 23,100 square kilometres (8,900 sq mi). The river flows through sparsely populated areas of Chukotka.

== Course ==
It has its sources in the Ush-Urekchen range, at the confluence of Left Oloy and Right Oloy. It flows roughly northwestwards between the Ush-Urekchen to the south and the Oloy Range to the north.

== See also ==
- List of rivers of Russia
