= Tanyurer =

- Location of the mouth in the Chukotka Autonomous Okrug, Russia

Location
- Country: Russia
- Federal subject: Chukotka Autonomous Okrug

Physical characteristics
- Source
  - location: Pekulney Range
  - coordinates: 67°32′4″N 177°23′29″E
- Mouth
  - location: Anadyr
  - coordinates: 64°44′10″N 174°18′43″E
  - elevation: 1 m (3 ft 3 in)
- Length: 482 km (300 mi)
- Basin size: 18,500 km^{2} (7,100 sq mi)

Basin features
- Progression: Anadyr→ Bering Sea

The Tanyurer (Russian: Танюрер) is a river in Chukotka in Russia, a left tributary of the Anadyr. The length of the river is 482 kilometres (300 mi). The area of its drainage basin is 18,500 square kilometres (7,100 mi^{2}).

The whole basin of the Tanyurer and its tributaries belongs to the Chukotka Autonomous Okrug.

== Course ==
It flows roughly southwards from the Pekulney Range of the Chukotka Mountains and passes through the sparsely populated areas of Chukotka. This river meets the Anadyr in the lower stretch of its course, being the last large tributary of the Anadyr.

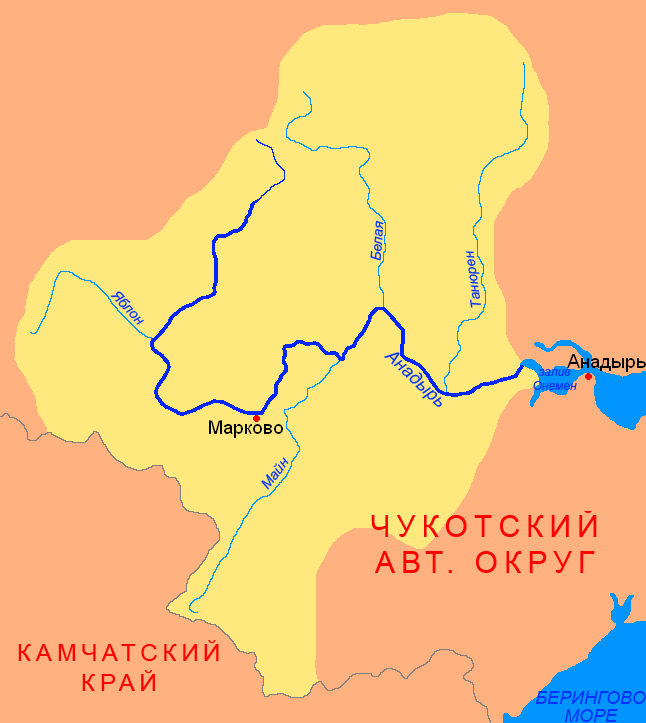
Anadyr basin.

== See also ==
- List of rivers of Russia
