= Anyuy (Kolyma) =

- Location of mouth in Russia

Location
- Country: Russia

Physical characteristics
- Mouth: Kolyma
  - coordinates: 68.5039°N 160.9442°E
- Length: 8 km (5.0 mi)
- Basin size: 107,000 km^{2} (41,000 sq mi)

Basin features
- Progression: Kolyma→ East Siberian Sea

The Anyuy (Russian: Анюй; Yakut: Өньүүй, Öñüüy) is a river in the Sakha Republic, Russia. It is a right tributary of the Kolyma, flowing into it in its delta area at Nizhnekolymsk, 153 kilometres (95 mi) upstream from the mouths of the Kolyma.

The Anyuy begins in a swampy area at the confluence of the Bolshoy Anyuy ("Great Anyuy") from the south, and the Maly Anyuy ("Little Anyuy") from the east, shortly before their combined waters flow into the Kolyma. Therefore the length of the Anyuy proper is just 8 kilometres (5.0 mi). The area of the basin of the whole Anyuy River system, however, is 107,000 square kilometres (41,000 mi^{2}).

The Anyuy may stay under the ice for up to nine months. The area is covered with tundra, marshes and small lakes.
