= Pik Sovetskoy Gvardii =

Mountain in Russia

- пик Советской Гвардии
- Location within Chukotka Autonomous Okrug

Highest point
- Elevation: 1,759 m (5,771 ft)
- Prominence: 1,047 m (3,435 ft)
- Listing: Ribu
- Coordinates: 66°49′59.3″N 166°34′10.2″E

Geography
- Location: Chukotka, Russian Far East
- Parent range: Anyuy Range; East Siberian Mountains

Pik Sovetskoy Gvardii (Russian: пик Советской Гвардии meaning "Soviet Guard Peak"), is a mountain in the Anyuy Range. Administratively, it is part of the Chukotka Autonomous Okrug, Russian Federation.

This 1,759 m (5,771 ft) high mountain is the second highest point of The Anyuy Mountains. It was named after the Soviet Guards.

== See also ==
- List of mountains in Russia
