= Bolshoy Anyuy =

Bolshoy Anyuy Большой Анюй
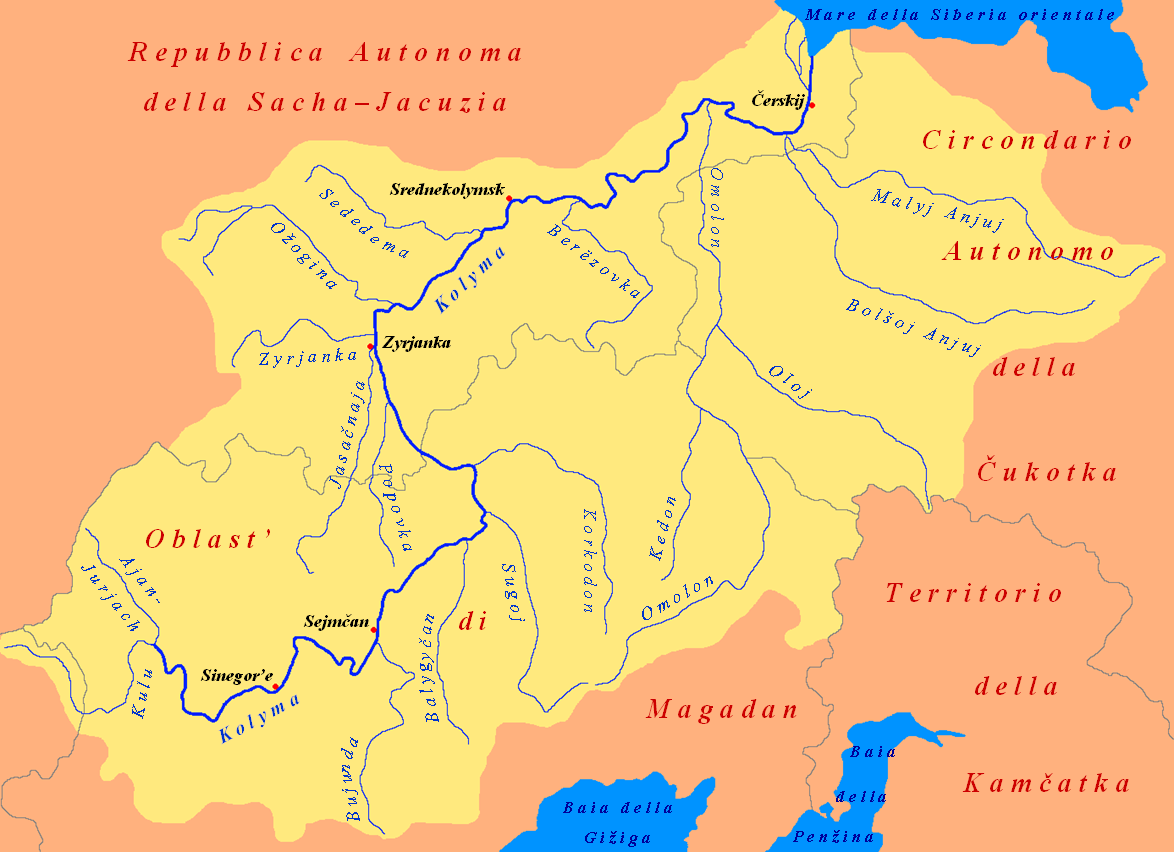
- The watershed of the Bolshoy Anyuy within the Kolyma basin.

- Location in the Far Eastern Federal District, Russia

Location
- Country: Russia

Physical characteristics
- Source: Anadyr Plateau
  - location: Chukotka Autonomous Okrug
  - coordinates: 66°40′3″N 168°44′36″E
  - elevation: 560 m (1,840 ft)
- Mouth: Anyuy
  - location: Sakha Republic
  - coordinates: 68°27′43″N 160°48′10″E
  - elevation: 0.2 m (7.9 in)
- Length: 693 km (431 mi)
- Basin size: 57,200 square kilometres (22,100 mi^{2})
- Discharge
  - average: 267 m^{3}/s (9,400 cu ft/s)

Basin features
- Progression: Anyuy→ Kolyma→ East Siberian Sea
- Tributaries
  - right: Orlovka

The Bolshoy Anyuy (Russian: Большой Анюй; "Great Anyuy") is a river in the Kolyma basin in Far East Siberia. Administratively most of the basin of the Bolshoy Anyuy and its tributaries belong to the Chukotka Autonomous Okrug of Russia.

== Geography ==
It flows roughly westwards and passes through the sparsely populated areas of Chukotka, its valley forming the southern border of the Anyuy Range. The Maly Anyuy joins it from the north near the Sakha Republic border and the combined river (now called the Anyuy) properly flows about 20 kilometres (12 mi) to meet the Kolyma at Nizhnekolymsk.

Its length is 693 kilometres (431 mi) and its basin area 57,300 square kilometres (22,100 mi^{2}).

== History ==
In 1650, Mikhail Stadukhin and Semyon Motora found a portage from the upper Bolshoy Anyuy to the upper Anadyr (probably its Yablon branch). This became the main cossack route from the Kolyma to the Pacific.
