= Anyuy Mountains =

Mountain range in Russia

Anyuy Range
- Анюйский хребет
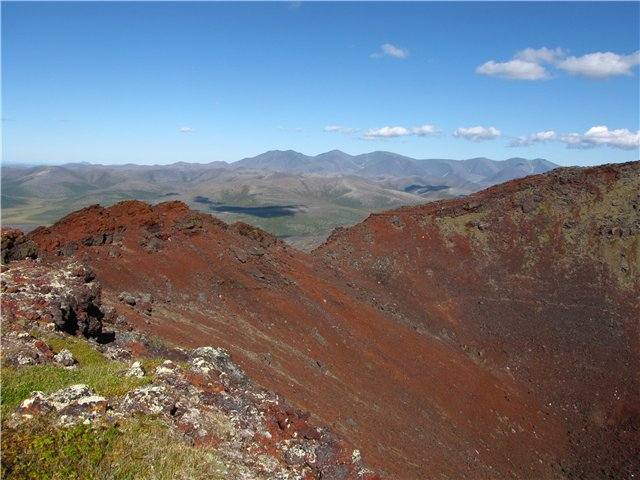
- Landscape of the range.

Highest point
- Peak: Blokhin Peak
- Elevation: 1,779 m (5,837 ft)
- Coordinates: 67°11′47.7″N 165°51′28.26″E

Dimensions
- Length: 380 km (240 mi) ENE/WSW
- Width: 80 km (50 mi) NNW/SSE

Geography
- Location within Chukotka Autonomous Okrug
- Location: Chukotka Autonomous Okrug, Russian Far East
- Parent range: East Siberian System

Geology
- Orogeny: Alpine orogeny
- Rock age(s): Upper Jurassic, Triassic
- Rock type(s): Sandstone, schist, mudstone and granite intrusions

Climbing
- Easiest route: from Bilibino

The Anyuy Mountains (Russian: Анюйский хребет; Anyuyskiy Khrebet), also known as South Anyuy Range, are a range of mountains in far north-eastern Russia. Administratively the range is part of the Chukotka Autonomous Okrug, Russia. The area of the range is largely uninhabited.

== Geography ==
To the north rises the Chuvanay Range and to the northeast the Ilirney Range, on the other side of the Maly Anyuy River. The Anyuy Range is part of the East Siberian System of mountains and is one of the subranges of the Anadyr Highlands. To the east of the eastern end of the range rises the Shchuchy Range, stretching in a roughly southwestern direction, and to the south of the range rises the roughly parallel Oloy Range of the Kolyma Mountains.

Although there are no glaciers in the range in present times, there is evidence of ancient glaciation. The Anyuy Range is drained by rivers Maly Anyuy, Bolshoy Anyuy, and Omolon. The highest point is 1,779 metres (5,837 ft) high Blokhin Peak (Пик Блохина) at 67°06′06″N 166°51′38″E, and the second highest 1,759 metres (5,771 ft) high Pik Sovetskoy Gvardii (Soviet Guard Peak).

In 1952 a volcano was discovered in the southern part of the range following examination of aerial images. The volcano was named Anyuyskiy.

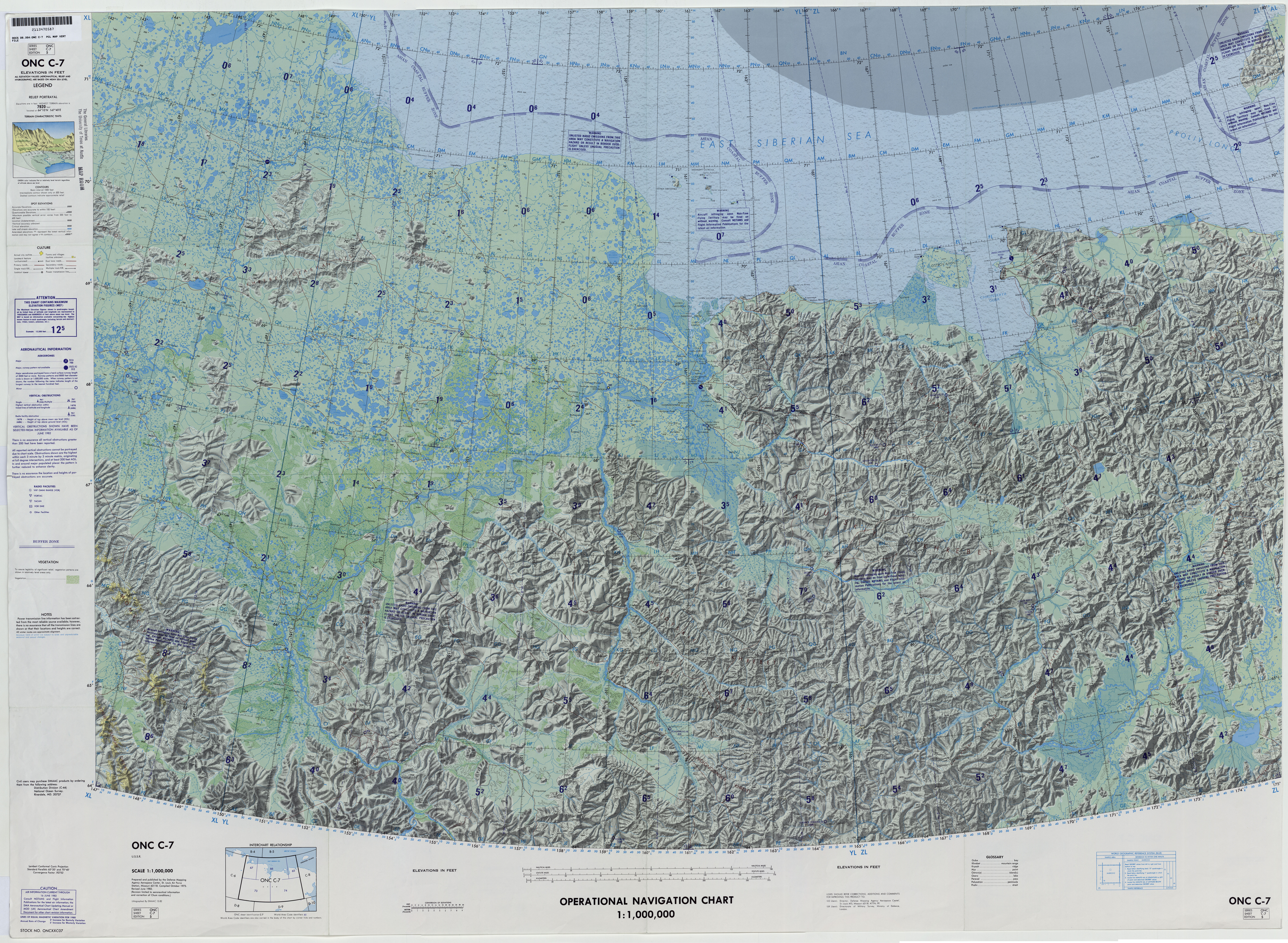
Defense Mapping Agency topographical map showing the area of the Anyuy Range on the right.

== Flora ==
There are sparse forests of larch in river valleys and the mountain slopes are covered with tundra vegetation, with rocky mountain tundra on the ridges and peaks.

== See also ==
- Anyuyskiy
- Kupol Gold Mine
