= Ministry of Education (Soviet Union) =

Government ministry of the Soviet Union

Ministry of Education of the USSR
- Министерство просвещения СССР
- All ministry seals of the Soviet Union used the Soviet coat of arms

Agency overview
- Formed: 3 August 1966
- Dissolved: 5 March 1988
- Superseding agencies: State Committee for People's Education (1988–1991); Ministry of Education of the Russian Federation (1991–1996); Ministry of Science, High School and Technical Policy of the Russian Federation (1991–1993)
- Jurisdiction: Government of the Soviet Union
- Headquarters: Moscow, Russian SFSR, Soviet Union

The Ministry of Education of the Union of Soviet Socialist Republics (USSR) (Russian: Министерство просвещения СССР), formed on 3 August 1966, was one of the most important government offices in the Soviet Union. It was known as the People's Commissariat for Education (Russian: Народный комиссариат просвещения), or Narkompros, until 1946. Narkompros was a Soviet agency founded by the State Commission on Education (Russian: Государственная комиссия по просвещению) and charged with the administration of public education and most of other issues related to culture.

Its first head was Anatoly Lunacharsky. However he described Nadezhda Krupskaya as the "soul of Narkompros". Mikhail Pokrovsky and Evgraf Litkens also played important roles.

Despite Lunacharsky's efforts to protect most of the avant-garde artists such as Vladimir Mayakovsky, Kazimir Malevich, Vladimir Tatlin and Vsevolod Meyerhold, the official policy after Joseph Stalin put him in disgrace.

Narkompros had a number of sections, in addition to the main ones related to general education, e.g.,

- Likbez, a section for liquidation of illiteracy,
- "Profobr", a section for professional education,
- Glavlit a section for literature and publishing (also in charge of censorship in publishing),
- "Glavrepertkom" (Главрепертком), a commission for approval of performers' repertoires.
- Department of the Mobilisation of Scientific Forces, to which the Russian Academy of Sciences reported to after 1918.
- A Theatre Department which published Vestnik Teatra
- Vneshkol'nyi Otdel, the adult Education Department run by Krupskaya

Some of these evolved into separate entities, others discontinued.

== History ==
The Ministry's predecessor, the People's Commissariat for Education of the Russian Soviet Federative Socialist Republic (RSFSR), was established by a decree of the second convocation of the All-Russian Congress of Soviets on 8 November [O.S. 26 October] 1917 and was part of the Sovnarkom. The first Commissar was Anatoly Lunacharsky appointed in 1917.

The Ministry of Education, at the all-Union level, was established on 3 August 1966. It was merged, on 5 March 1988, with the Ministry of Higher and Middle Special Education and the State Committee for Vocational and Technical Education to form the State Committee for People's Education of the Soviet Union headed by Gennady Yagodin from 11 March 1988 to 10 December 1991.

== Commissars and ministers ==
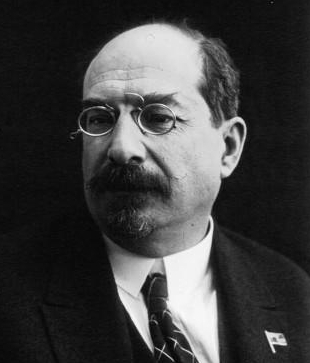
Anatoly Lunacharsky was the first and longest serving Soviet Narkom of Education.

The following persons headed the Commissariat/Ministry as commissars (narkoms) and ministers:

Name	Took office	Left office	Duration
People's Commissar for Education of the RSFSR
Anatoly Lunacharsky	26 October 1917	12 September 1929	11 years, 321 days
Andrei Bubnov	12 September 1929	12 October 1937	8 years, 30 days
Pyotr Tyurkin	12 October 1937	29 March 1940	2 years, 169 days
Vladimir Potemkin	29 March 1940	23 February 1946	5 years, 331 days
Minister of Education of the RSFSR
Aleksei Kalashnikov	9 April 1946	24 January 1948	1 year, 290 days
Aleksandr Voznesensky	24 January 1948	15 July 1949	1 year, 172 days
Ivan Kairov	15 July 1949	28 March 1956	6 years, 257 days
Yevgeniy Afanasenko	28 March 1956	4 May 1966	10 years, 37 days
Mikhail Prokofiev	4 May 1966	24 December 1966	234 days
Alexander Danilov	13 February 1967	27 November 1980	13 years, 288 days
Georgiy Veselov	15 January 1981	26 July 1988	7 years, 193 days
Minister of Education of the USSR
Mikhail Prokofiev	24 December 1966	20 December 1984	17 years, 362 days
Sergei Shcherbakov	20 December 1984	5 March 1988	3 years, 76 days

== Note ==
The Ministry of Religious Affairs and Public Education of the Russian Empire, which was formed by combining:

- Ministry of National Education (Russian Empire);
- The Chief Directorate of Religious Affairs of the Orthodox Faith of the Most Holy Synod;
- The Chief Directorate of Religious Affairs of Foreign (i.e. non-Orthodox) Faiths,

and directed the spiritual affairs of all faiths in Russia and the institutions of public education and science, trying to restore rights in East Slavic culture of Russian Federation.

== See also ==
- Education in the Soviet Union
- Ministries of the Soviet Union
- People's Commissariat for Education
- Ministry of Education and Science (Russia)
- Ministry of National Education (Russian Empire)

== Bibliography ==
- Bird, Alan. A History of Russian Painting. G.K. Hall Painting, Russian, 2007.
- Graham, Loren R. Science in Russia and the Soviet Union. Science—Soviet Union, 1993.
- Constantin, Nathan. A Study of Bolshevism. Free Press, 1953.
- Smele, Jon. The Russian Revolution and Civil War. Continuum International, 2003.
- Fitzpatrick, Sheila. The Commissariat of Enlightenment. Cambridge University, 1970.
