= Vera Schmidt (psychoanalyst) =

Russian psychoanalyst (1889–1937)

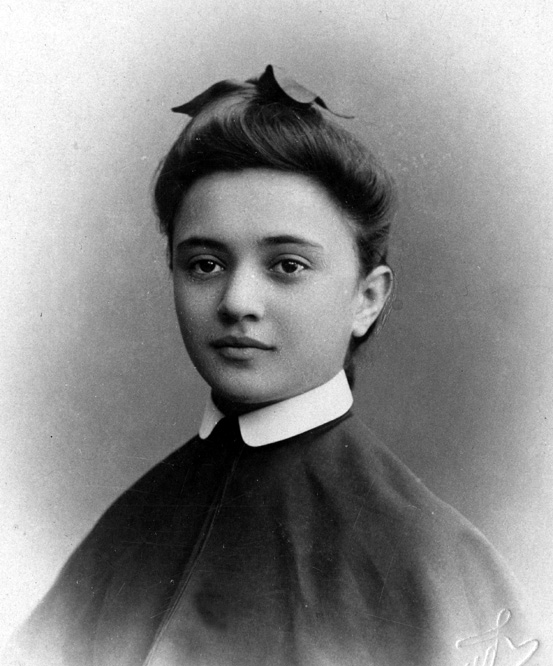
Vera Schmidt

Vera Fyodorovna Schmidt or Shmidt (Russian: Вера Фёдоровна Шмидт; née Yanitskaya; 27 July 1889 – 17 July 1937) was a Russian and Soviet psychoanalyst and educationist. After the 1917 Russian Revolution, she directed a highly innovative nursery school run on psychoanalytic principles.

== Early life ==
Vera Yanitskaya was born on 27 July 1889 in Starokonstantinov, in Volhynia Governorate of the Russian Empire (present-day Ukraine). She attended the Kiev Women's Educational Institute for three years from 1913 to 1916 where she received training in the methods of Friedrich Wilhelm August Fröbel. In 1913, she met and married Otto Schmidt, who was to become a renowned scientist and Arctic explorer.

By the outbreak of the revolution, they had both developed an interest in psychoanalysis and Vera, who spoke German, had read Sigmund Freud in the original. A supporter of the revolution, Otto Schmidt rose to positions of power and influence in the new Soviet regime becoming a member of a number of People's Commissariats including Narkompros (Narodnyi Komissariat Prosvescheniya, or the People's Commissariat for Education) and he was also employed as the director of the State Publishing House (Gosizdat) from 1921 to 1924. In this capacity, he was engaged in the publication of works by Freud and his daughter, Anna Freud.

== Psychoanalysis in Soviet Russia ==
In 1921, the Narkompros established the Russian Psychoanalytical Society in Moscow, a body that later came to contain, among others, figures like Alexander Luria, who, after the revolution, at only nineteen, was a leader of the Kazan Psychoanalytical Circle, and Mosche Wulff (Moshe Woolf) (1878–1971) who had promoted psychoanalysis during the pre-revolutionary "Silver Age". The president of the society was Ivan Ermakov who edited a nine-volume series of Freud's work in Russian. He later became known for his Freudian literary criticism of Alexander Pushkin and Nikolai Gogol. Otto Schmidt, in the meantime, became vice-president of the coordinating committee of the Moscow Psychoanalytic Society and the state-backed, Psychoanalytic Institute which was headed by Ermakov.

== The Detski Dom Laboratory ==
He was also officially responsible for the Detski Dom ("Children's Home", a Russian term for orphanage) which opened in May 1921 in the center of Moscow and shared with the Psychoanalytic Institute the magnificent Art Nouveau building in Malaya Nikitskaya Street designed by Fyodor Schechtel. This was the former home of Stepan Ryabushinsky a rich merchant and chair of the stock exchange who left Russia after the revolution. Although Ivan Ermakov, president of the Psychoanalytic Society and Institute, was nominally in charge of the home, it was run by Vera Schmidt assisted initially by fifty-one staff members, among whom was Mosche Wulff and the prominent psychoanalyst, Sabina Spielrein. She, along with Luria, joined the Russian Psychoanalytical Society in 1923 having formerly been a member of the Swiss Psychoanalytical Society and was one of only a few trained psychoanalysts in Soviet Russia.

A historian of the psychoanalytical movement in the early years of the Soviet Union described how the home was funded. He also indicated the elite familial background of the children who attended it. Later, that Party elite came to be known as the nomenklatura:

"The Detski Dom was funded partly by the State partly by the share in profits from Freud's publications in Russian, partly by international support from a German Trade Union. In 1923, 18 educators were busy with 12 children from 2 to 4 years old. According to the unpublished Charter of the Kindergarten written by Ermakov, "the major part of the children are children of the Party executives who give all their time to their work and are not able to rear their children (Ermakov Archive). In fact, it was an elite institution supported by the officials to keep their children in hard times. Luria recalled orally that among these children was the son of Stalin (Vasilii, born in 1921)."

Schmidt's own son, Vladimir, whose nickname was Wolik, also attended the Detski Dom and she recorded his, as well as the other children's activities, in journal. These were used as data regarding children's development by other Soviet psychologists such as Luria. The Detski Dom was virtually unique in its principles and practices and above all in its psychoanalytic approach. It was visited by several western Marxist psychoanalysts like Anna Mänchen-Helfen (1902–1991) and Annie Reich (1902–1971) together with her husband, Wilhelm Reich.

Due to the German Trade union's financial support, the home also became known as the Solidarity International Laboratory Home. When that support ended, financial problems, together with internal dissension weakened the organisation of the Detski Dom which also came under external pressure as the psychoanalytic approach came under attack from supporters of Joseph Stalin due to its association with his rival for power, Leon Trotsky. Associated with the rise of Stalin and the Communist Party's turn away from psychoanalysis was the new science of childhood named pedology which was promoted by Aron Zalkind (1888–1936) a former adherent of psychoanalysis but now its leading critic.

In early 1923, the Schmidts went to Vienna, where they met Freud. They discussed with him the children's Home and the activities of the psychoanalytic movement in Russia. They also met other analysts, such as Otto Rank and Karl Abraham. Discussions focused mainly on psychoanalysis and the organization of the collective educational system. Following their visit, the Russian Psychoanalytic Association, became an associate member of the International Psychoanalytic Association (IPA) in 1924 and later in 1927, Vera Schmidt became its secretary. In this year also, her book Psychoanalytical Education in Soviet Russia was published in Germany at Leipzig by the International Psychoanalytical Publishing House. This book was based on her experiences and observations in the Detski Dom and it was cited extensively by Wilhelm Reich.

On 14 August 1925, the Narkompros (Ministry of Public Education) closed the home and the building was later to become Gorky's home and later, the Gorky Museum. In an ironic turn of events, Stalin's son, Vasilii, Vasily Dzhugashvili occupied the site of his former nursery after Gorky's death.

== Later life and death ==
In 1930, after the Russian Psychoanalytical Society was dissolved she worked at the Academy of Pedagogical Sciences Experimental Institute of Defectology. The research carried out there was under the direction of Lev Vygotsky since its foundation in 1929.

Schmidt died at the age of 48 years while being operated on for a thyroid tumor to treat Graves' disease.

== Works ==
- Dnevnik materi: pervij god jizni (Diary of a mother: the first year of life) (2009). ISBN 978-5-98904-050-6
- Vera Schmidt SCRITTI SU PSICOANALISI INFANTILE ED EDUCAZIONE Edited by: Giuseppe Leo Prefaced by Alberto Angelini, Rita Corsa, Vlasta Polojaz Publisher: Edizioni Frenis Zero 248 pages, Year 2014, ISBN 978-88-97479-05-5

== Sources ==
- Brehony, K. J. (2006) Representations of Socialist educational experiments in the 1920s and 1930s: The place of the Sciences of Education. Passion, fusion, tension. New Education and Educational sciences - Education nouvelle et Sciences de l'éducation (end 19th-middle 20th century - fin 19e-milieu 20e siècle. R. Hofstetter and B. Schneuwly. Bern, Peter Lang. 271–304.
- Miller, M. A. (1998) Freud and the Bolsheviks: psychoanalysis in Imperial Russia and the Soviet Union. New Haven, Yale University Press.
- Reich, W. (1972) The sexual revolution: towards a self-governing character structure. London, Vision.
- Valkanova, Y. and K. J. Brehony (2006). "The 'Gifts' and 'Contributions'. Friedrich Froebel and Russian education from 1850 to 1920." History of Education 35(2): 189–207.
