= Otto Schmidt =

Soviet scientist and statesman (1891–1956)

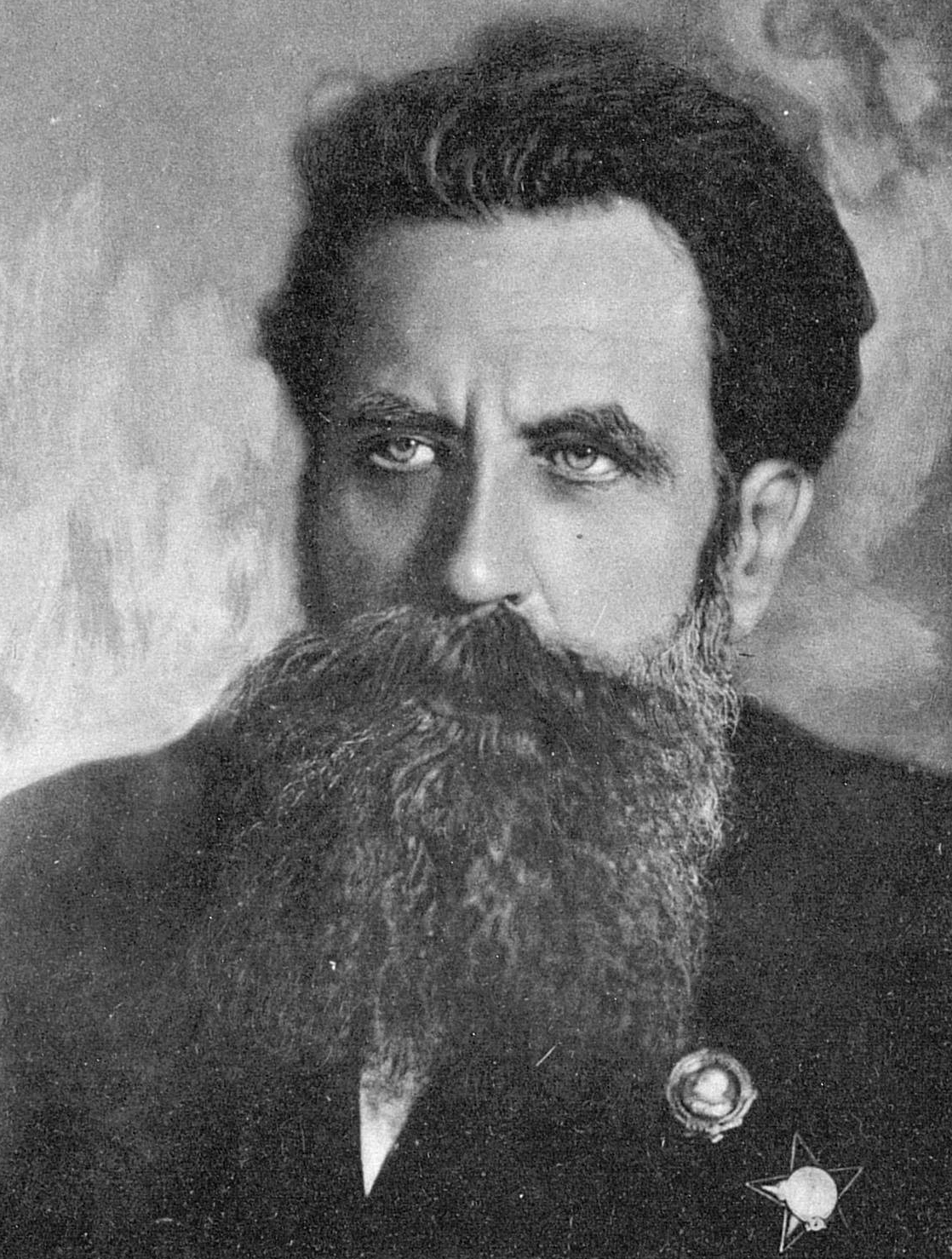
- Schmidt in 1938
- Born: 30 September [O.S. 18 September] 1891; Mogilev, Russian Empire
- Died: 7 September 1956 (aged 64); Moscow, Russian SFSR, Soviet Union
- Education: Saint Vladimir Imperial University of Kiev
- Known for: Krull–Schmidt theorem Accretion model Arctic exploration
- Spouse: Vera Yanitskaia (m. 1913)
- Awards: Hero of the Soviet Union
- Scientific career
- Fields: Mathematics; Astronomy; Geophysics
- Doctoral advisor: Dmitry Grave
- Doctoral students: Vladimir Andrunakievich

Otto Yulyevich Shmidt (Note: Russian: Отто Юльевич Шмидт; Belarusian: Ота Юльевіч Шміт, romanized: Ota Juljevič Šmit) (born Otto Friedrich Julius Schmidt; 30 September [O.S. 18 September] 1891 – 7 September 1956), better known as Otto Schmidt, was a Soviet scientist, mathematician, astronomer, geophysicist, statesman, and academician.

== Biography ==
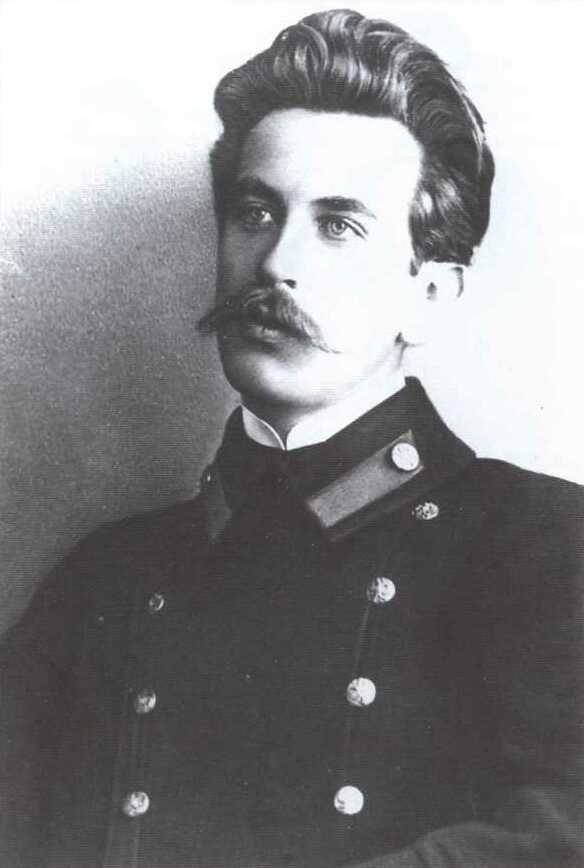
A young Schmidt in 1912

He was born in the town of Mogilev in the Russian Empire, in what is now Belarus. His father was a descendant of Baltic German settlers in Courland, while his mother was a Latvian. In 1912 and 1913, while in university, he published a number of mathematical works on group theory which laid foundation for Krull–Schmidt theorem.

In 1913, Schmidt married Vera Yanitskaia and graduated from the Saint Vladimir Imperial University of Kiev, where he worked as a privat-docent starting from 1916. In 1918 he became a member of the Russian Social Democratic Labour Party (Internationalists) which was later dissolved in to the Russian Communist Party. After the October Revolution of 1917, he was a board member at several People's Commissariats (narkomats) – such as Narkomprod from 1918 to 1920 (Narodnyi Komissariat Prodovolstviya, or People's Commissariat for Supplies), People's Commissariat for Finance from 1921 to 1922 (Narodnyi Komissariat Finansov, or People's Commissariat for Finances). Schmidt was one of the chief proponents of developing the higher education system, publishing, and science in Soviet Russia.

He worked at Narkompros (People's Commissariat for Education), the State Scientific Board at the Council of People's Commissars of the USSR, and the Communist Academy. He was Chair of the Foreign Literature Committee from October 1921. Following the Litkens Commission Schmidt was also employed as the director of the State Publishing House (Gosizdat) from 1921 to 1924, and chief editor of the Great Soviet Encyclopedia from 1924 to 1941. From 1923 he was a professor at the Second Moscow State University and later at the Moscow State University, and from 1930 to 1932, Schmidt was the head of the Arctic Institute. During this time he coined the term for the double bond rule that relates to allylic and similar systems.

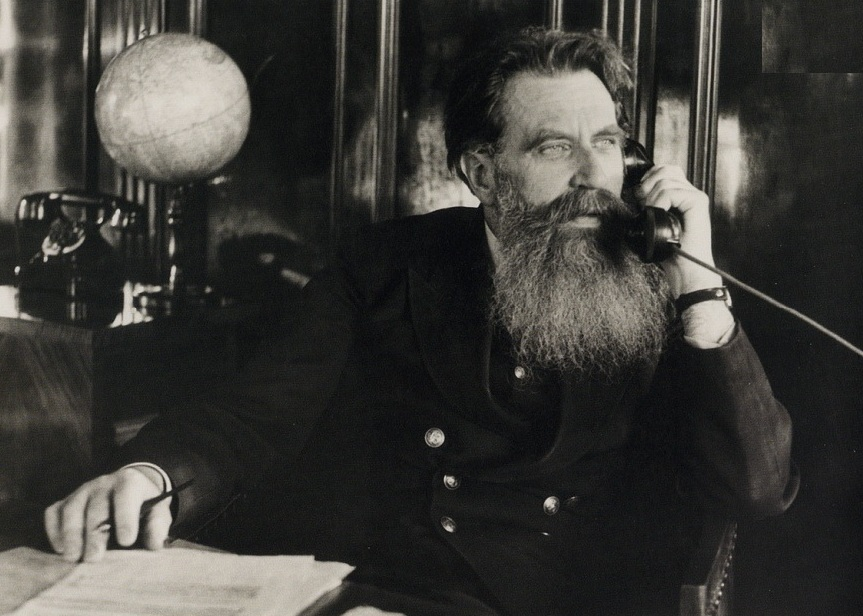
Schmidt in 1936

From 1932 to 1939, he was appointed head of Glavsevmorput' (Glavnoe upravlenie Severnogo Morskogo Puti) – an establishment that oversaw all commercial operations on the Northern Sea Route. From 1939 to 1942, Schmidt became a vice-president of the Soviet Academy of Sciences, where he organized the Institute of Theoretical Geophysics (he was its director until 1949). Otto Schmidt was a founder of the Moscow Algebra School, which he directed for many years.

In the mid-1940s, Schmidt suggested a new cosmogonical hypothesis on the formation of the Earth and other planets of the Solar System, which he continued to develop together with a group of Soviet scientists until his death.

=== Arctic ===
Schmidt was an explorer of the Arctic. In 1929 and 1930, he led expeditions on the steam icebreaker Georgy Sedov, establishing the first scientific research station on the Franz Josef Land, exploring the northwestern parts of the Kara Sea and western coasts of Severnaya Zemlya, and discovering a few islands.

In 1932, Schmidt's expedition on the steam icebreaker Sibiryakov with Captain Vladimir Voronin made a non-stop voyage from Arkhangelsk to the Pacific Ocean without wintering for the first time in history.

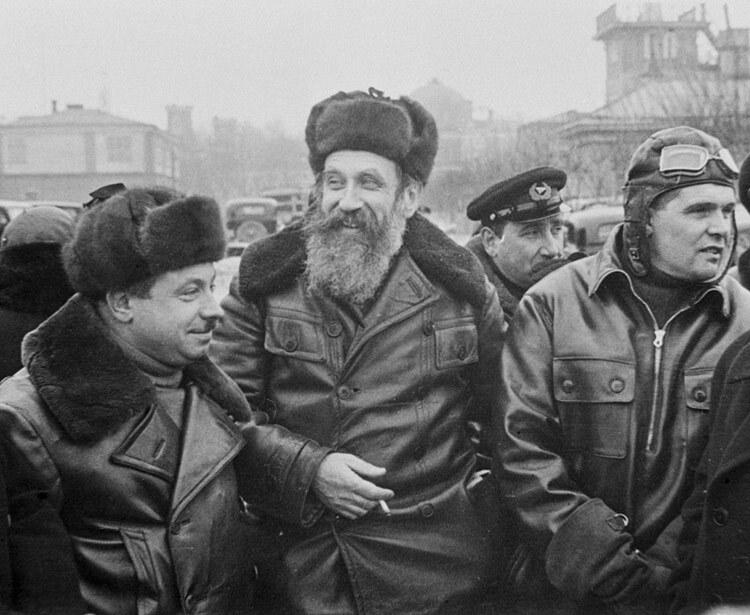
Otto Schmidt (centre) with Captain Ivan Papanin (left) and Mikhail Vodopyanov (right) in 1938

From 1933 to 1934, Schmidt led the voyage of the steamship Cheliuskin, also with Captain Vladimir Voronin, along the Northern Sea Route. In 1937, he supervised an airborne expedition that established a drift-ice station "North Pole-1". In 1938, he was in charge of evacuating its personnel from the ice.

Otto Schmidt was a member of the Central Executive Committee of the USSR and a deputy of the Supreme Soviet of the USSR of the first convocation (1938–1946).

== Legacy ==
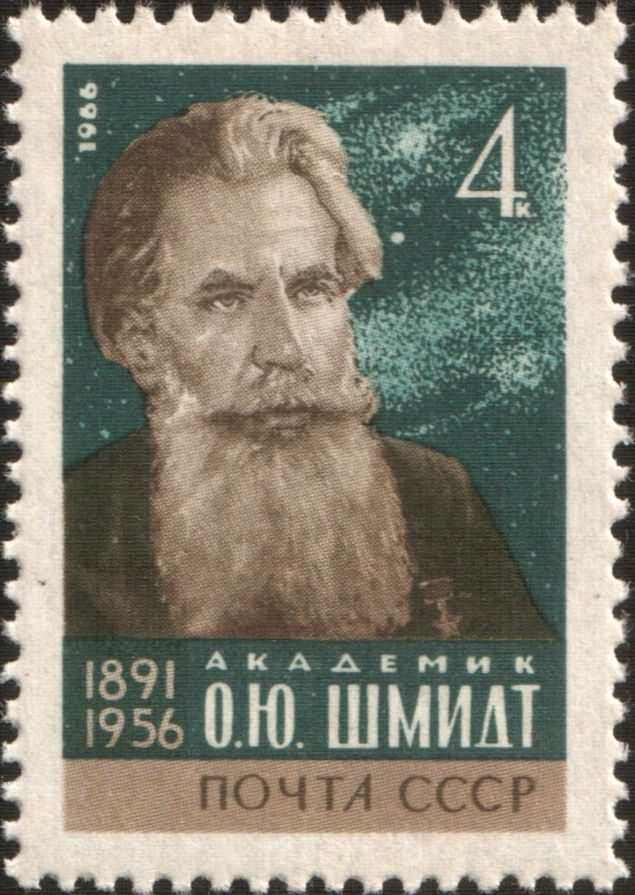
A soviet stamp dedicated to Otto Schmidt

The authorities awarded Otto Schmidt three Orders of Lenin, three other orders and many medals. Schmidt Island in the Kara Sea, Cape Schmidt on the coastline of the Chukchi Sea in Chukotka Autonomous Okrug, as well as the Institute of Earth Physics at the Soviet Academy of Sciences, among other places, bear Schmidt's name.

A minor planet, 2108 Otto Schmidt – discovered in 1948 by Soviet astronomer Pelageya Shajn – commemorates him.

The Soviet research vessel Otto Schmidt was named after him in 1979.

=== Honours and awards ===
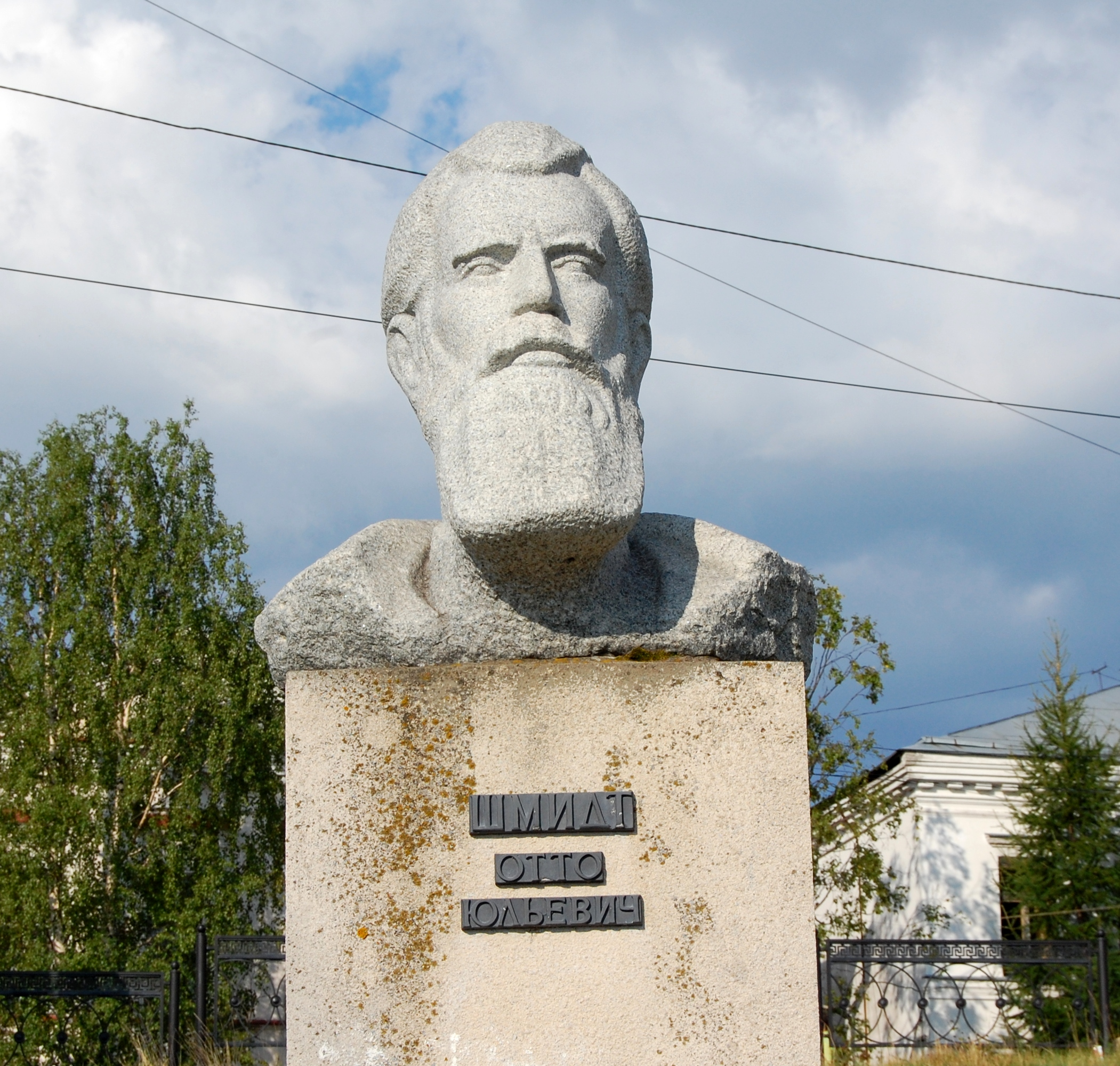
Bust of Otto Schmidt in Arkhangelsk

- Hero of the Soviet Union
- Order of Lenin, three times
- Order of the Red Banner of Labour, twice
- Order of the Red Star

== See also ==
- Chief Directorate of the Northern Sea Route
- Frobenius group

== Sources ==
- Aleksey E. Levin, Stephen G. Brush The Origin of the Solar System: Soviet Research 1925–1991. AIP Press, 1995. ISBN 1-56396-281-0
- Brontman, L.K. On top of the world: the Soviet expedition to the North pole, 1937–1938, New York, 1938.
- McCannon, John. Red Arctic: Polar Exploration and the Myth of the North in the Soviet Union, 1932–1939. New York: Oxford University Press, 1998.
- Otto Iul'evich Shmidt: Zhizn' i deiatel'nost'. Moscow: Nauka, 1959.
