= I. I. Karzinkin House =

I.I. Karzinkin House
- Доходный дом И. И. Карзинкина
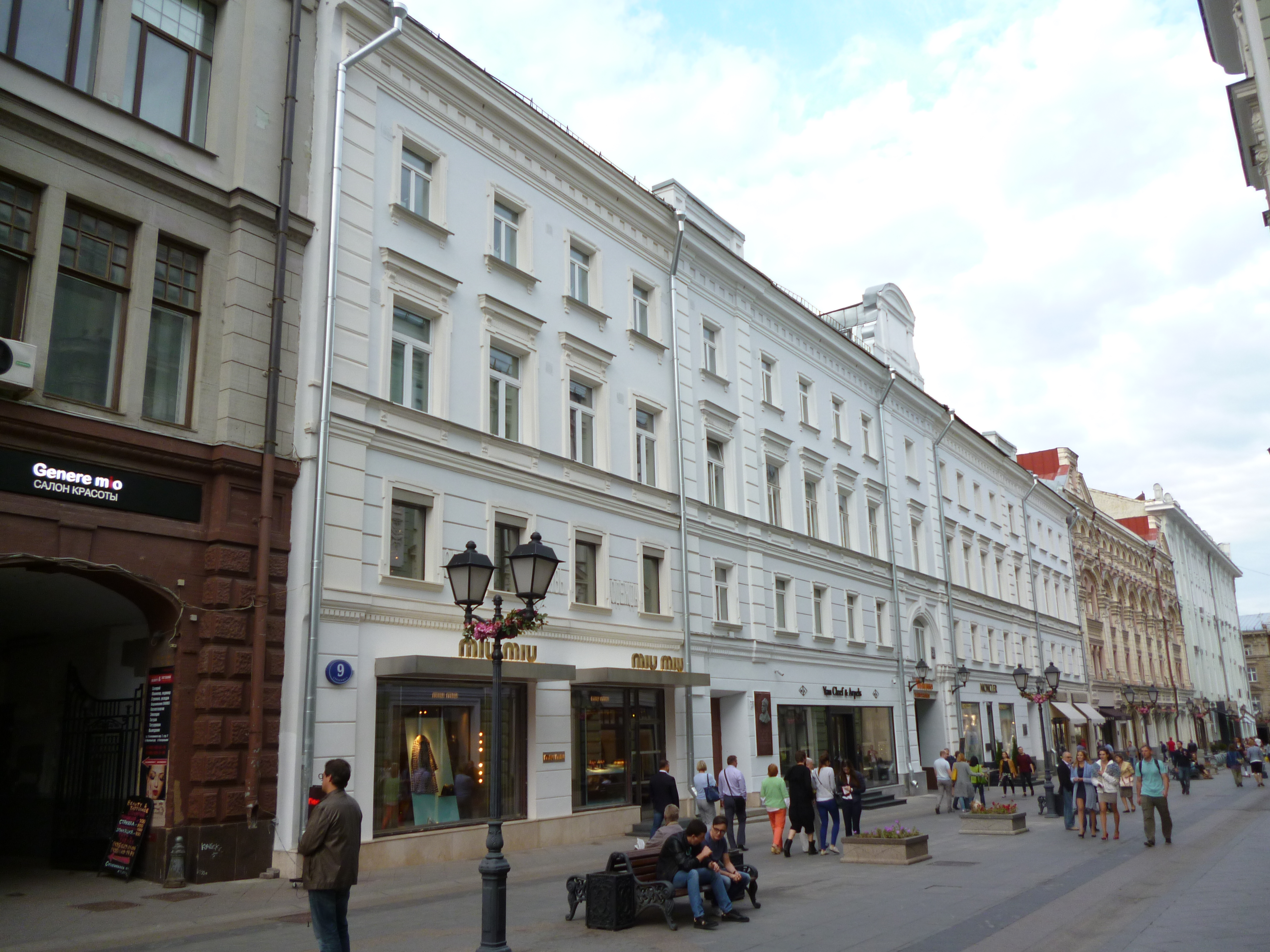
- Location: Moscow, Stoleshnikov Lane, Building 9, Building 1
- Coordinates: 55°45′47″N 37°36′54″E

The I.I. Karzinkin House (Russian: Доходный дом И. И. Карзинкина) is a historical building in Moscow (Stoleshnikov Lane, Building 9, Building 1). The apartment house was built in 1874 by the architect Vasily Karneyev in the eclectic style. Writer Vladimir Gilyarovsky lived in the house. The building has the status of an object of cultural heritage of federal significance.

== History and description ==
No. 9 Stoleshnikov Lane consists of several buildings. The oldest of them now stands in the courtyard (house 9, building 3), it is marked on the plan of the 18th century. At the beginning of the 19th century, the building on Stoleshnikov Lane was acquired by the French ballet choreographer Jean Lamiral. Before returning to France, Lamiral sold the town estate to P. P. Gagarin. In the 1870s the property belonged to the wine merchant Yegor Lyova. He divided possession into two parts, retaining for himself house 7. House 9 was sold to D. Nikiforov. The next owner was Ivan Ivanovich Karzinkin, a hereditary honorary citizen, co-owner and board member of the Balashinsky paper mill. When it was in 1874, the house was rebuilt to the design of architect Vasily Karneyev.

From 1886 to 1935 Russian writer, journalist and Moscow by-product writer Vladimir Gilyarovsky lived in apartment 10. He was visited by Anton Chekhov, Aleksandr Kuprin, Ivan Bunin, Nikolai Teleshov, Isaac Levitan, Feodor Chaliapin and other cultural figures. A memorial plaque is installed on the front of the house in memory of Gilyarovsky. Art critic Viktor Lobanov also lived in the house.

The last owners of the house before the revolution were merchants, hereditary honorable citizens of Titov. In the Soviet era, the former apartment house was a communal apartment. In the apartment of Gilyarovsky his descendants lived, who preserved the furnishings and details of the interior. At the beginning of the 21st century the house remained residential.
