= Dmitry Leshchenko =

Russian revolutionary, Old Bolshevik and professor

Dmitry Ilyich Leshchenko (Russian: Дми́трий Ильи́ч Лéщенко; 25 October 1876, Nikolaev, Kherson province – 9 November 1937, Leningrad) was a Russian revolutionary, Old Bolshevik, professor and one of the founders and first organizers of Soviet Cinema who served as first head of the All-Russian Photo and Cinematographic Department of the People's Commissariat for Education.

== Life and career ==
Born into a working-class family of an artisan, he became a student at the St. Petersburg University and joined the Russian Social Democratic Labour Party in his student years in 1900. He graduated from the university in 1902.

During the 1905 Russian Revolution, he was a member of the "chemical group" created in December 1905 under the Central Committee of the RSDLP. He was entrusted with the serial production of bombs.

During this period, he was also the permanent secretary of the Bolshevik newspapers Volna, Vperyod, Echo, published in St. Petersburg, and worked with Vladimir Lenin on most days. Leshchenko's three-room apartment was used for meetings among fellow party members. Lenin, Krupskaya, Anatoly Lunacharsky, Vatslav Vorovsky and others were visitors. Later he helped to create new safe houses, also acted as an agitator for the Central Committee. He was a delegate of the Fifth Congress of the RSDLP.

During the First World War, Leshchenko firmly defended the Leninist slogan of turning the imperialist war into a civil war, and resolutely fought against defencism. He was active participant in the February Revolution and served as the secretary of the editorial board Izvestia of the Petrograd Soviet of Workers 'and Soldiers' Deputies. In 1917 he worked with Krupskaya in the Vyborg District Duma as the secretary of the cultural and educational commission.

In 1917 he photographed Lenin in Razliv for a secret passport in the name of K.P Ivanov, a worker of a Sestroretsk plant.

After the October Revolution, from November 1917 to 1920 he served as Secretary of the State Commission on Education and Secretary of the RSFSR People's Commissariat for Education.

In 1918 he headed the Petrograd Film Committee, in December 1918 - the Central Film Committee in Moscow. He was the founder and professor of the Higher Institute of Photography and Photographic Technology. He played the role of a professor in one of the first Soviet feature films Cohabitation.

From 1919 to 1921 he was the head of the All-Russian photographic and cinematographic department of the People 's Commissariat for Education of the RSFSR, the first organization for the management of cinematography within the entire RSFSR. He participated in the organization of the 1st State School of Cinematography (now Gerasimov Institute of Cinematography).

In January 1922, he was appointed head of the Petrograd District Photographic and Film Department of POFKO, on the basis of which a new film organization was established on 9 May 1922, the Sevzapkino (North-West Cinema and Photo Administration) which was later renamed to Lenifilm. He headed Sevzapkino until 1923. In March 1923 he became a member of the Artistic Council Goskino.

From 19231929 he was elected a member of the Petrograd and then Leningrad City Council. From 1924 to 1929 he was the director of the Leningrad State Photo-Cinema School.

From 1923 to 1937 he worked as the head of the department of inorganic chemistry at the Leningrad Agricultural Institute.

Leshchenko died on 9 November 1937 in Leningrad after suffering an illness.
