= Conrad Laar =

German chemist (1853–1929)

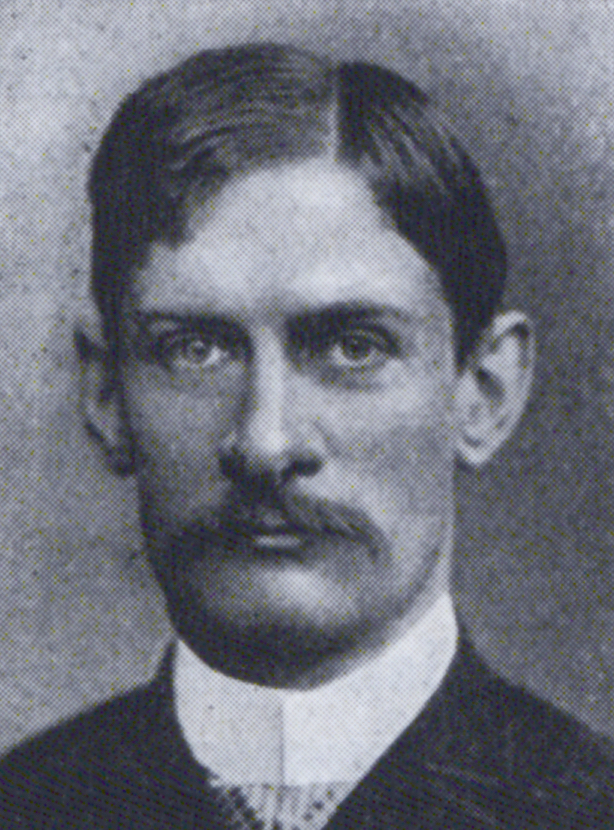
- Born: 22 March 1853; Hamburg, Germany
- Died: 11 February 1929 (aged 75); Bonn Germany
- Known for: coining the expression tautomerism
- Awards: Nobel prize
- Scientific career
- Workplaces: Universität Bonn

Conrad Peter Laar (22 March 1853 – 11 February 1929) was a German chemist. He coined the term tautomerism in 1885. He also observed the double bond rule in 1885, which would later be formally postulated by Otto Schmidt.
