= Cohabitation (disambiguation) =

Cohabitation is an arrangement where people who are not legally married live together as a couple.

Cohabitation may also refer to:

- Cohabitation (film), a 1918 Soviet silent film
- Cohabitation (Hong Kong film)
- Cohabitation (government), a situation in governmental politics
