= Schmidt double bond rule =

The double bond rule, postulated by Otto Schmidt in 1932, relates to the enhanced reactivity of sigma bonds attached to an atom adjacent to a double bond. Examples of this phenomenon include the difference in reactivity of allyl bromides as compared to bromoalkenes and benzyl bromides are compared to bromobenzenes. The first to observe the phenomenon was Conrad Laar in 1885.
