= Ministry of Meat and Dairy Industry =

Government ministry of the Soviet Union

The Ministry of Meat and Dairy Industry (Minmyasomolprom; Russian: Министерство мясной и молочной промышленности) was a government ministry in the Soviet Union.

== History ==
The People's Commissariat of Meat and Dairy Industry USSR was established as a union-republic people's commissariat by ukase of the Presidium of the Supreme Soviet USSR, dated 19 January 1939, which provided for the division of the People's Commissariat of Food Industry USSR into people's commissariats of food, fish, and meat and dairy industries.

The following economic organizations were transferred to the jurisdiction of the new People's Commissariat of Meat and Dairy Industry USSR: meat combines, slaughterhouses, refrigeration plants, sausage enterprises, poultry and egg industry enterprises, including procurement units, milk, cheese, and canned milk enterprises, ice cream enterprises, fodder-processing plants, swine sovkhozes formerly under the jurisdiction of the People's Commissariat of Food Industry USSR, and livestock-procurement units.

On 15 March 1946, the People's Commissariat of Meat and Dairy Industry USSR became the Ministry of Meat and Dairy Industry USSR.

The Ministry was abolished in November 1985 with the creation of the State Agro-Industrial Committee, which took over the functions of the Ministry for Agriculture, the Ministry for Fruit and Vegetable Production, the Ministry for the Meat and Dairy Industry, the Ministry of the Food Industry and the Ministry for Rural Construction.

== List of ministers ==
- Pavel Smirnov (19.1.1939 - 22.8.1946)
- Ivan Kuzminykh (22.8.1946 - 25.3.1953)
- Sergei Antonov (17.4.1954 - 12.1.1984)
- Jevgeni Sizenko (12.1.1984 - 22.11.1985)
