= Foreign Literature Committee =

Regulated distribution of foreign literature in the Soviet Union

Foreign Literature Committee (Russian: Комитет иностранной литературы), or Kominolit (Russian: Коминолит), was an interdepartmental committee under the People's Commissariat for Education for the purchase and distribution of foreign literature in Soviet Russia. Its chairman as of October 1921 was Otto Yulyevich Schmidt.
