= Fourth All Russian Conference of Trade Unions =

The Fourth All Russian Conference of Trade Unions took place 12–17 March 1918.

The Bolshevik, Mikhail Tomsky, proposed the resolution concerning the Relations between the Trade Unions and the Commissariat for Labour which stated that the October revolution had changed "the meaning and character of state organs and significance of proletarian organs as well". It was elaborated that previously the old ministry of Labour had acted as arbitrator between Labour and Capital, whereas the new Commissariat was the champion of the economic policy of the working class. Paragraph 9 of this resolution, which was adopted, removed labour relations from the purview of the soviets to that of the Commissariat for Labour, which was controlled by the Bolshevik Alexander Shlyapnikov

== Bibliography ==
- Kaplan, Frederick (1968). Bolshevik Ideology and the Ethics of Soviet labor. Philosophical library, New York.
