= Ivan Kairov =

Soviet educator (1893–1978)

Ivan Andreevich Kairov (Russian: Иван Андреевич Каиров; 26 December 1893 – 29 October 1978) was a Soviet educator who served as Russian Minister of Education from 1949 to 1956.

== Biography ==
Kairov was born in to the family of a state bank official and teacher. In 1917 he graduated from the Faculty of Physics and Mathematics of Moscow University and in the same year he joined the RSDLP (b).

From 1925 to 1929 he headed the department of agricultural education at the Glavprofobr under the People's Commissariat of Education of the RSFSR. From 1929 to 1948 he headed the departments of pedagogy in a number of Moscow universities. In 1930–1934 he worked as deputy director of the Scientific Research Institute of Agricultural Personnel, and from 1942 to 1950 he was editor-in-chief of the journal "Soviet Pedagogy".

From 1944 he was Kairov was full member of the Academy of Pedagogical Sciences of the RSFSR, from 1944 to 1946 he was its vice-president, and from 1946 to 1967 he served as president.

At the same time, from July 15, 1949, to March 28, 1956, Kairov was the Minister of Education of the Russian SFSR.

He was a Candidate member of the Central Committee of the CPSU from 1952 to 1956 and from 1961 to 1966. He elected Member of the Central Audit Commission of the CPSU in 1956–1961. He was deputy of the Supreme Soviet of the Soviet Union from 1950 to 1960.

By decree of the Presidium of the Supreme Soviet of the Soviet Union on 26 December 1963, for his great merits in the field of public education, active social and political activity, and in connection with the seventieth anniversary of his birth, Kairov was awarded the title of Hero of Socialist Labor with the awarding of the Order of Lenin.

From August 1966 to April 1974, he was the scientific head of the laboratory of the Research Institute of General Professional Education of the Academy of Pedagogical Sciences. From 1967 to 1971, he was a member of the Presidium of the Academy of Pedagogical Sciences.

Kairov retired in 1974. He died in Moscow and was buried at the Novodevichy Cemetery.

During his life he wrote and participated in the preparation of a number of textbooks on pedagogy for pedagogical institutes and universities.
