= Cohabitation (film) =

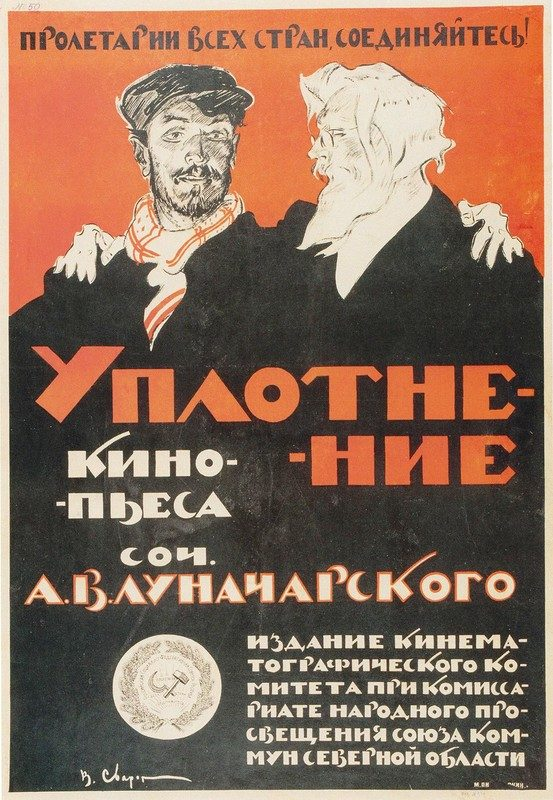
- Russian: Уплотнение
- Directed by: Anatoli Dolinov; Aleksandr Panteleyev; Donat Pashkovsky
- Written by: Anatoli Lunacharsky; Aleksandr Panteleyev
- Starring: Ivan Lersky; Dmitry Leshchenko
- Release date: 1918
- Running time: 56 minute
- Country: Russian Empire
- Language: Russian

Cohabitation (Russian: Уплотнение, romanized: Uplotneniye, lit. 'Compaction') is a 1918 agitprop silent full feature film directed by Anatoli Dolinov, Donat Pashkovsky and Aleksandr Panteleyev. It was produced by the Petrograd Cinema Committee (Note: ПОФКО (Петроградский окружной фото-кино-комитет); other sources name it Петроградский кинокомитет при Наркомпросе) and scripted by Anatoli Lunacharsky, People's Commissar of Education.

== Plot ==
A locksmith with his daughter were added to live in the apartment of a professor, as a matter of "compaction" (see Communal apartment § History) . The apartment is then visited by various factory workers and the professor decides to start lecturing in the working club. The younger son falls in love with the worker's daughter and they decide to get married. The elder son of the professor, a yunker student, dislikes the new tenants of the apartment. In the end of the film he is arrested.

== Starring ==
- Ivan Lersky as locksmith Pulnikov
- Dmitry Leshchenko as professor Khrustin
- Anatoli Lunacharsky, cameo appearance
