= Otto Schmidt (ship) =

Soviet icebreaking research vessel

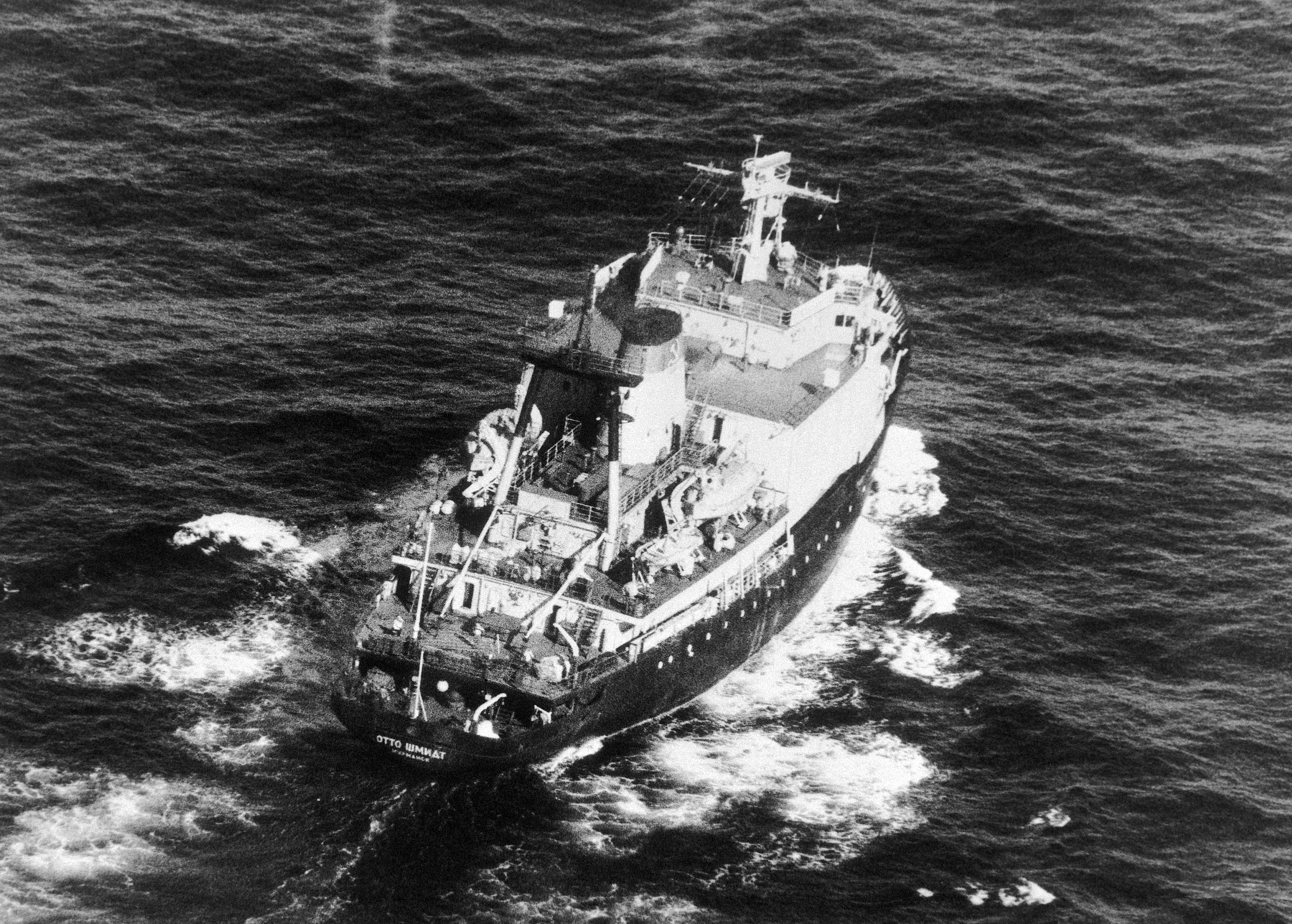

History

→ Soviet Union → Russia
- Name: Otto Schmidt (Отто Шмидт)
- Namesake: Otto Schmidt
- Port of registry: Murmansk, Soviet Union → Russia
- Builder: Admiralty Shipyard (Leningrad, USSR)
- Yard number: 02783
- Laid down: 27 December 1977
- Launched: 27 December 1978
- Completed: 30 August 1979
- In service: 1979–1991
- Identification: IMO number: 7828671
- Fate: Broken up in 1996

General characteristics (Project 97N)
- Type: Research vessel
- Displacement: 3,700 t (3,600 long tons)
- Length: 73 m (240 ft)
- Beam: 18.6 m (61 ft)
- Draught: 6.6 m (22 ft)
- Installed power: 3 × 13D100 (3 × 1,800 hp)
- Propulsion: Diesel–electric; two shafts (2 × 2,400 hp)
- Speed: 15 knots (28 km/h; 17 mph) (maximum)
- Range: 11,000 nautical miles (20,000 km; 13,000 mi) at economic speed
- Endurance: 55 days
- Crew: 54 crew; 30 scientists

Otto Schmidt (Russian: Отто Шмидт) was a Soviet and later Russian icebreaking research ship in service from 1979 until 1991.

== Description ==
In the mid-1950s, the Soviet Union began developing a new diesel-electric icebreaker design based on the 1942-built steam-powered icebreaker Eisbär to meet the needs of both civilian and naval operators. Built in various configurations until the early 1980s, the Project 97 icebreakers and their derivatives became the largest and longest-running class of icebreakers and icebreaking vessels built in the world. The single-vessel subclass Project 97N (Russian: 97Н) was a research vessel commissioned by the Main Directorate of the Hydrometeorological Service under the Council of Ministers of the Soviet Union (Note: State Committee for Hydrometeorology and Control of Natural Environment of the Soviet Union since 1978.) to conduct scientific research in the poorly-studied transition zone between open water and the polar ice pack.

Slightly larger than the port icebreakers on which it was based, Project 97N was 73 metres (240 ft) long overall and had a beam of 18.6 metres (61 ft). Fully laden, the ship drew 6.6 metres (22 ft) of water and had a displacement of 3,700 tonnes (3,600 long tons). Special attention was paid to improving the seaworthiness of the vessel which was studied with model tests prior to construction. The problematic rolling behavior of the rounded icebreaking hull form was addressed by increasing the rolling period from 7 to 9–10 seconds with design modifications and introducing a passive roll damping tank. In addition, the bow was given more pronounced sheer and flare to reduce the likelihood of waves breaking over it in heavy seas.

Like all Project 97 variants, Otto Schmidt had a diesel-electric power plant consisting of three 1,800-horsepower (1,300 kW) 10-cylinder 13D100 two-stroke opposed-piston main diesel engines coupled to double-armature direct current (DC) generators. They provided power to 2,400 hp (1,800 kW) electric propulsion motors driving two 3.5-metre (11 ft) four-bladed fixed pitch propellers. This gave the ship ability to break 60-centimetre (24 in) ice at a speed of about 2 knots (3.7 km/h; 2.3 mph). In addition, the ship had five ship service diesel generators, two auxiliary steam boilers, and an emergency diesel generator.

Otto Schmidt had extensive scientific outfit: multiple laboratories, oceanographic winches, and an 80-centimetre (31 in) moon pool for deploying scientific equipment into the sea when the vessel was surrounded by ice. The vessel could accommodate up to 30 scientists for up to 55 days in addition to a crew of 54.

== History ==
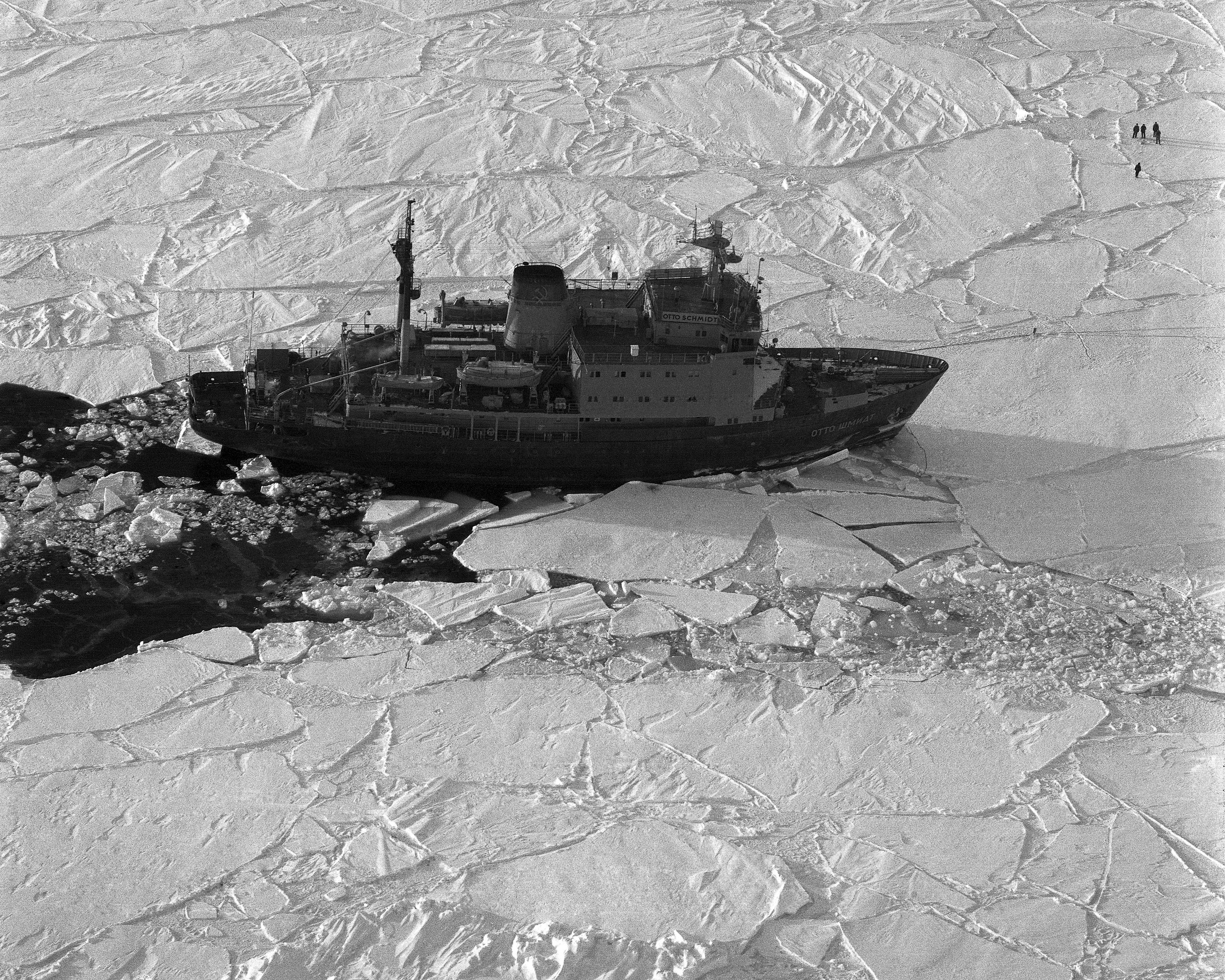
Otto Schmidt with personnel on ice on 7 November 1988

Otto Schmidt was laid down at Admiralty Shipyard in Leningrad on 27 December 1977, launched exactly one year later on 27 December 1978, and delivered on 30 August 1979. The vessel was named after the Soviet scientist and Arctic explorer Otto Yulyevich Shmidt (1891–1956).

During its 12-year career, Otto Schmidt completed 40 scientific expeditions in the Arctic seas. These included a 40-day drifting expedition within the polar ice pack in the Greenland Sea to continue the work of the drifting ice station North Pole-28 that had been evacuated by the nuclear-powered icebreaker Rossiya.

After completing its final voyage on 11 November 1991, shortly before the dissolution of the Soviet Union, Otto Schmidt was laid up in Murmansk due to lack of funding for required maintenance and repairs. The ship was later sold to a private company, left Murmansk on 8 August 1996 under its own power, and was beached for scrapping in Alang, India, in September of the same year.
