= Stoleshnikov Lane =

Street in central Moscow, Russia

Coordinates: 55°45′45″N 37°36′49″E

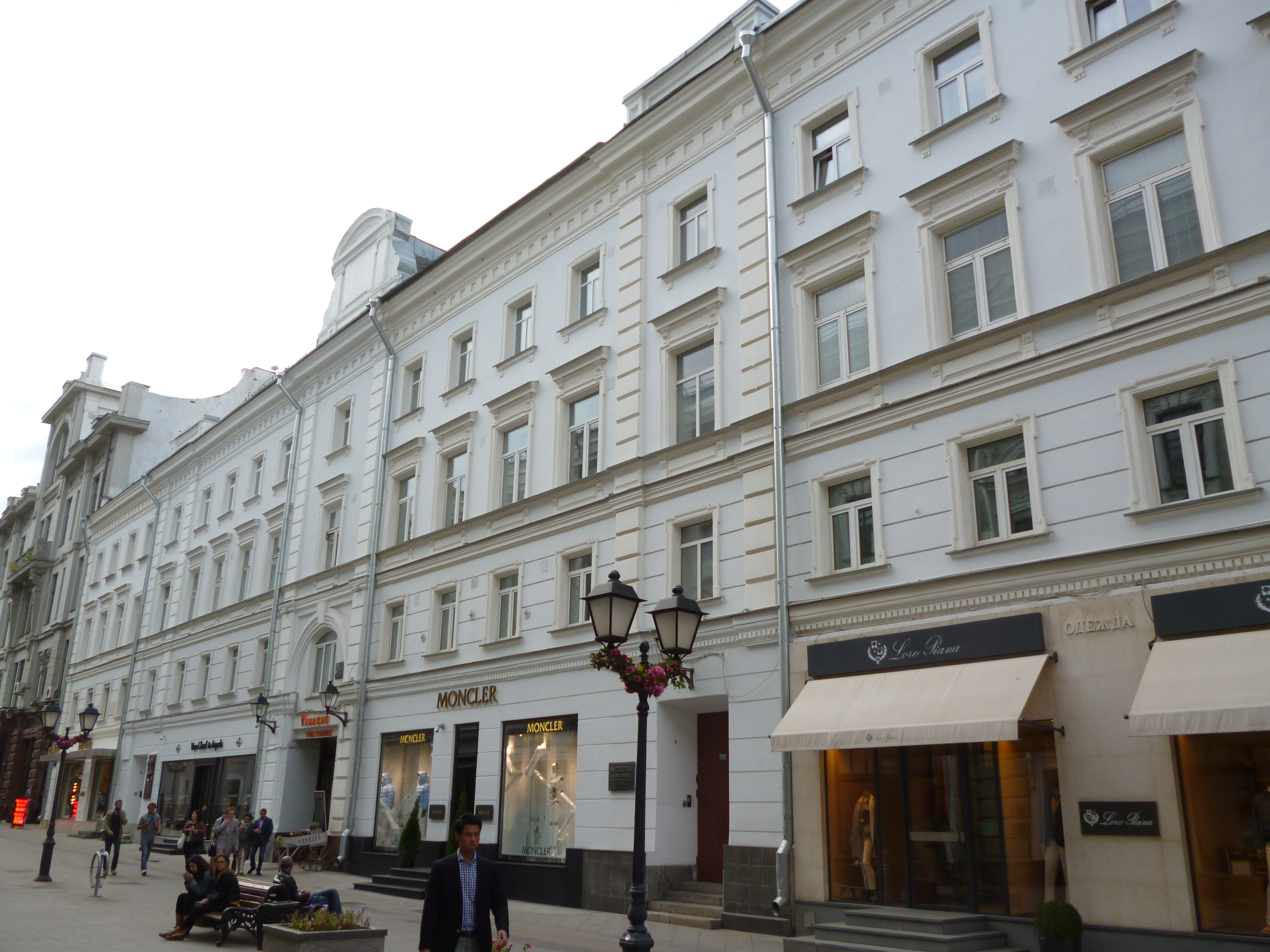
- Native name: Столешников переулок (Russian)
- Location: Moscow; Central Administrative Okrug; Tverskoy District
- Nearest metro station: Okhotny Ryad; Teatralnaya; Tverskaya; Pushkinskaya

Stoleshnikov Pereulok or Stoleshnikov Lane (Russian: Столешников переулок) is a short street with boutiques and shops with many luxury goods located within the Boulevard Ring in central Moscow and known as one of the most expensive shopping areas in the world.

The street runs from Tverskaya Street in the west, to Petrovka Street in the east. The I. I. Karzinkin House is a historical building on the street.

== Gallery ==
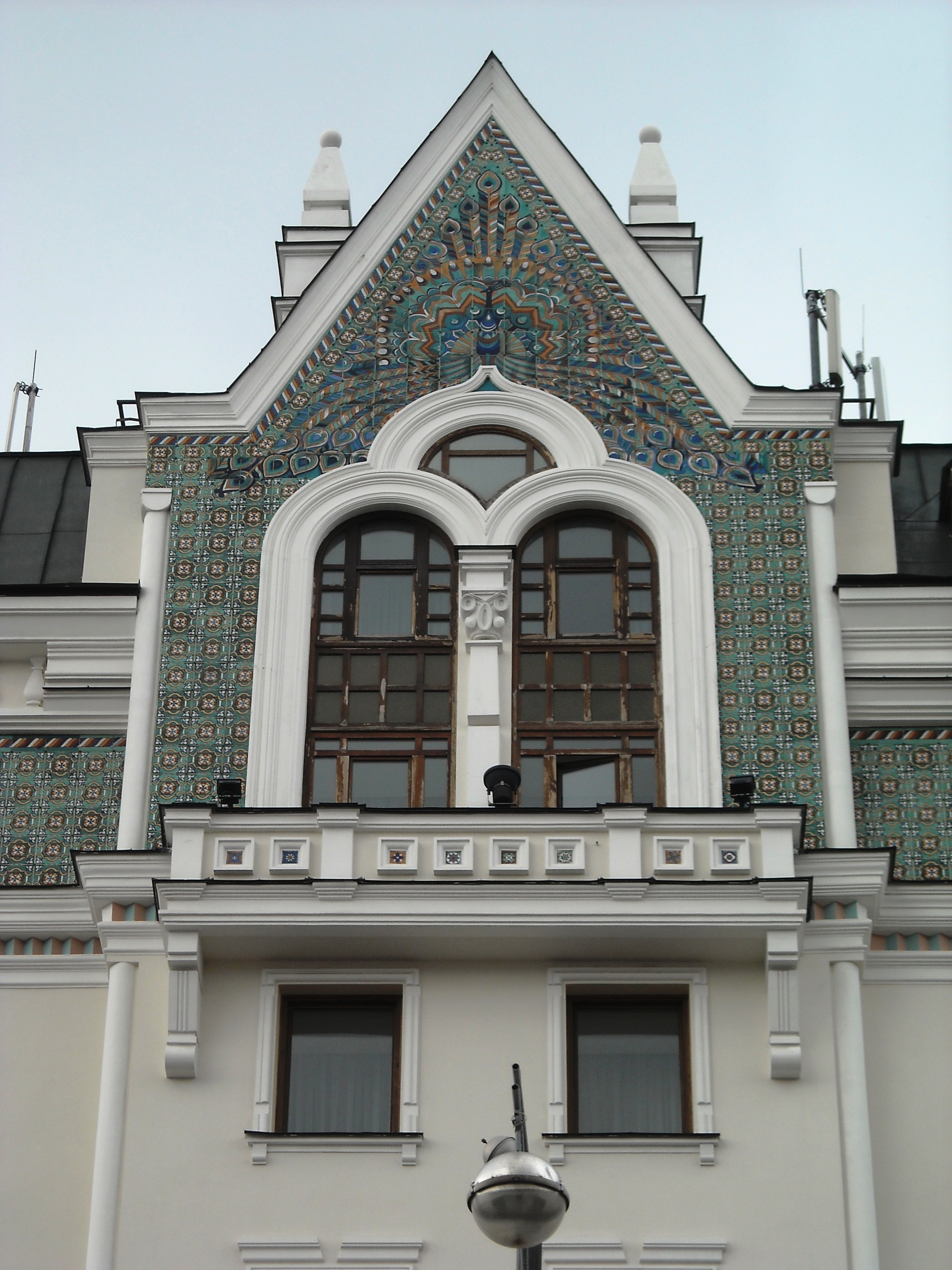
Hotel Aurora

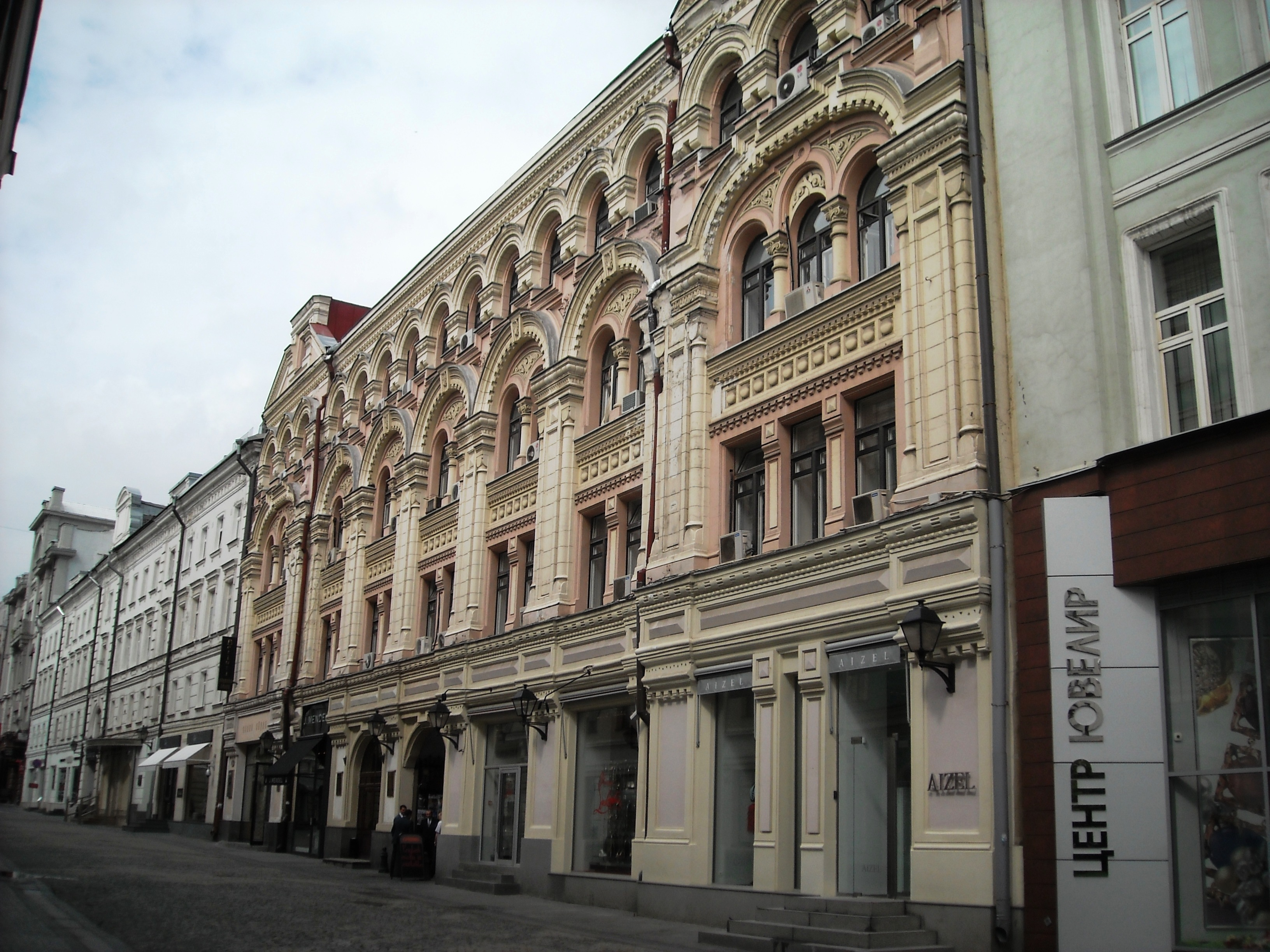

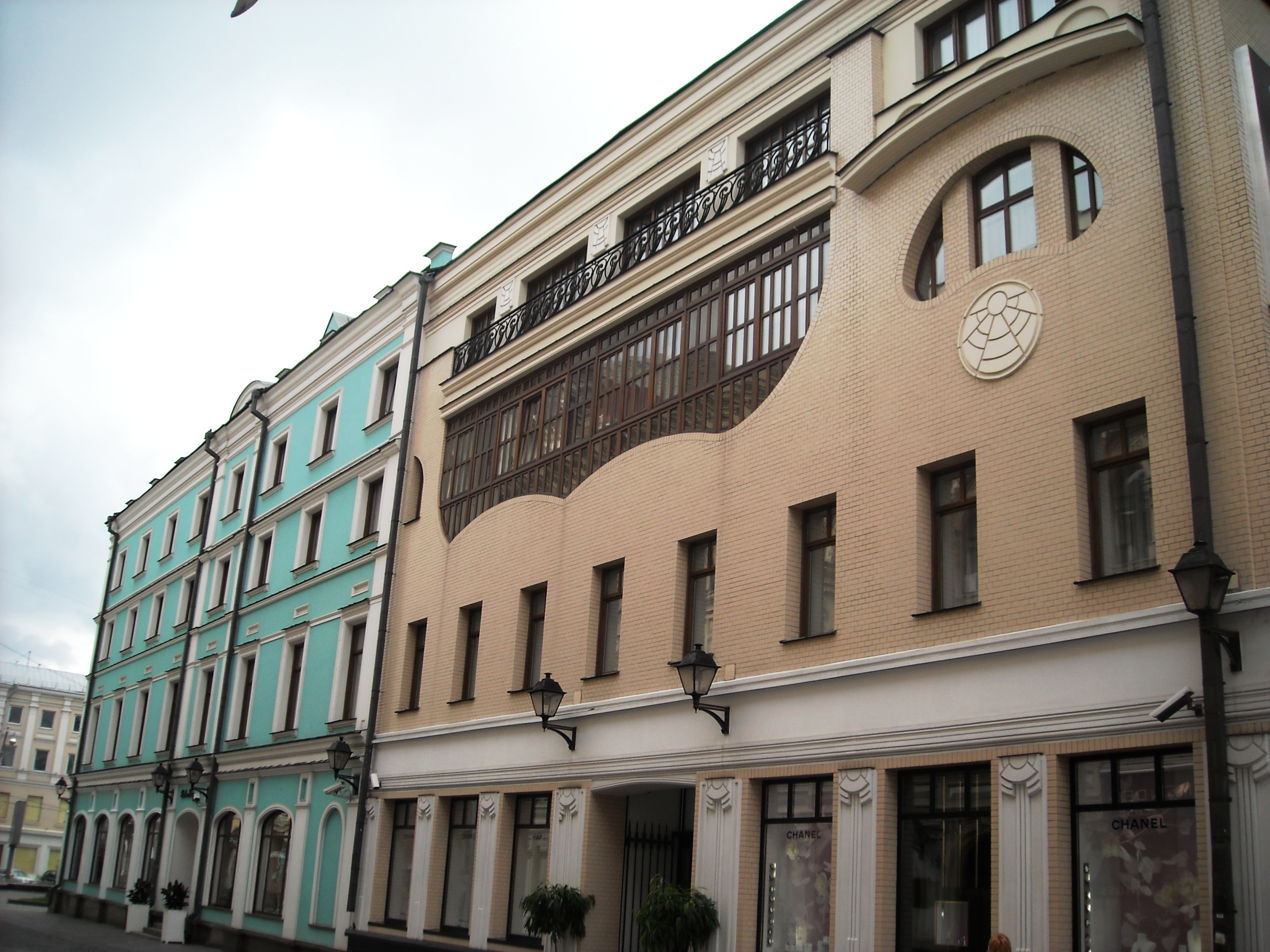

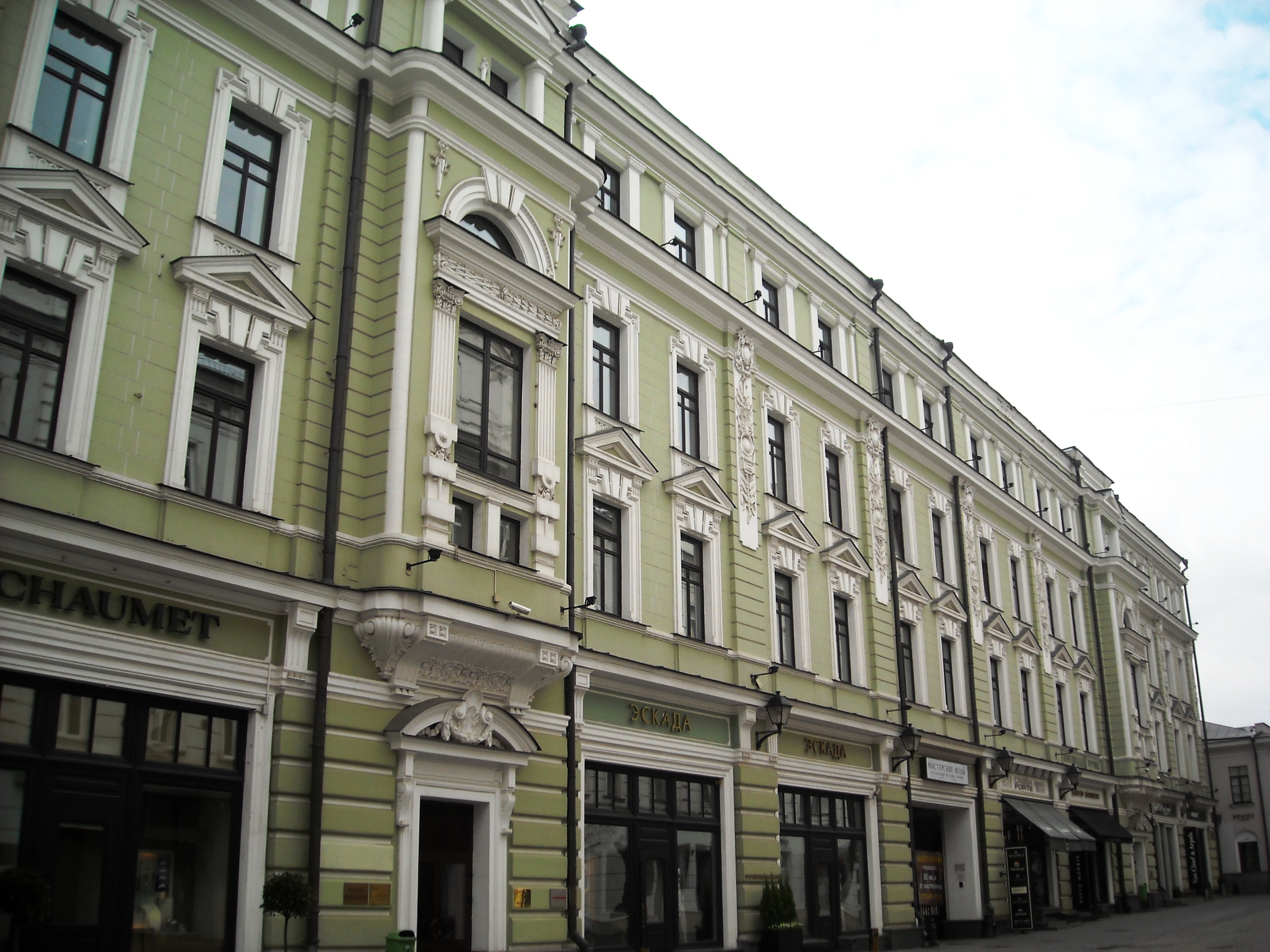

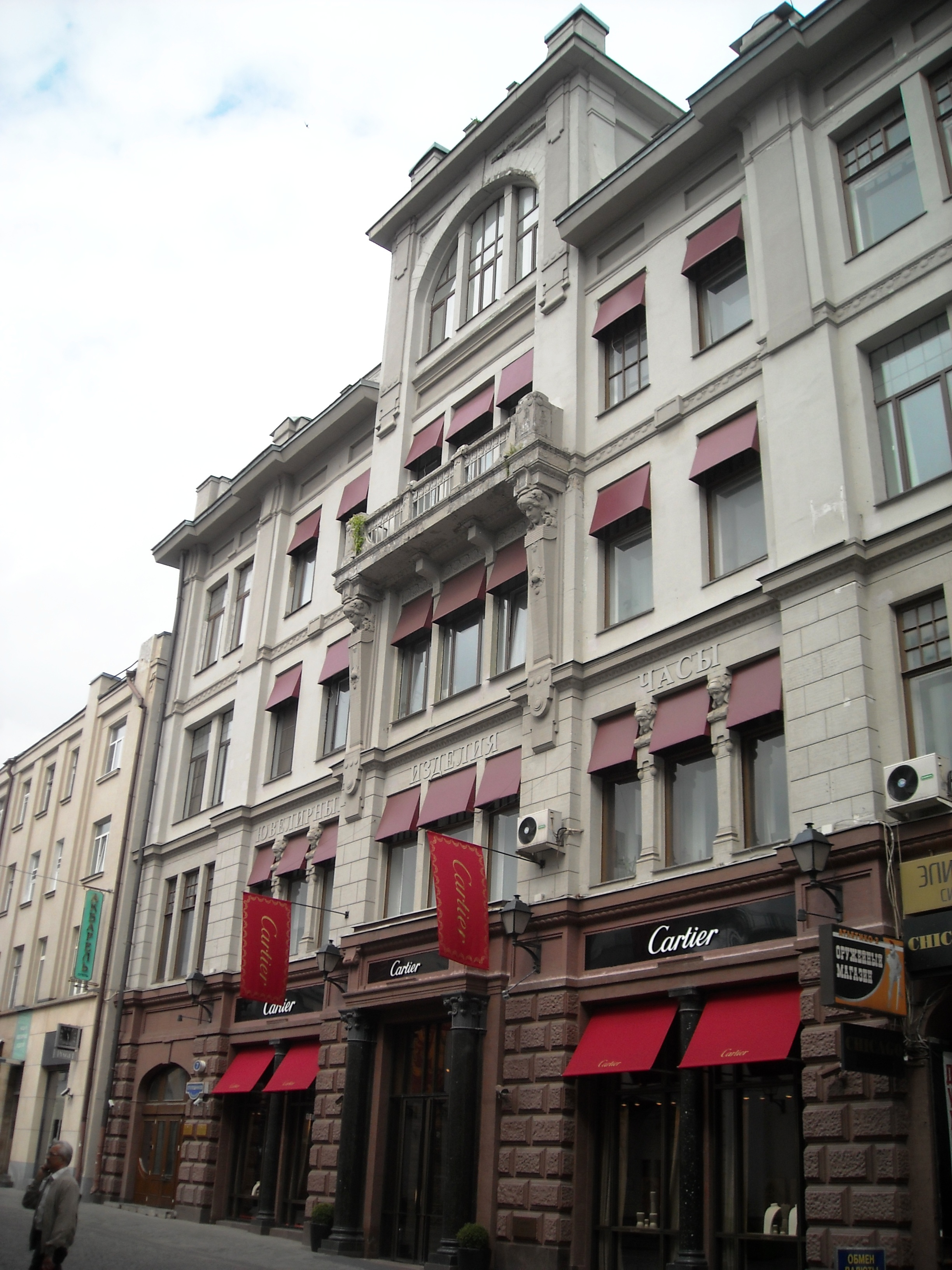
no° 7, 1903, designed by Adolf Erichson
