= Evgraf Litkens =

Russian Bolshevik and civil servant (1888–1922)

Evgraf Alexandrovich Litkens (Russian: Евграф Александрович Литкенc; 1888–1922) was a Russian Bolshevik who played a major role in the development of Narkompros following the Bolshevik seizure of power.

As a young boy Evgraf Litkens met Lev Trotsky, when his father harboured Trotsky following the defeat of the 1905 Revolution. He subsequently graduated from the University of St Petersburg.

== The Litkens Commission ==
In 1917 he was given a mandate from the Central Committee of the Russian Communist Party to reorganise Narkompros, making it a more efficient organisation. This was only completed in late 1920. He proposed splitting Narkompros into an Academic Centre, dealing with policy, and an Organisational Centre, dealing with the administration of the ministry. Whilst the Commissar, Anatoly Lunacharsky would maintain overall supervision and head the Academic Centre, an additional Assistant Commissar, i.e. Litkens, would run the Organisational Centre and have administrative control. The proposal was criticised by both Lenin and Krupskaya, but it was nevertheless implemented with some amendments by Sovnarkom in mid-February 1921.

Lunacharsky, as Commissar retained overall control, but the Academic Centre was to be headed by Mikhail Pokrovsky as an Assistant Commissar alongside Litkens heading the Organisational Centre. Whereas Litkens had proposed three departments within Narkompros, Glavsotsvos for school education, Glavprofobr for technical training and higher education and Glavpolitprosvet for political education, Sovnarkon introduced a fourth Gosizdat, the State Publishing House.

He was murdered by Crimean bandits in Yalta in 1922.
