= Tenement house with a wine shop =

- Доходный дом с винным магазином Леве
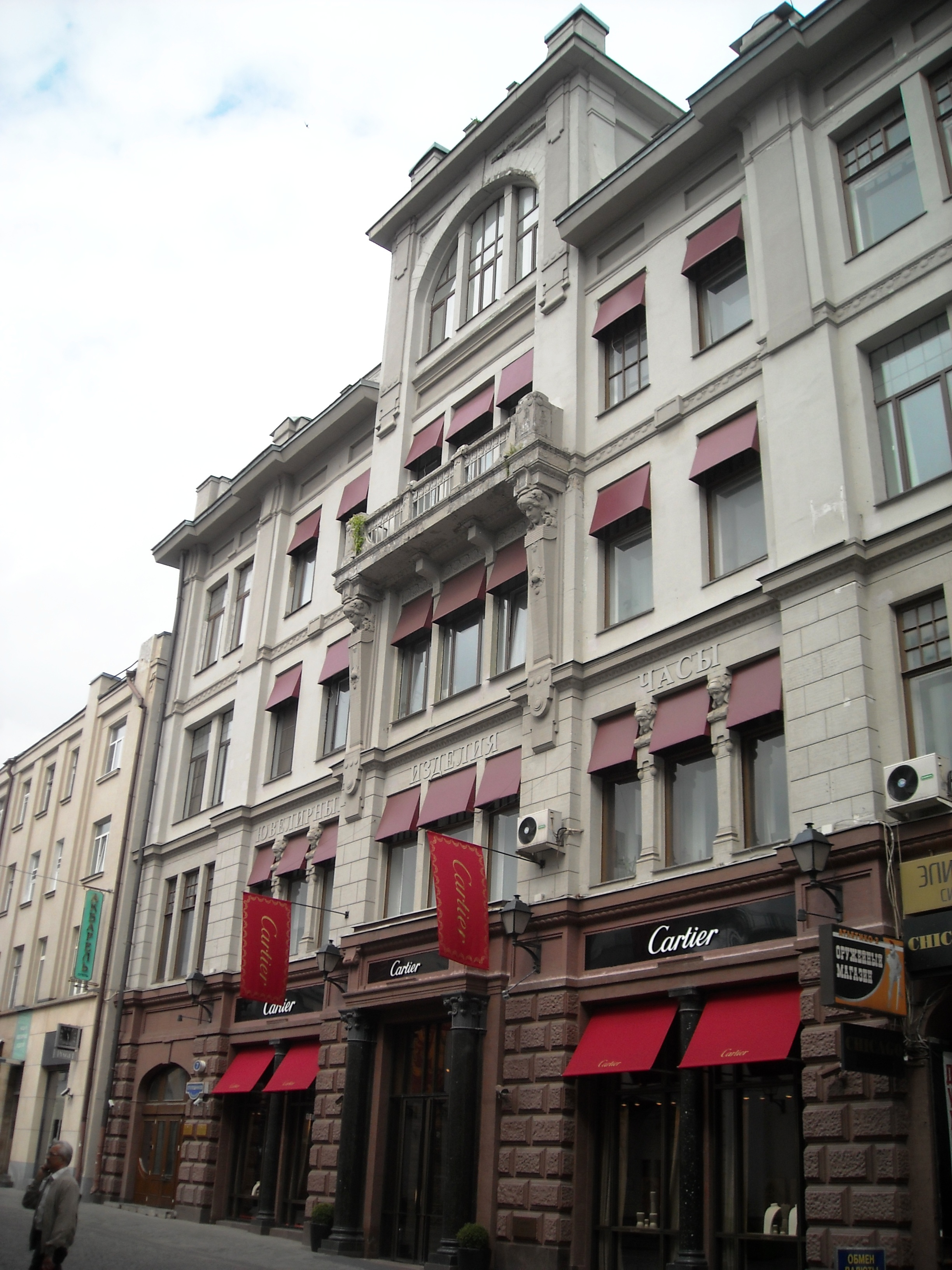
- Interactive map of Tenement house with a wine shop
- Location: Moscow, Stoleshnikov lane, house 7, building 1
- Coordinates: 55°45′47″N 37°36′52″E

The tenement house with a wine shop (Russian: Доходный дом с винным магазином) is a historical building in Moscow (Stoleshnikov lane, house 7, building 1). It was built in 1903 by architect A. Erichson in the Art Nouveau style. The building has the status of an object of cultural heritage of regional significance.

== History ==
Ownership in Stoleshnikov Lane, now occupied by houses 7 and 9, in the beginning of the 19th century was acquired by the famous French ballet and choreographer Jean Lamiral. Before returning to France, Lamiral sold the town estate to P. P. Gagarin. In the 1870s the property belonged to the wine merchant Yegor Lyova. He divided possession into two parts. The part now occupied by house 9, he sold to DI Nikiforov, and left the other part for himself. It housed his famous wine store, mentioned, including in the novel "Anna Karenina".

In 1903, the famous Moscow architect Adolf Erichson built a new house in the Art Nouveau style for the Leva family in place of the demolished old one. Its facade was richly trimmed with stone and bronze (horizontal thrusts, floral ornaments, bronze capitals). On the central wall there is a balcony. It is supported by female herms wrapped in grapevines, which indicated that they belonged to wine merchants. For the facing, several varieties of natural stone were used, differing in both color and texture: red polished granite in the base, black polished labradorite columns, red tufted tufa on the first floor wall, limestone on the second floor wall and on the balcony. Above the balcony in the raised part of the building is a large semi-circular window. In the upper parts of the windows, a small spreading is applied, which is a characteristic technique of Erichson.

The wine shop was located on the first floor. Before the revolution, he owned a hereditary honorary citizen Olga Petrovna Leve. In Soviet times it was Glavvino's department store of the Ministry of Food Industry of the USSR, later – the Fruit-Wine store. Now there is no wine store in the house anymore. Its upper floors are occupied by the Main Directorate of Architecture and Urban Planning of the Moscow Region.
