= Vestnik Teatra =

Russian theatre magazine

Vestnik Teatra (Theatre Courier) was the journal of the Theatre Department of Narkompros, founded in Moscow in 1919. It became an influential journal amongst theatrical practitioners during the period following the Bolshevik seizure of power. It published articles by such people as Platon Kerzhentsev and Vsevolod Meyerhold. The magazine ceased publication in 1921.

== Some articles ==
No. 1 (1919):

'Mozhno li iskazhat' p'esy postanovkoi?' (p. 2), Platon Kerzhentsev

No. 19 (1919):

'Rozn' iskusstva' (p. 2), Platon Kerzhentsev

No. 36 (1919):

'Peredelyvaite p'esy! (pp. 6–8), Platon Kerzhentsev

No. 48 (1920):

'Teatral'nyi muzei' (pp. 4–5), Platon Kerzhentsev

No. 51 (1920):

'Burzhuaznoe nasledie' (pp. 2–3), Platon Kerzhentsev

No. 53 (1920):

'Pis'mo v redaktsiiu' (p. 5), Platon Kerzhentsev

== See also ==
- Proletcult Theatre
