= People's Commissariat for Labour =

Soviet government ministry

The People's Commissariat for Labour (Russian: Народный комиссариат труда) was established by the Bolsheviks following their seizure of power during the October Revolution. It functioned as a ministry in the new government which was known as Council of the People's Commissars.

== People's Commissars for Labour ==
People's Commissar for Labour	Period in office
Alexander Shlyapnikov	8 November [O.S. 26 October] 1917 — 1 December 1918
Vasili Schmidt	1 December 1918 — 29 November 1928
Nikolai Uglanov	29 November 1928 — 1 July 1930
Anton Cikhon	1 July 1930 — 23 July 1933
Yevgeni Braziliya	23 July 1933 — 17 November 1935

Before the revolution, the tsarist regime had a Ministry of Labour which was replaced by the People's Commissariat for Labour. At the Fourth All Russian Conference of Trade Unions (12-17 March 1918) the Bolshevik Mikhail Tomsky proposed a resolution concerning the Relations between the Trade Unions and the Commissariat for Labour which stated that the October revolution had changed "the meaning and character of state organs and significance of proletarian organs as well". It was elaborated that previously the old ministry of Labour had acted as arbitrator between Labour and Capital, whereas the new Commissariat was the champion of the economic policy of the working class. Paragraph 9 of this resolution, which was adopted, removed labour relations from the purview of the Soviets to that of the Commissariat for Labour (Narkomtrud), which was directed by the Bolshevik Alexander Shlyapnikov.

Taking into consideration the rapidly evolving context of economic crisis and foreign invasion, Commissar Shlyapnikov sought to accord the People’s Commissariat for Labour the authority to make decisions and pass decrees. Previously, the Provisional Government’s Ministry of Labour mediated between the managers and workers, whereas the Narkomtrud promoted workers' welfare. It also took part in regulating industry in collaboration with trade unions. However, Narkomtrud faced many obstacles such as contending with the leaders of the non-Bolshevik unions, ambitious demands of the factory committees, and maintaining disciplinary order amongst the workers. Additionally, some Mensheviks, Socialist Revolutionaries and a few Bolsheviks were not in agreement with Shlyapnikov’s system. Shlyapnikov filled the key Narkomtrud positions with trade union staff because he believed that their knowledge regarding the regulations of wages and working conditions made them more qualified to carry out their duties.

When Narkomtrud was formed, its initial agenda was to address the questions regarding nationalization of the enterprises, the tariff, and increase in labour productivity. The leadership was committed to creating a system of workers’ control of industry under centralized coordination. Shylapnikov had tariffs applied to foreign imports to attract workers to the large nationalized enterprises from the smaller industries, which would lead to higher production volumes by concentrating the resources and labour in the large enterprises. However, due to rapid and sudden inflation, the tariffs became impractical and Narkomtrud was unable to implement them as the economy was collapsing. Shlyapnikov and union leaders proposed certain enforcements that would encourage the workers to work harder in order to reverse the economic decline. For example, revival of piece-rates was proposed as an incentive for workers that would also guarantee certain output. However, this was a controversial proposal due to its somewhat exploitative nature, which was considered incompatible with principles of socialism. In order to ensure the success of the workers' revolution, and survival of the industrial working class, it was necessary that workers not abandon industry for other professions and for this reason, Shlyapnikov requested from the Council of People's Commissars 30 million rubles to fund cafeterias, rations and work projects for the unemployed, and another 500,000 rubles to fund trade unions insurance committees, other workers' organisations and lastly to publish works on the 'question of workers' politics'.

== Bibliography ==
- Kaplan, Frederick (1968). Bolshevik Ideology and the Ethics of Soviet labor. Philosophical library, New York.
- Allen, Barbara C. and Brill Online Books. Alexander Shlyapnikov, 1885-1937: Life of an Old Bolshevik. Vol. 90. Leiden;Boston;: Brill, 2015.
