= Glavpolitprosvet =

Soviet State educational authority

The Main Political and Educational Committee of the People's Commissariat of Education of the Russian Socialist Federative Soviet Republic (Russian: Гла́вный поли́тико-просвети́тельный комите́т Наркомпроса РСФСР) was a state authority, which, as the Main Directorate, was part of the People's Commissariat of Education of the Russian Socialist Federative Soviet Republic.

== History ==
It was established by decree of the Council of People's Commissars on November 12, 1920 on the basis of the out-of-school department of the People's Commissariat of Education.

The task of the Main Political and Educational Committee was to guide political, educational and propaganda work in the spirit of the ideals of the Communist Party. The Main Political and Educational Committee was in charge of reading houses, clubs, libraries, adult schools, Soviet-party schools, communist universities and more.

The chairman of the Main Political and Educational Committee during the whole period of its work was Nadezhda Krupskaya.

In June 1930, the Main Political and Educational Committee was reorganized into the mass work sector of the People's Commissariat of Education of the Russian Socialist Federative Soviet Republic.

== Sources ==
- Glavpolitprosvet // Soviet Historical Encyclopedia
- Glavpolitprosvet // Gazlift – Gogolevo – Moscow: Soviet Encyclopedia, 1971 – (Great Soviet Encyclopedia: in 30 Volumes / Editor-in-Chief Alexander Prokhorov; 1969–1978, Volume 6)
- Nadezhda Krupskaya. On Cultural and Educational Work. Selected Articles and Speeches, Moscow, 1965
- Fedor Panachin. Glavpolitprosvet // Pedagogical Dictionary
