= Communal apartment =

Type of apartment in Soviet Union and Russia

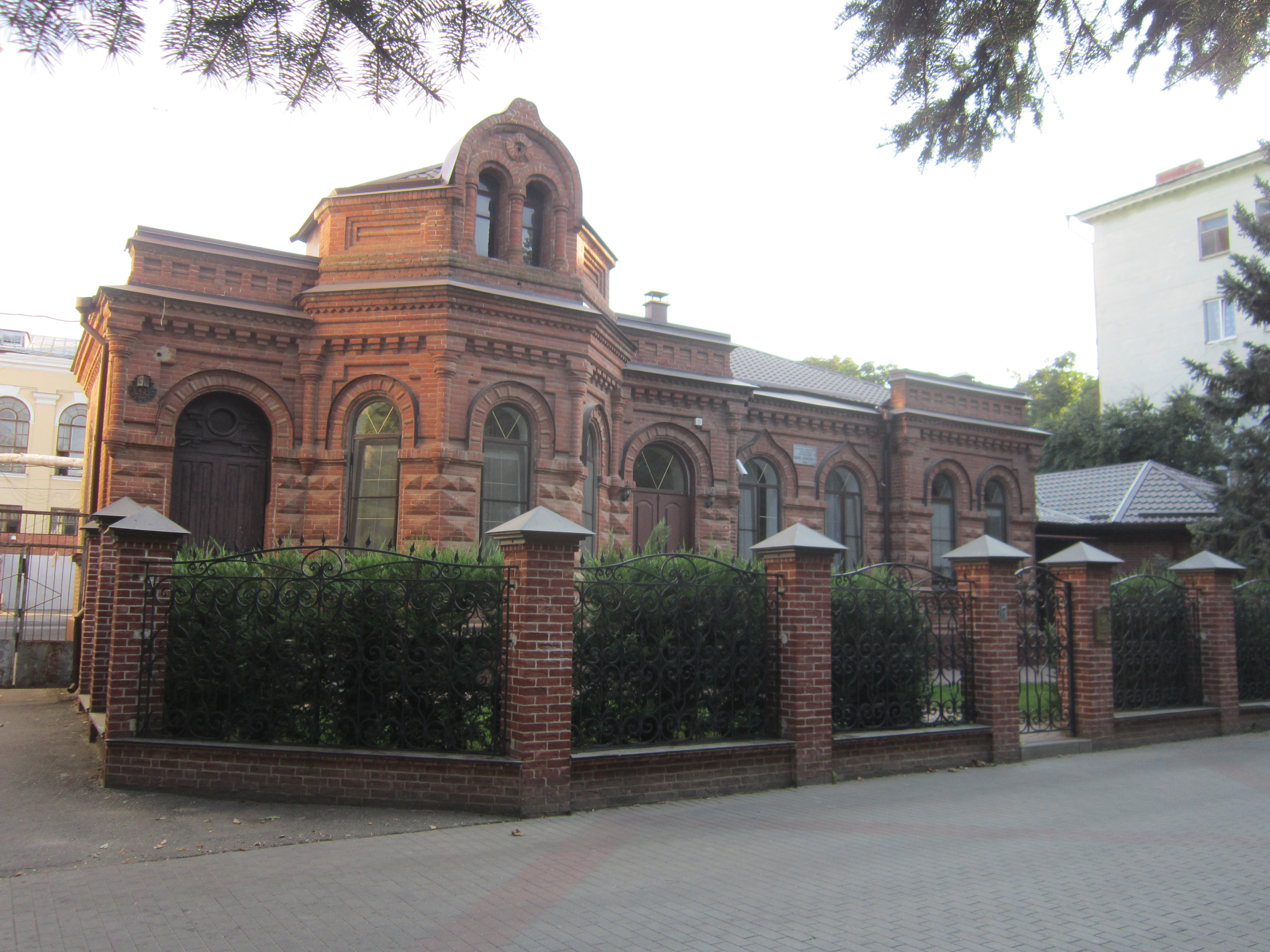
House Ekaterinodar attorney, notary Anton Yalovoy. In the Soviet years the mansion served as communal apartments.

Communal apartments (singular Russian: коммунальная квартира, romanized: kommunal'naya kvartira, colloquial: коммуналка, kommunalka) are apartments in which several unrelated persons or families live in isolated living rooms and share common areas such a kitchen, shower, and toilet. When the Bolsheviks came to power in 1917 after the October Revolution, to cope with the housing shortage, they nationalised luxurious apartment blocks from rich people to make them available to the proletariat.

The term communal apartments emerged specifically in the Soviet Union, kommunalkas became the predominant form of housing for generations. Communal apartments were supposed to be a temporary solution and were in fact phased out in many cities of the country. Due to the Second World War, large population influxes from the countryside and a lack of investment in new housing, kommunalkas still exist in some former Soviet cities, such as Saint Petersburg.

== History ==
The first communal apartments appeared in the early 18th century, when rental lodging was partitioned by the landlords into "corners", often walk-through tiny dwellings. From the mid-19th century the number of such apartments had drastically increased. Usually they consisted of units with three to six rooms. In the 20th century, the Soviet Union undertook "intensive industrialization and urbanization", shifting from eighty percent of the population living in rural villages and towns at the time of the Revolution, to nearly the same percentage living in cities by the 1990s. People were driven from the countryside by poverty and harsh collectivization, and pulled to the city by the industrialization of the economy. This exodus put enormous pressure on existing urban housing accommodations. Communal apartments were one answer to the housing crisis, and many considered them a step up from the alternatives of housing communes, hostels, and barracks.

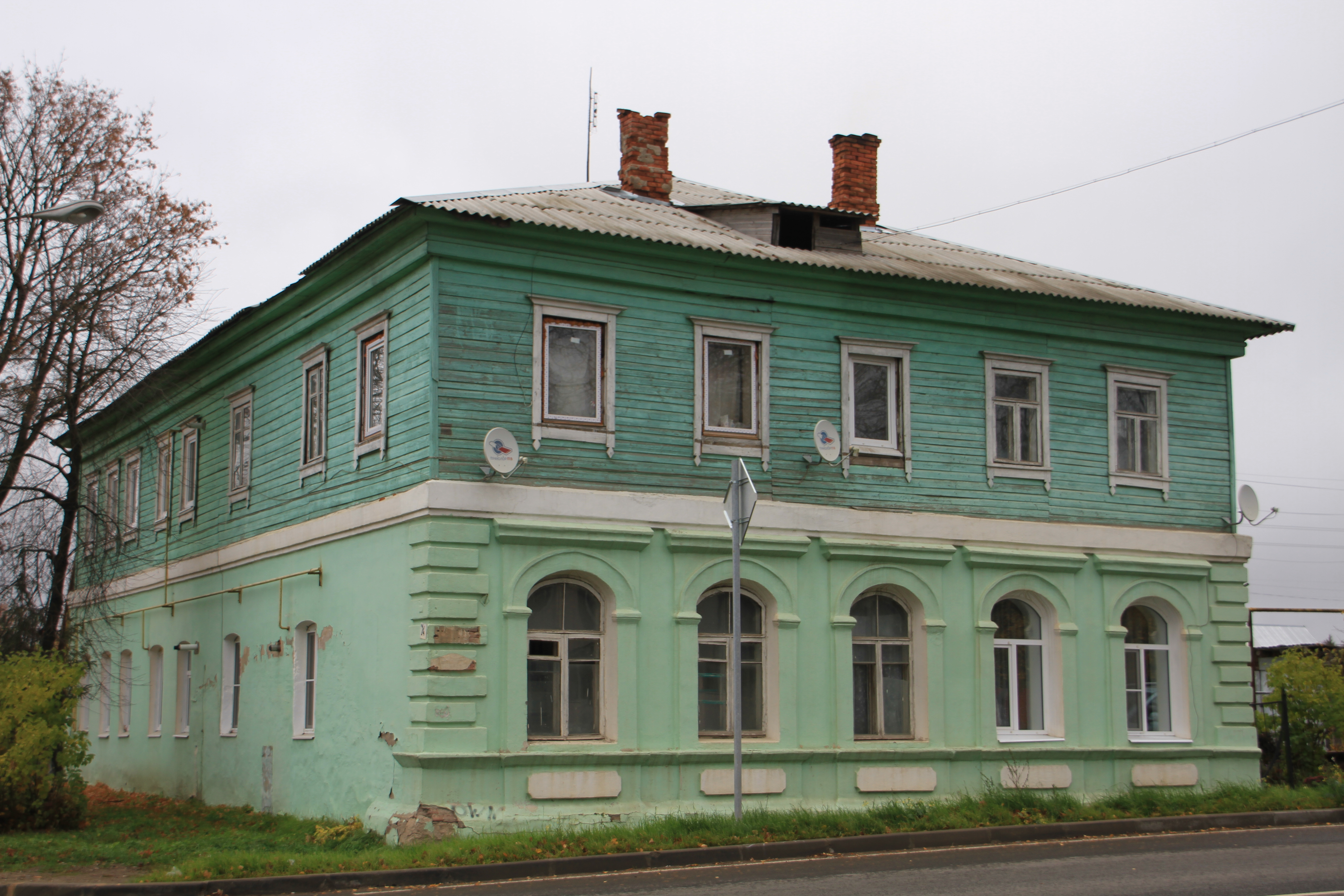
A manor in Medyn, Kaluga Oblast turned into several kommunalkas

Vladimir Lenin conceived the communal apartment and drafted a plan to "expropriate and resettle private apartments" shortly after the October Revolution. His plan inspired many architects to begin communal housing projects, to create a "revolutionary topography." The communal apartment was revolutionary by "uniting different social groups in one physical space." Furthermore, housing belonged to the government and families were allotted an extremely small number of square meters each. At these time a peculiar procedure was introduced called "compaction" ("Уплотнение"): housing norms were introduced, and if an apartment was "underpopulated", other people were assigned to live there.

After Stalin's death in 1953, Khrushchev's regime "embarked upon a mass housing campaign", to eliminate the persistent housing shortages, and create private apartments for urban residents. This campaign was a response to popular demand for "better living conditions, single-family housing, and greater privacy"; Khrushchev believed that granting the people private apartments would give them greater enthusiasm for the communist system in place and that improving people's attitudes and living conditions would lead to a healthier and more productive workforce. However, the new apartments were built quickly, with an emphasis on quantity over quality, and in underdeveloped neighborhoods, with poor systems of public transportation, making daily life harder for workers. These apartment blocks quickly became called "khrushchyoba", a cross between Khrushchev's name and the Russian term for slums.

Most communal apartments were replaced after the death of Joseph Stalin with Khrushchevkas, in which each family had their own private apartment. This was then followed by Brezhnevkas which were built taller, had larger apartments, and came with heretofore unavailable amenities such as elevators, interior bathrooms, garbage disposals and central heating systems.

Up until the dissolution of the Soviet Union, all communal apartments were state-owned public housing. With the start of privatization in Russia, such apartments started to gain ownership, often parts of it being privatized by different persons, which often led to litigations and abuse.

A distinct characteristic of Soviet kommunalkas is that the scarcity of housing and obligatory residence registration (propiska) made it virtually impossible for residents to part ways in case of conflict.

== Life ==
=== Layout ===
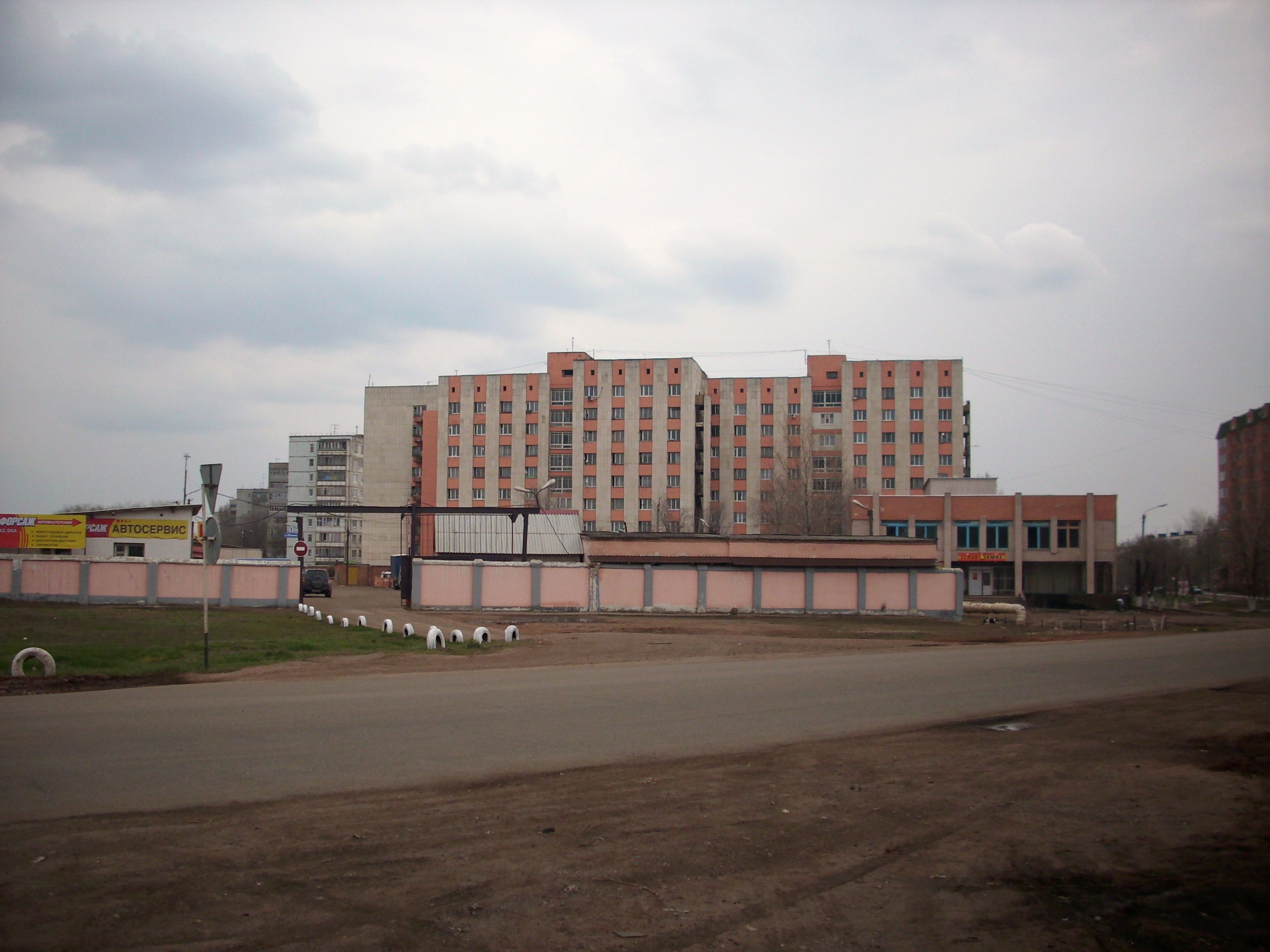
Building with communal apartments in Orenburg, Russia

Space in communal apartments was divided into common spaces and private rooms "mathematically or bureaucratically", with little to no attention paid to the physical space of the existing structures. Most apartments were partitioned in a dysfunctional manner, creating "strange spaces, long corridors, and so-called black entrances through labyrinthine inner courtyards."

Residents were meant to share the kitchen, bathroom and corridors amongst themselves, but even these spaces could be divided. For example, each family might have their own kitchen table, gas burner, doorbell, and even light switch, preferring to walk down the hall to use their light switch to turn on the bathroom lights rather than using a closer switch belonging to another resident. The hallways were often poorly lit, because each family had control of one of the lights hanging in the corridor, and would only turn it on for their own benefit. Though communal apartments were relatively small, residents had to wait at times to use the bathroom or kitchen sink. The kitchen was the primary place the residents interacted with one another and scheduled shared responsibilities. Wary of theft, residents rarely left groceries in the kitchen unless they put locks on the kitchen cabinets. However, they often stored their toiletries in the kitchen as opposed to the bathroom, because other residents could more easily use things left unattended in the bathroom. Laundry was left to dry in both the kitchen and the bathroom.

=== Dynamics ===
The communal apartment was the only living accommodation in the Soviet Union where the residents had "no particular reason to be living together." Other forms of communal living were based around type of work or other commonalities, but the communal apartment residents were placed together at random, as a result of the distribution of scarce living space by a governing body. These residents had little commitment to communal living or to each other. In spite of the haphazard nature of their cohabitation, residents had to navigate communal living, which required shared responsibilities and reliance on one another. Duty schedules were posted in the kitchen or corridors, typically assigning one family to be "on duty" at any given moment. The family on duty would be responsible for cleaning the common spaces by sweeping and mopping the kitchen every few days, cleaning the bathroom and taking out the trash. The length of time a family was scheduled to work usually depended on the size of the family, and the rotation followed the order of the rooms in the apartment.

Tenants in communal apartments are "like family in some respects and like strangers in others." Neighbors were forced to interact with each other, and they knew nearly everything about each other, their schedules and daily routines, profession, habits, relationships and opinions, prohibiting any sense of privacy in the communal apartment. A woman that lived in a kommunalka described her experience of communal living, "both intimate and public, with a mixture of ease and fear in the presence of strangers and neighbours".

The communal kitchen was an epicenter of the communal life in the apartment: gossips, lies, defamation, news, dramas, and nasty jokes. Spying was especially prevalent in the communal apartment like nowhere else, because of the extremely close quarters in which people lived and where everyone heard of each other. It was not unusual for a neighbor to look or listen into another resident's room or the common room and to gossip about others.

Cultural theorist Svetlana Boym stated that the communal apartment was "a breeding ground of police informants". Some people resorted to denouncing their neighbours for their conviction in the fight against elements opposed to the Soviet government, others to obtain their room in case they were imprisoned. Some individuals chose to get married simply to upgrade to a bigger apartment. One way that families were able to improve their living conditions was to "exchange" their living quarters. If a family was separated by divorce they could trade spaces, for example one could swap out one large space for two smaller units to accommodate a family. As result of all these unsolvable problems, many of the former residents of communal apartments look either fondly or negatively back on their experience in communal living, although there are some people who are nostalgic for that lifestyle.

Historian Yuri Kruzhnov stated that kommunalkas "breed a certain type of psychology. It was not uncommon for people to refuse to move out because they needed the companionship and interaction that came from living in such a place, even the antagonism and adrenaline", but nowadays most residents have a negative attitude towards communal apartments.

== In popular culture ==
- One of the conflicts in the satirical novel Heart of a Dog are the attempts of a house committee to "compactify" professor Preobrazhensky's spacious apartment
- Cohabitation, a 1918 Soviet silent film with the plot based on "compaction"
- In the satirical novel The Little Golden Calf, a kommunalka under the name "Crow's Horde" ("voronya slobodka") is described
- Ninotchka, a 1939 American comedy film features a scene which takes place in a Soviet communalka
- The popular catchphrase of Voland about Soviet Muscovites from Mikhail Bulgakov's Master and Margarita alludes to tough life in kommunalkas: "They're people like any other people...<>...In general, reminiscent of the former ones ... the housing problem has only corrupted them."
- In the 1965 American film, Doctor Zhivago, there is a storyline showing post-Revolutionary "compactification"
- The Russian-American poet Joseph Brodsky drew inspiration from life in the kommunalka.
- Grigori Rasputin's five-room apartment was turned into a kommunalka.
- Vladimir Putin grew up in a kommunalka in Leningrad (Saint Petersburg).

== See also ==
- Microdistrict
- Co-living
- Slums
