= Academic centre =

An academic centre (British English), or academic center (American English), refers to an organizational body created for a specific purpose. Generally, it is aimed at research, alternative educational programs, the development of innovative start-ups, and entrepreneurial initiatives related to academic activities. It may also be created for students' academic, financial, and socio-emotional success through various programs and services. Academic centres are schools, sixth form colleges, colleges and universities.

In many countries, academic centers are established by universities or other institutions of higher education. Higher education institutions are more entrepreneurial than ever before. When academic centers are founded by higher education institutions based on the results of a research group with commercial objectives, this is also called a spin-off. Academic and research institutions are interested in attracting funding for their research activities, and spin-offs represent the success of their commercial orientation.

== History ==
The word "academy" comes from the Attic Greek word Ἀκαδήμεια and Koine Greek word Ἀκαδημία. The name goes back to Plato's school of philosophy, founded around 386 BCE in the olive grove garden of Akademos, north of Athens, Greece. Plato's Academy was destroyed in 86 BCE.

The meaning of the word "center" as a building or organization dedicated to a specific activity arose in the United States in the 1880s.

In the early 20th century, the first academic centers were established by medical institutions in North America. At that time, hospitals were not involved in medical education and research. In 1910, Professor Abraham Flexner wrote a report about the state of American medical schools that fostered the development of Academic Health Centers over the next decades in the USA.

The Academic Centre, or the centre for general theoretical and programme direction, was one of the organs of the People's Commissariat for Education in the Soviet Russia. On the strength of the "Statute of the People's Commissariat for Education", approved by the Council of People's Commissars on February 11, 1921, the Academic Centre was to consist of a scientific section (State Scientific Council) with three subsections–scientific-political, scientific-technical and scientific-pedagogical—and an arts section (Chief Arts Committee) with five subsections: literature, theatre, music, figurative arts and the cinema. In addition, the Central Archives Board and the Central Museum Board were part of the Academic Centre.

One of the first academic centers in Europe was established in 1922 by the University of Padua, aimed at studying the history of this University.
