= People's Commissariat =

Structure in the Soviet government from 1917–1946

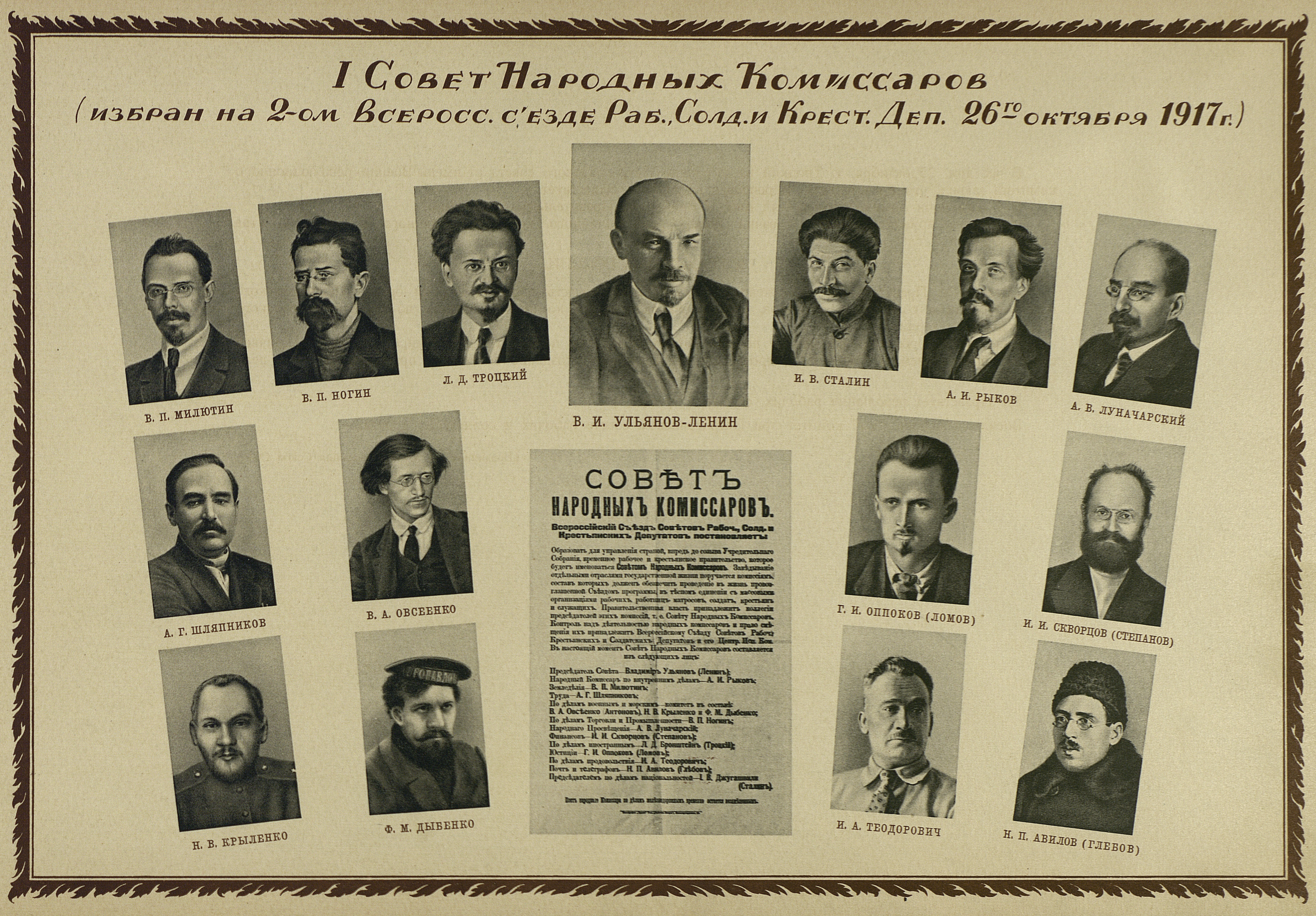
The First Council of People's Commissars

A People's Commissariat (Russian: народный комиссариат, romanized: narodnyy komissariat; narkomat) was a structure in the Soviet state from 1917–1946 which functioned as the central executive body in charge of managing a particular field of state activity or a separate sector of the national economy; analogue of the ministry. As a rule, a People's Commissariat was headed by a people's commissar (Russian: народный комиссар; narkom), which was part of the government – the Council of People's Commissars of the appropriate level.

Commissariats were created as central organs of state administration when the Soviet Union was established in the territory of the former Russian Empire.

The number of People's Commissariats changed in accordance with the requirements of the current moment; overall it increased due to the separation of existing ones and the formation of new ones.

== First People's Commissariats ==
The first People's Commissariats were created by the "Decree on the establishment of the Council of People's Commissars", adopted by the 2nd Congress of Soviets on November 9, 1917. The decree was established:

The management of certain branches of state life is entrusted to commissions, whose composition should ensure the implementation of the program proclaimed by the Congress, in close union with the mass organizations of workers, women workers, sailors, soldiers, peasants and employees. Government power is vested in the collegium of the chairmen of these commissions, that is, the Council of People's Commissars.

The All-Russian Congress of Soviets and its executive body, the All-Russian Central Executive Committee, had the right to control the activities of the People's Commissars and to remove them.

By the same decree the first composition of the Council of People's Commissars was formed, including the list of People's Commissariats:

- People’s Commissariat for Internal Affairs;
- People's Commissariat of Agriculture;
- People's Commissariat of Labor;
- People's Commissariat for Military and Naval Affairs;
- People's Commissariat of Trade and Industry;
- People's Commissariat of Education;
- People's Commissariat of Finance;
- People's Commissariat for Foreign Affairs;
- People's Commissariat of Justice;
- People's Commissariat of Food;
- People's Commissariat of Posts and Telegraphs;
- People's Commissariat of National Affairs;
- People's Commissariat of Railway Affairs.

Later, by a decree of the All-Russian Central Executive Committee and the Council of People's Commissars of December 15, 1917, the Supreme Council of National Economy under the Council of People's Commissars, which had the status of People's Commissariat, was established to organize and manage the national economy.

When Soviet power was established in other Soviet republics, similar commissariats were established on the territory of the former Russian Empire.

== Salary ==
The Council of People's Commissars adopted on December 1, 1917, at the suggestion of Lenin, the decree "On the amount of remuneration of the people's commissars and senior officials" (published on December 6, 1917, in No. 16 of the "Newspapers of the Provisional Worker and Peasant Government"). According to the decree, the remuneration of the people's commissars was 500 rubles plus 100 rubles for each disabled family member, which was approximately equal to the average wage of the worker.

== People's Commissariats of the Soviet Republics ==
=== Russian Soviet Federative Socialist Republic ===
With minor changes and additions, the same list of people's commissariats of the Russian Soviet Federative Socialist Republic is also presented in Article 43 of the Constitution of the Russian Soviet Federative Socialist Republic of 1918 adopted by the 5th All-Russian Congress of Soviets.

==== Autonomous Republics ====
Article 11 of the Constitution of the Russian Soviet Federative Socialist Republic of 1918 provided for the opportunity for "regions differing in special life and national composition" to create autonomous regions with the formation of their regional Congresses of Soviets and their executive bodies, that is, the Councils of People's Commissars. Thus, in the Kirghiz Autonomous Socialist Soviet Republic, formed in 1926 as part of the Russian Soviet Federative Socialist Republic, in 1929 the Constitution was adopted, which reads:

People's Commissariats are established in the Kyrgyz Autonomous Soviet Socialist Republic to directly manage individual branches of government: 1) Internal Affairs, 2) Justice, 3) Education, 4) Health, 5) Social Security, 6) Agriculture, 7) Finance, 8) Labor, 9) Workers' and Dekhkan (Peasant) Inspections, 10) Trade, and 11) the Central Council of the National Economy, of which the first six are non-united (autonomous), and the last five are combined with the corresponding People's Commissariats of the Russian Socialist Federative Soviet Republic, implementing the directives of the last, submitting to the Central Executive Committee, its Presidium and the Council of People's Commissars of the Kyrgyz Autonomous Soviet Socialist Republic.

— The Constitution of the Kirghiz Autonomous Socialist Soviet Republic of 1929

=== Ukrainian Soviet Socialist Republic ===
The Constitution of the Ukrainian Soviet Socialist Republic, adopted in 1919, in article 14 established:

Heading individual branches of the country's management is assigned to special departments of the All-Ukrainian Central Executive Committee of the Soviets – the People's Commissariats headed by the Heads elected by the All-Ukrainian Central Executive Committee of the Councils. The number, subjects of department departments and their internal organization are established by the All-Ukrainian Central Executive Committee of the Councils.

— The Constitution of the Ukrainian Soviet Socialist Republic of 1919

However, no list of People's Commissariats was provided in the Constitution.

=== Relation with the Council of People's Commissars of the Soviet Union ===
Since the formation of the Soviet Union, the Union republics delegated part of their sovereign powers to the newly formed state, only a part of governance issues remained in their jurisdiction. The Treaty on the Creation of the Soviet Union (Article 18) defines the list of People's Commissariats, whose leaders were members of the Council of People's Commissars of the Republics:

- Supreme Council of National Economy;
- People's Commissariat of Agriculture;
- People's Commissariat of Food;
- People's Commissariat of Finance;
- People's Commissariat of Labor;
- People's Commissariat of Internal Affairs;
- People's Commissariat of Justice;
- People's Commissariat of Workers' and Peasants' Inspection;
- People's Commissariat of Education;
- People's Commissariat of Health;
- People's Commissariat of Social Security;
- People's Commissariat of National Affairs.

The Council of People's Commissars of the Republic with a deliberative vote also included representatives representing those People's Commissariats, whose leadership began to fall within the competence of the Soviet Union:

- People's Commissariat for Foreign Affairs;
- People's Commissariat for Military and Naval Affairs;
- People's Commissariat of Foreign Trade;
- People's Commissariat of Communications;
- People's Commissariat of Posts and Telegraphs.

== People's Commissariats of the Soviet Union ==
The creation of the Soviet Union was legally formalized by the Treaty on the Creation of the Soviet Union, which provided for the formation of the government of the union state. It was called the Council of People's Commissars of the Soviet Union; it included the chairman of the Council of People's Commissars of the Soviet Union, his deputies, the leaders of the People's Commissariats of the Soviet Union.

The Treaty (Article 11) provides the following list of People's Commissariats of the Soviet Union:

- People's Commissariat for Foreign Affairs;
- People's Commissariat for Military and Naval Affairs;
- People's Commissariat of Foreign Trade;
- People's Commissariat of Communications;
- People's Commissariat of Posts and Telegraphs;
- People's Commissariat of Workers' and Peasants' Inspection;
- Supreme Council of National Economy;
- People's Commissariat of Labor;
- People's Commissariat of Food;
- People's Commissariat of Finance.

As the national economy developed and strengthened, the number of People's Commissariats at all levels increased. So, in 1932, the Supreme Council of the National Economy of the Soviet Union was transformed into three people's commissariat:

- People's Commissariat of Heavy Industry;
- People's Commissariat of Light Industry;
- People's Commissariat of the Forest Industry.

Further, from 1936 to 1939, the number of People's Commissariats increased to 24. For example, in 1939, the People's Commissariats of Fish Industry and Meat and Dairy Industry were divided off from the People's Commissariat of Food Industry USSR.

== Transformation into ministries ==
In 1946, the People's Commissariats of all levels were transformed into ministries of the same name.
