= People's Commissariat for Education =

Soviet ministry responsible for education

- Народный комиссариат просвещения

Agency overview
- Formed: 1917
- Preceding agency: Ministry of National Education of the Russian Empire
- Dissolved: 1946
- Superseding agency: Ministry of Education
- Jurisdiction: Council of People's Commissars
- Headquarters: Moscow, RSFSR
- Annual budget: varied

The People's Commissariat for Education (or Narkompros; Russian: Народный комиссариат просвещения, Наркомпрос, directly translated as the "People's Commissariat for Enlightenment") was the Soviet agency charged with the administration of public education and most other issues related to culture. In 1946, it was transformed into the Ministry of Education. Its first head was Anatoly Lunacharsky. However he described Nadezhda Krupskaya as the "soul of Narkompros". Mikhail Pokrovsky, Dmitry Leshchenko and Evgraf Litkens also played important roles.

Lunacharsky protected most of the avant-garde artists such as Vladimir Mayakovsky, Kazimir Malevich, Vladimir Tatlin and Vsevolod Meyerhold. Despite his efforts, the official policy after Joseph Stalin put him in disgrace.

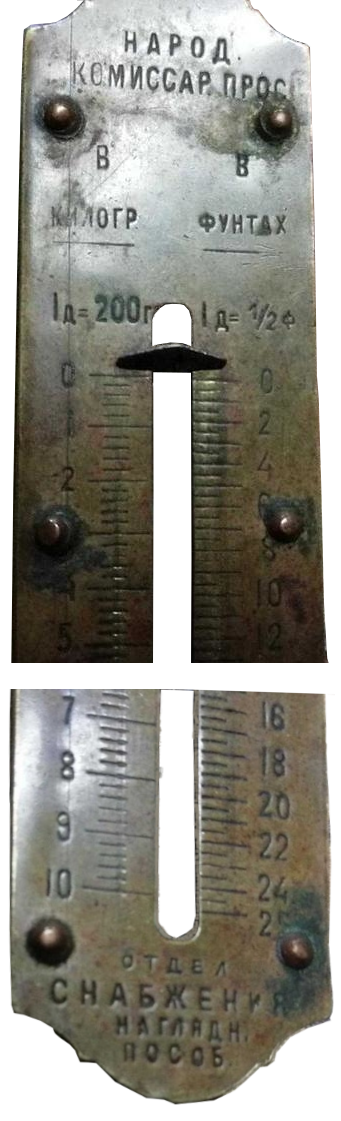
A spring steelyard with a maximum capacity of 10 kg or 25 pounds. Inscription at top: "People's Commissariat of Education"; top left: "In kilograms, 1 division = 200 grams"; top right: "In pounds, 1 division = 1/2 pound." Bottom: "Department of Supplies and Visual Aids." The dual-scale scale was used as a visual aid for weighing and educating the population during the transition from pounds to kilograms, that is, from the old weight system in the Russian Empire to the new one in the USSR.

Narkompros had seventeen sections, in addition to the main ones related to general education, e.g.,

- Likbez, a section for liquidation of illiteracy,
- "Profobr", a section for professional education,
- Glavlit, a section for literature and publishing (also in charge of censorship in publishing),
- "Glavrepertkom" (Главрепертком), a commission for approval of performers' repertoires.
- Department of the Mobilisation of Scientific Forces, to which the Russian Academy of Sciences reported after 1918.
- TEO, the Theatre Department which published Vestnik Teatra
- Vneshkol'nyi Otdel, the adult Education Department run by Krupskaya
- "Glavpolitprosvet", in charge of political education out of school

Some of these evolved into separate entities, others discontinued.

== Relationship with Proletkult ==
Pavel Lebedev-Polianskii, as chair of the Organizing Bureau for the National Proletkult argued that Narkompros, as a state organ, had responsibilities for the whole of society, whereas Proletkult asserted its autonomy as an organisation set up specifically for workers class. However, there was concern with "parallelism" - the situation which arose when similar work was carried out in parallel by different organisations. In early 1918 Narkompros gave Proletkult a budget of over 9,200,000 rubles, whereas the entire Adult Education Division received 32,500,000 rubles.

== Izo-Narkompros ==
The Izo-Narkompros (Изо-наркомпрос), or the section of visual arts (отдел изобразительных искусств), was created on 29 January 1918. It consisted of two parts: the collegium (deliberative organ) and the section proper (executive organ). The first collegium was headed by Vladimir Tatlin and included Kasimir Malevich, Ilya Mashkov, Nadezhda Udaltsova, Olga Rozanova, Alexander Rodchenko, Wassily Kandinsky, David Shterenberg, Natan Altman, Wladimir Baranoff-Rossine. It was subdivided into a number of subsections.

Lunacharsky directed some of the great experiments in public arts after the Revolution such as the agit-trains and agit-boats, that circulated over all Russia spreading Revolution and revolutionary arts. He also gave support to Constructivism's theatrical experiments and the initiatives such as the ROSTA Windows, revolutionary posters designed and written by Mayakovsky, Rodchenko, and others.

Izo-Narkompros also published Iskusstvo kommuny (Art of the Commune) of which 19 issues appeared between 7 December 1918 and April 1919.

== Film industry ==
Lenin saw film as the most important medium for educating the masses in the ways, means and successes of communism. As a consequence Lenin issued the "Directives on the Film Business" on 17 January 1922, which instructed the Narkompros to systemise the film business, registering and numbering all films shown in the Russian Soviet Federative Socialist Republic, extracting rent from all privately owned cinemas and subject them to censorship.

== People's Commissars ==
Name	Took office	Left office	Duration
Anatoly Lunacharsky	26 October 1917	12 September 1929	11 years, 321 days
Andrei Bubnov	12 September 1929	12 October 1937	8 years, 30 days
Pyotr Tyurkin	12 October 1937	29 March 1940	2 years, 169 days
Vladimir Potemkin	29 March 1940	23 February 1946	5 years, 331 days

== See also ==
- Foreign Literature Committee
- Ministry of Education (Russia)
- Academic Centre
