= Mys Shmidta =

Mys Shmidta Мыс Шмидта
- Urban-type settlement
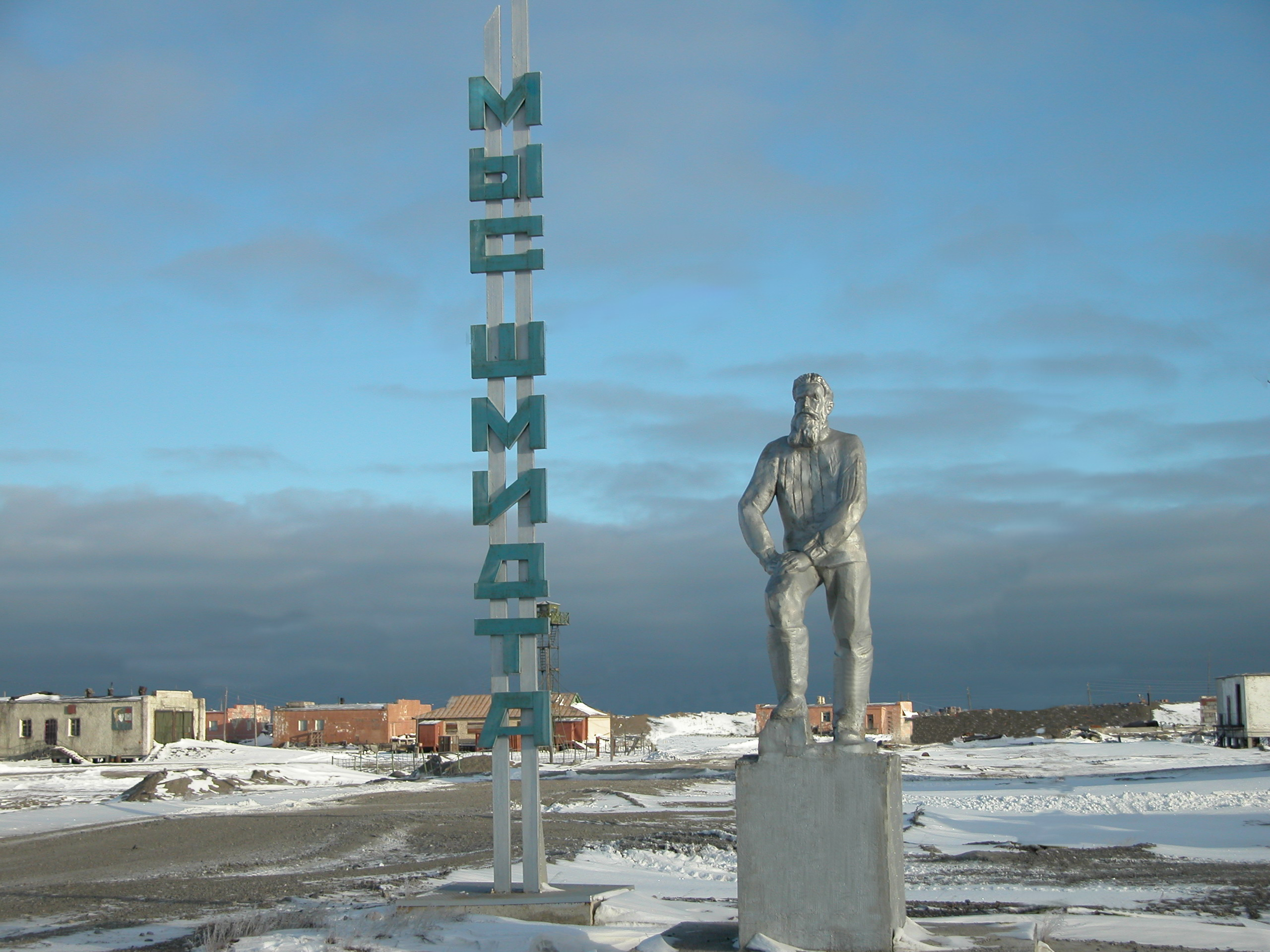
- Mys Shmidta during winter
- Interactive map of Mys Shmidta
- Location of Mys Shmidta Mys Shmidta (Chukotka Autonomous Okrug)
- Coordinates: 68°52′06″N 179°22′24″W
- Country: Russia
- Federal subject: Chukotka Autonomous Okrug
- Administrative district: Iultinsky District
- Founded: 1931
- Urban-type settlement status since: 1962

Area
  - Total: 137.81 km^{2} (53.21 sq mi)

Population
  - Estimate (January 2021): 37 )

Municipal status
  - Municipal district: Iultinsky Municipal District
  - Urban settlement: Mys Shmidta Urban Settlement
  - Capital of: Mys Shmidta Urban Settlement
- Time zone: UTC+12 (MSK+9)
- Postal code: 689350
- Dialing code: +7 42739
- OKTMO ID: 77715000056

Mys Shmidta (Russian: Мыс Шми́дта, lit. Cape Schmidt) is an urban locality (an urban-type settlement) in Iultinsky District of Chukotka Autonomous Okrug, Russia, located about 5 kilometers (3 mi) southeast of the cape of the same name on the shore of the Chukchi Sea (a part of the Arctic Ocean), south of Wrangel Island, about 650 kilometers (400 mi) from Anadyr, the administrative center of the autonomous okrug. The cape, but not the settlement, was formerly known as North Cape (or Cape North). Cape Billings is located to the west of it and Cape Vankarem is to the east. As of the 2021 Census, its population was 37, down from 705 recorded in the 2002 Census.

It was founded in 1931 as a part of the Soviet Union's development of its Arctic air defenses. Changes in the manner in which national defenses are constructed in recent decades have led to a decline in the settlement's importance, although it remains Chukotka's most important main northern sea port after Pevek.

== History ==
Cape North, or Cape Schmidt as it is now called, was first reached by James Cook in 1778 when he sailed through the Bering Strait and into the Chukchi Sea, demonstrating to people in Europe and North America that Russia and Alaska were separated.

The modern settlement was founded in 1931 as a part of the Soviet Union's attempts to develop the extreme northeast of the country. The settlement itself, its airport, and the nearby cape were all named after Otto Schmidt, with Mys Shmidta forming the central base for the enterprises involved in the mining of tin and gold.

In 1954, the airfield was developed as part of the plan to create a ring of Soviet Air Force air bases around the Arctic for the use of its strategic bomber fleet during the Cold War. During the Cold War, this airfield formed a network of forward staging bases inside the Arctic Circle. The use of strategic bomber forward staging bases was dictated by geography and weather. The northern parts of the Soviet Union closest to the United States are in the Arctic, with hostile weather conditions. Consequently, Soviet strategic bombers were normally stationed at bases in more temperate parts of the Soviet Union, flying training missions from these forward staging bases.

In 1962, Mys Shmidta was granted urban-type settlement status.

Demographic changes
1970	1979	1989	2002	2010	2018
1,818	3,307	4,587	705	492	140

== Geography ==
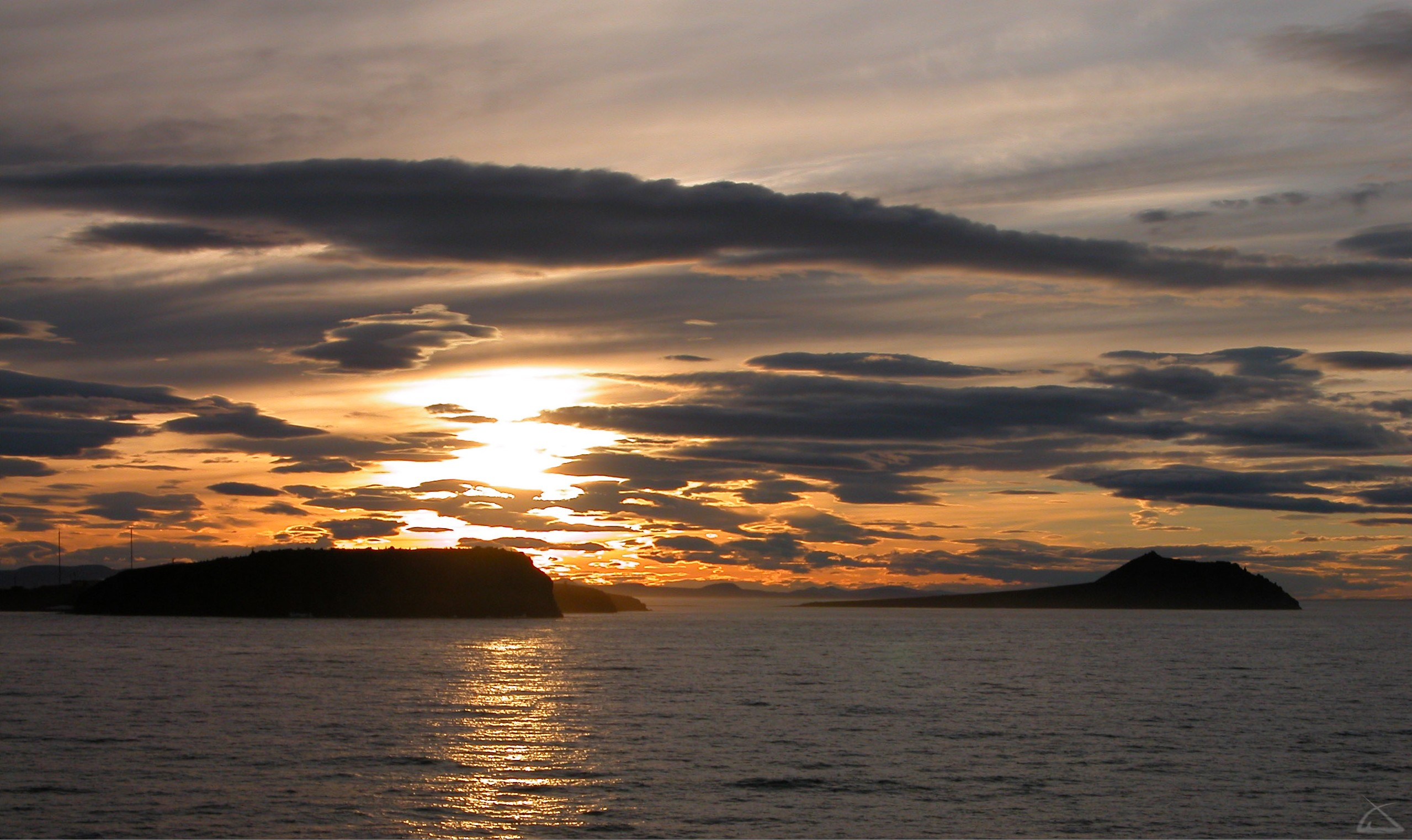
View of Cape Schmidt from the Chukchi Sea

The settlement is positioned on a spit which separates the Akatan Lagoon from the open sea and protects the airport from the full effects of the Arctic Ocean. A little distance to the northwest is the cape from which the settlement gets its name and just beyond this lies the rural Chukchi locality of Ryrkaypiy. Cape Yakan is located further to the west.

== Climate ==
Mys Shmidta, by the very nature of its location, has a polar climate (Köppen ET) and is at the mercy of Arctic conditions, which leaves it isolated throughout the winter and can pose a danger to shipping during the brief summer as supply ships try to make their deliveries. The lowest temperature ever recorded was −46.1 °C (−51.0 °F) recorded on 2 February 1978. The highest temperature recorded was 30 °C (86 °F) on 10 July 1953.

The importance attached to the summer months from a logistical standpoint was well illustrated in 1983, when winter set in earlier than predicted and resulted in Mys Shmidta and a number of other coastal ports in the Russian Far East closing early due to ice. Although unloading was delayed due to ice for a fortnight, the first supply ship convoy to Mys Shmidta arrived as planned. However, a severe drop in temperature through August, much earlier than usual, caused a significantly greater concentration of ice in the Long Strait and strong northerly winds forced the semi-permanent Ayon ice sheet onto the northern coast of Chukotka. By October, the ice had thickened to such a degree that a convoy of ships, including the freighter Nina Sagaydak, Kamensk-Uralsky, together with the icebreakers Kapitan Sorokin and Vladivostok, was held fast by October in sea ice about halfway between Mys Shmidta and Vankarem. This proved chaotic with several ships drifting freely in the ice, hulls grinding against one another. Although the ships eventually separated, the damage cause to the Nina Sagaydak proved too severe and she sank; the first ship to be sunk by ice in Soviet waters since the Vitimles in 1963. The remaining ships were freed by icebreakers and towed to the edge of the sea ice. This situation placed great strain on the settlement's resources as it struggled to deal with such a large amount of shipping and the associated problem of how to store a much larger than usual quantity of cargo, much of which was not intended to be frozen, while authorities readied the winter snow roads.

Climate data for Mys Shmidta Airport weather station (ICAO code: UHMI, WMO identifier: 25173), 2m amsl, 1981–2010 normals
Month	Jan	Feb	Mar	Apr	May	Jun	Jul	Aug	Sep	Oct	Nov	Dec	Year
Record high °C (°F)	9.8 (49.6)	5.2 (41.4)	8.9 (48.0)	8.1 (46.6)	16.1 (61.0)	28.3 (82.9)	30.0 (86.0)	29.2 (84.6)	22.7 (72.9)	11.9 (53.4)	8.6 (47.5)	6.9 (44.4)	30.0 (86.0)
Mean maximum °C (°F)	−9.3 (15.3)	−11.4 (11.5)	−4.8 (23.4)	−2.0 (28.4)	6.3 (43.3)	17.4 (63.3)	22.3 (72.1)	19.4 (66.9)	12.3 (54.1)	2.6 (36.7)	−0.9 (30.4)	−6.8 (19.8)	23.8 (74.8)
Mean daily maximum °C (°F)	−22.5 (−8.5)	−22.5 (−8.5)	−19.6 (−3.3)	−13.0 (8.6)	−1.9 (28.6)	5.6 (42.1)	8.8 (47.8)	7.3 (45.1)	3.2 (37.8)	−4.4 (24.1)	−12.0 (10.4)	−19.4 (−2.9)	−7.5 (18.4)
Daily mean °C (°F)	−25.8 (−14.4)	−25.9 (−14.6)	−23.5 (−10.3)	−17.2 (1.0)	−5.1 (22.8)	2.7 (36.9)	5.5 (41.9)	4.5 (40.1)	0.9 (33.6)	−7.2 (19.0)	−15.1 (4.8)	−22.6 (−8.7)	−10.7 (12.7)
Mean daily minimum °C (°F)	−29.0 (−20.2)	−29.3 (−20.7)	−27.3 (−17.1)	−21.4 (−6.5)	−8.2 (17.2)	−0.3 (31.5)	2.2 (36.0)	1.6 (34.9)	−1.5 (29.3)	−9.9 (14.2)	−18.2 (−0.8)	−25.6 (−14.1)	−13.9 (7.0)
Mean minimum °C (°F)	−38.9 (−38.0)	−39.7 (−39.5)	−37.3 (−35.1)	−32.2 (−26.0)	−21.2 (−6.2)	−4.7 (23.5)	−0.9 (30.4)	−1.4 (29.5)	−8.1 (17.4)	−20.7 (−5.3)	−30.2 (−22.4)	−36.4 (−33.5)	−41 (−42)
Record low °C (°F)	−45.7 (−50.3)	−46.1 (−51.0)	−45.7 (−50.3)	−39 (−38)	−32.5 (−26.5)	−11.3 (11.7)	−4.7 (23.5)	−7.1 (19.2)	−17.8 (0.0)	−37 (−35)	−39.6 (−39.3)	−45.4 (−49.7)	−46.1 (−51.0)
Average precipitation mm (inches)	14.3 (0.56)	14.2 (0.56)	8.0 (0.31)	12.2 (0.48)	14.6 (0.57)	17.1 (0.67)	32.6 (1.28)	39.9 (1.57)	36.1 (1.42)	31.3 (1.23)	27.2 (1.07)	17.4 (0.69)	264.9 (10.41)
Average rainy days	0	0.1	0.1	0.4	4	11	16	18	14	3	1	0.2	67.8
Average snowy days	16	15	14	16	15	4	1	1	8	20	20	17	147
Average relative humidity (%)	84	83	83	85	88	87	87	89	88	85	86	85	86
Average dew point °C (°F)	−26 (−15)	−26 (−15)	−25 (−13)	−18 (0)	−6 (21)	0 (32)	3 (37)	3 (37)	0 (32)	−6 (21)	−14 (7)	−20 (−4)	−11 (12)
Mean monthly sunshine hours	4	55	173	254	208	256	233	133	83	55	9	0	1,463
Source 1: Météo climat stats Météo Climat
Source 2: NOAA (sun only, 1961–1990) Source 3: Time and Date (dewpoints, between 2005–2015)

== Administrative and municipal status ==
Within the framework of administrative divisions, Mys Shmidta is directly subordinated to Iultinsky District. As a municipal division, the urban-type settlement of Mys Shmidta is incorporated within Iultinsky Municipal District as Mys Shmidta Urban Settlement.

== Economy ==
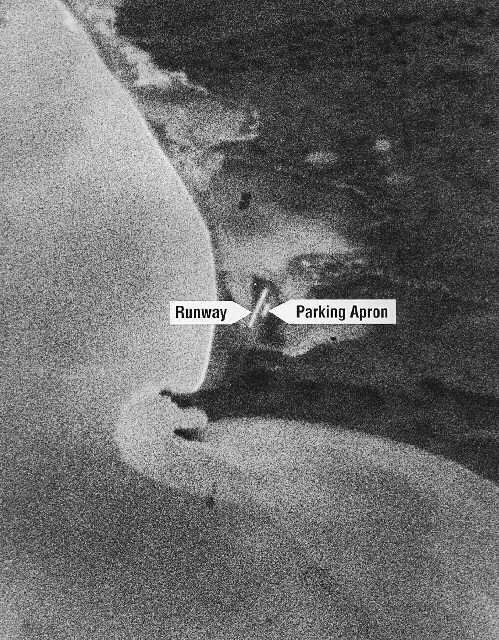
Mys Shmidta, 1961. The first recovered image from the Corona spy satellite (note that north is roughly toward the bottom of the picture).

The settlement is populated mostly by indigenous people, whose economy is driven mainly by reindeer herding and low level gold mining however, there is little mining done in the vicinity of Mys Shmidta.

=== Transportation ===
==== Port ====
The port at Mys Shmidta is generally open between July and September, although the waters surrounding the port are shallow which limits the type of ships that can serve the area, with the port operated by the Russian firm Almazzoloto.

Though it has shrunk since the days of the Cold War, Mys Shmidta is still alongside Pevek the main northern sea port in Chukotka. Following the dissolution of the Soviet Union, imports all but ceased in the early to mid-1990s, although in 1991 Mys Shmidta, importing nearly 30,000 tons of mainly American fuel, dealt with significantly more cargo than ports such as Pevek. The decline in the overall volume of cargo passing through Mys Shmidta continued throughout the 1990s, with less than 50,000 tons being handled in 1997 and just over 1,000 tons the following year, This is in part due to the declining economy of the region, which has caused a fall in investment in the port infrastructure, which, in turn, limits the maximum potential turnover of the port.

It is difficult to see where future cargo exports might come from. While gold is mined in Bilibino, with lower-level mining maintained at Iultin and Polyarny, these activities do not produce significant cargo volumes for the northern sea route, nor does the extraction of any other minerals in the area. Although part of the Northern Sea Route's series of ports, Mys Shmidta, as a port, will be dominated by imports of food and coal for the settlement and the surrounding rural localities.

A federal government decision in 1997 led to the establishment of an emergency radio station in Mys Shmidta as well as other northern Sea route ports to specifically monitor distress and salvage frequencies.

==== Air transport ====
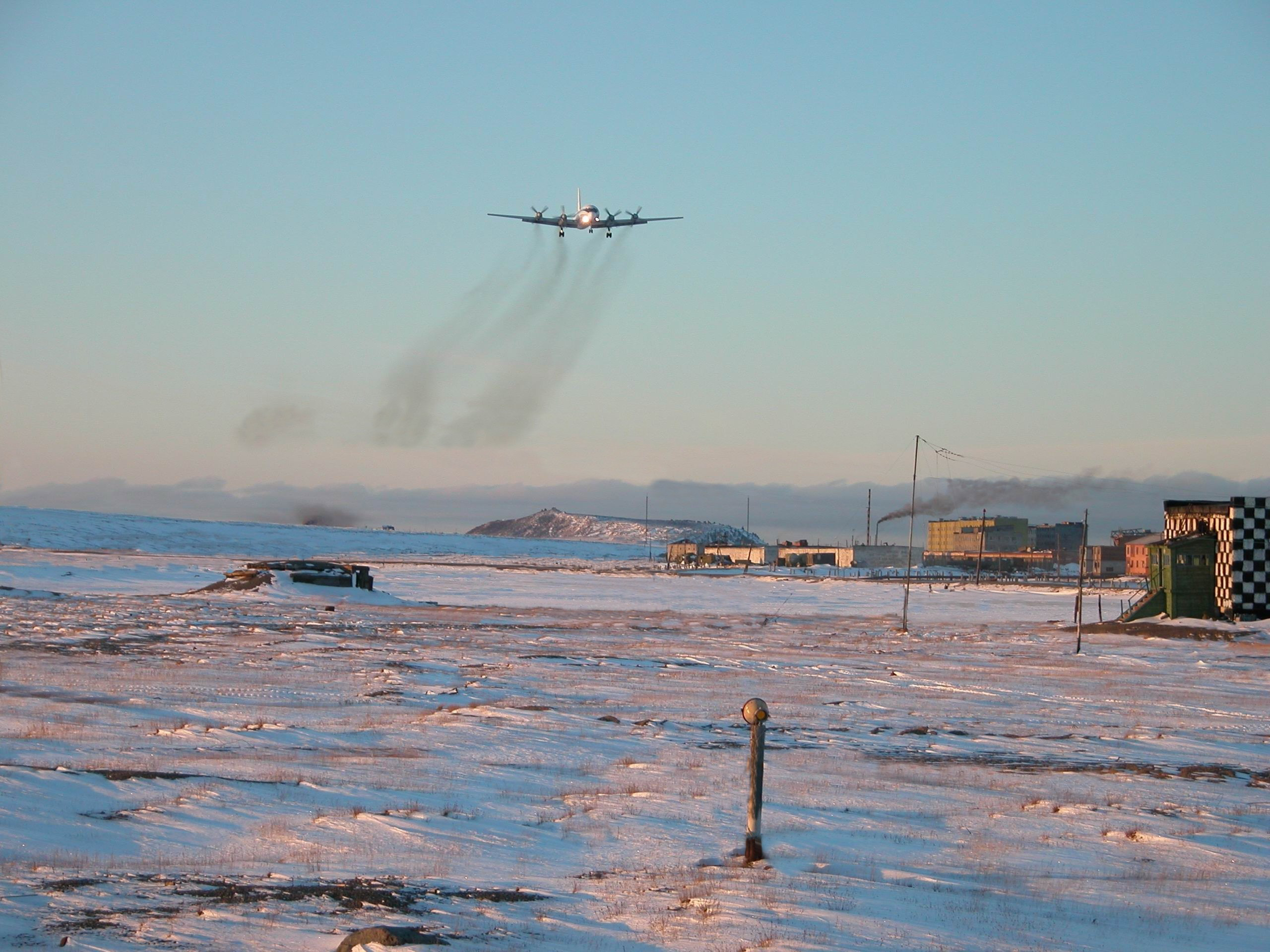
Ilyushin Il-18 taking off from the Mys Shmidta Airport

Immediately to the southwest of the settlement is the Mys Shmidta Airport.

==== Roads ====
Mys Shmidta is not connected to any other part of Chukotka by permanent road. Transport must either be by air or along unpaved roads. One such unpaved road is linking Mys Shmidta with Egvekinot. There is also a 435-kilometer (270 mi) road between Mys Shmidta and Komsomolsky, of which 235 kilometers (146 mi) is unpaved and the remaining 199 kilometers (124 mi) is a snow road.

=== Tourism ===
Mys Shmidta is the starting point for any tourist wishing to explore Wrangel Island, a UNESCO World Heritage Site. The nature reserve's headquarters are in Mys Shmidta.

== See also ==
- List of inhabited localities in Iultinsky District
