= Cape Schmidt =

Headland in the Chukotka Autonomous Okrug, Russian Federation

Cape Schmidt Мыс Шми́дта
- Cape
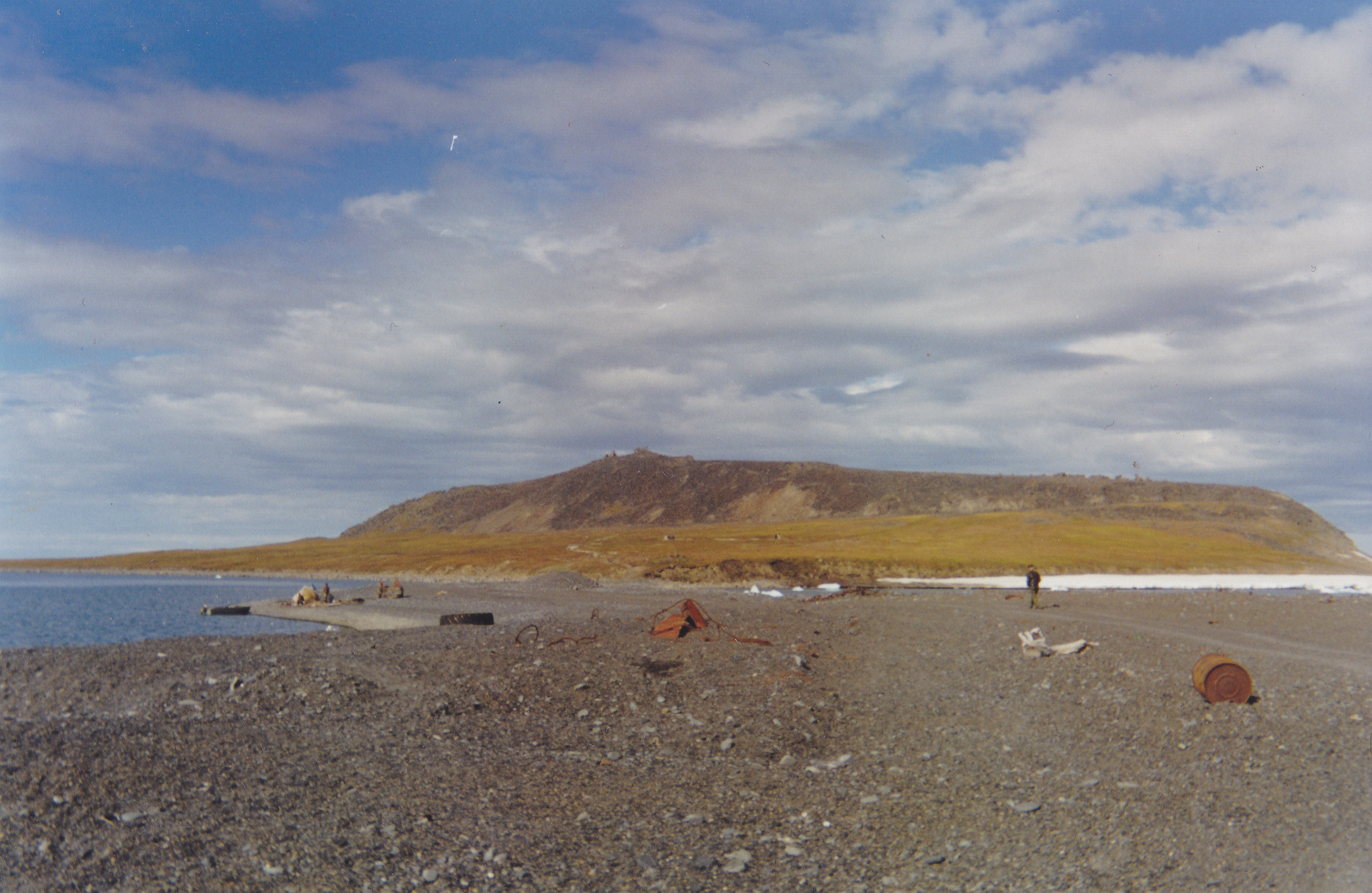
- View of Cape Schmidt

- Coordinates: 68°55′14″N 179°27′12″W
- Location: Chukotka, Russia
- Offshore water bodies: Chukchi Sea

Cape Schmidt (Russian: Мыс Шми́дта; Mys Shmidta or Мыс Отто Шмидта; Mys Otto Shmidta; Chukchi: Ир-Каппея; Ir-Kappeya), formerly known as Cape North, is a headland in the Chukchi Sea, part of Iultinsky District of the Chukotka Autonomous Okrug, Russian Federation.

== Geography ==
This headland is a rocky promontory located at the end of a spit. Cape Yakan is located to the west and Cape Vankarem to the east of Cape Schmidt.

The settlement of Mys Shmidta is located southeast of the headland and the Chukchi locality of Ryrkaypiy is located closer to the southwest.

An abandoned military base sits on the coast of the headland.

== Climate ==
Climate data for Mys Shmidta
| Month | Jan | Feb | Mar | Apr | May | Jun | Jul | Aug | Sep | Oct | Nov | Dec | Year |
|---|---|---|---|---|---|---|---|---|---|---|---|---|---|
| Record high °C (°F) | 9.8 (49.6) | 5.2 (41.4) | 8.9 (48.0) | 8.1 (46.6) | 16.1 (61.0) | 28.3 (82.9) | 30.0 (86.0) | 29.2 (84.6) | 22.7 (72.9) | 11.9 (53.4) | 8.6 (47.5) | 6.9 (44.4) | 30.0 (86.0) |
| Mean maximum °C (°F) | −9.3 (15.3) | −11.4 (11.5) | −4.8 (23.4) | −2.0 (28.4) | 6.3 (43.3) | 17.4 (63.3) | 22.3 (72.1) | 19.4 (66.9) | 12.3 (54.1) | 2.6 (36.7) | −0.9 (30.4) | −6.8 (19.8) | 23.8 (74.8) |
| Mean daily maximum °C (°F) | −22.5 (−8.5) | −22.5 (−8.5) | −19.6 (−3.3) | −13.0 (8.6) | −1.9 (28.6) | 5.6 (42.1) | 8.8 (47.8) | 7.3 (45.1) | 3.2 (37.8) | −4.4 (24.1) | −12.0 (10.4) | −19.4 (−2.9) | −7.5 (18.4) |
| Daily mean °C (°F) | −25.8 (−14.4) | −25.9 (−14.6) | −23.5 (−10.3) | −17.2 (1.0) | −5.1 (22.8) | 2.7 (36.9) | 5.5 (41.9) | 4.5 (40.1) | 0.9 (33.6) | −7.2 (19.0) | −15.1 (4.8) | −22.6 (−8.7) | −10.7 (12.7) |
| Mean daily minimum °C (°F) | −29.0 (−20.2) | −29.3 (−20.7) | −27.3 (−17.1) | −21.4 (−6.5) | −8.2 (17.2) | −0.3 (31.5) | 2.2 (36.0) | 1.6 (34.9) | −1.5 (29.3) | −9.9 (14.2) | −18.2 (−0.8) | −25.6 (−14.1) | −13.9 (7.0) |
| Mean minimum °C (°F) | −38.9 (−38.0) | −39.7 (−39.5) | −37.3 (−35.1) | −32.2 (−26.0) | −21.2 (−6.2) | −4.7 (23.5) | −0.9 (30.4) | −1.4 (29.5) | −8.1 (17.4) | −20.7 (−5.3) | −30.2 (−22.4) | −36.4 (−33.5) | −41 (−42) |
| Record low °C (°F) | −45.7 (−50.3) | −46.1 (−51.0) | −45.7 (−50.3) | −39 (−38) | −32.5 (−26.5) | −11.3 (11.7) | −4.7 (23.5) | −7.1 (19.2) | −17.8 (0.0) | −37 (−35) | −39.6 (−39.3) | −45.4 (−49.7) | −46.1 (−51.0) |
| Average precipitation mm (inches) | 14.3 (0.56) | 14.2 (0.56) | 8.0 (0.31) | 12.2 (0.48) | 14.6 (0.57) | 17.1 (0.67) | 32.6 (1.28) | 39.9 (1.57) | 36.1 (1.42) | 31.3 (1.23) | 27.2 (1.07) | 17.4 (0.69) | 264.9 (10.41) |
| Average rainy days | 0 | 0.1 | 0.1 | 0.4 | 4 | 11 | 16 | 18 | 14 | 3 | 1 | 0.2 | 67.8 |
| Average snowy days | 16 | 15 | 14 | 16 | 15 | 4 | 1 | 1 | 8 | 20 | 20 | 17 | 147 |
| Average relative humidity (%) | 84 | 83 | 83 | 85 | 88 | 87 | 87 | 89 | 88 | 85 | 86 | 85 | 86 |
| Mean monthly sunshine hours | 4 | 55 | 173 | 254 | 208 | 256 | 233 | 133 | 83 | 55 | 9 | 0 | 1,463 |
Source 1: Météo climat stats Météo Climat
Source 2: NOAA (sun only, 1961–1990)

== History ==
A Neolithic site of ancient marine hunters was found on the shore of Cape Schmidt. There are remains of ancient huts at the foot of the cliffs on the western side and there was an ancient Chukchi fortification at the top.

The local name of the landhead was Ir-Kappeya, meaning "Walrus constipation" in the Chukchi language. James Cook named the headland "Cape North" in 1778 when he sailed through the Bering Strait and into the Chukchi Sea, demonstrating to people in Europe and North America that Russia and Alaska were separated. The cape was renamed after Soviet scientist and first head of the Chief Directorate of the Northern Sea Route, Otto Schmidt in 1934.

== See also ==
- Mys Shmidta Airport

== Bibliography ==
- J. C. Beaglehole. The Life of Captain James Cook.
- M. C. Serreze and R. G. Barry. The Arctic Climate System
