= Pegtymel =

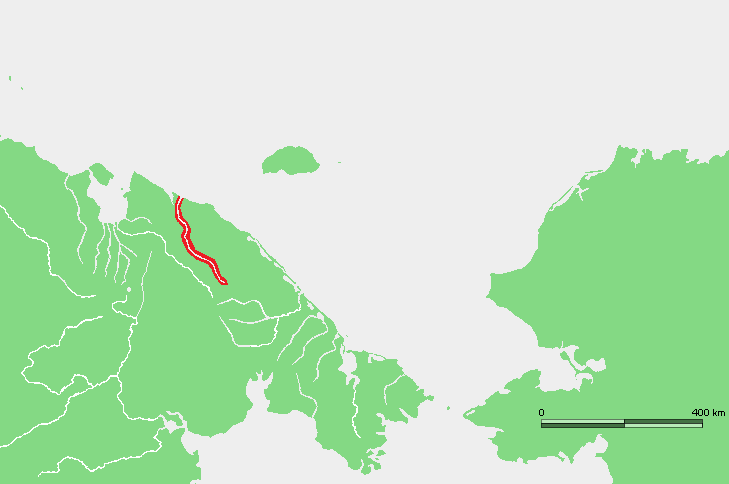
- Location of the Pegtymel course

Location
- Country: Russia

Physical characteristics
- Mouth: East Siberian Sea
  - coordinates: 69°54′11″N 173°52′03″E
- Length: 345 km (214 mi)
- Basin size: 17,600 km^{2} (6,800 sq mi)

The Pegtymel (Russian: Пегтымель) is a river in Chukotka. It is 345 kilometres (214 mi) long, and has a drainage basin of 17,600 square kilometres (6,800 sq mi). The Pegtymel and its tributaries belong to the Chukotka Autonomous Okrug administrative region of Russia.

The river passes through the sparsely populated areas of the Siberian tundra and flows into the East Siberian Sea west of the Long Strait. Its mouth is between Cape Shelagsky on Chaunskaya Bay and Cape Billings to the east. Its most important tributary is the Kuvet which joins it from the right side.

There are ancient rock paintings on a site close to the Pegtymel. The petroglyphs show boats, reindeer hunting, and mushroom-headed figures possibly representing a ritual with the hallucinogenic mushroom fly agaric (Amanita muscaria).
