= Ikikileruk Creek =

Stream in the state of Alaska

Coordinates: 68°57′30″N 164°06′27″W

Ikikileruk Creek is a stream in North Slope Borough, Alaska, in the United States. It flows to the Chukchi Sea.

Ikikileruk is derived from an Eskimo name meaning "narrow".

== See also ==
- List of rivers of Alaska
