= Vankarem =

Vankarem Ванкарем Ванӄарэман (Chukchi)
- Selo
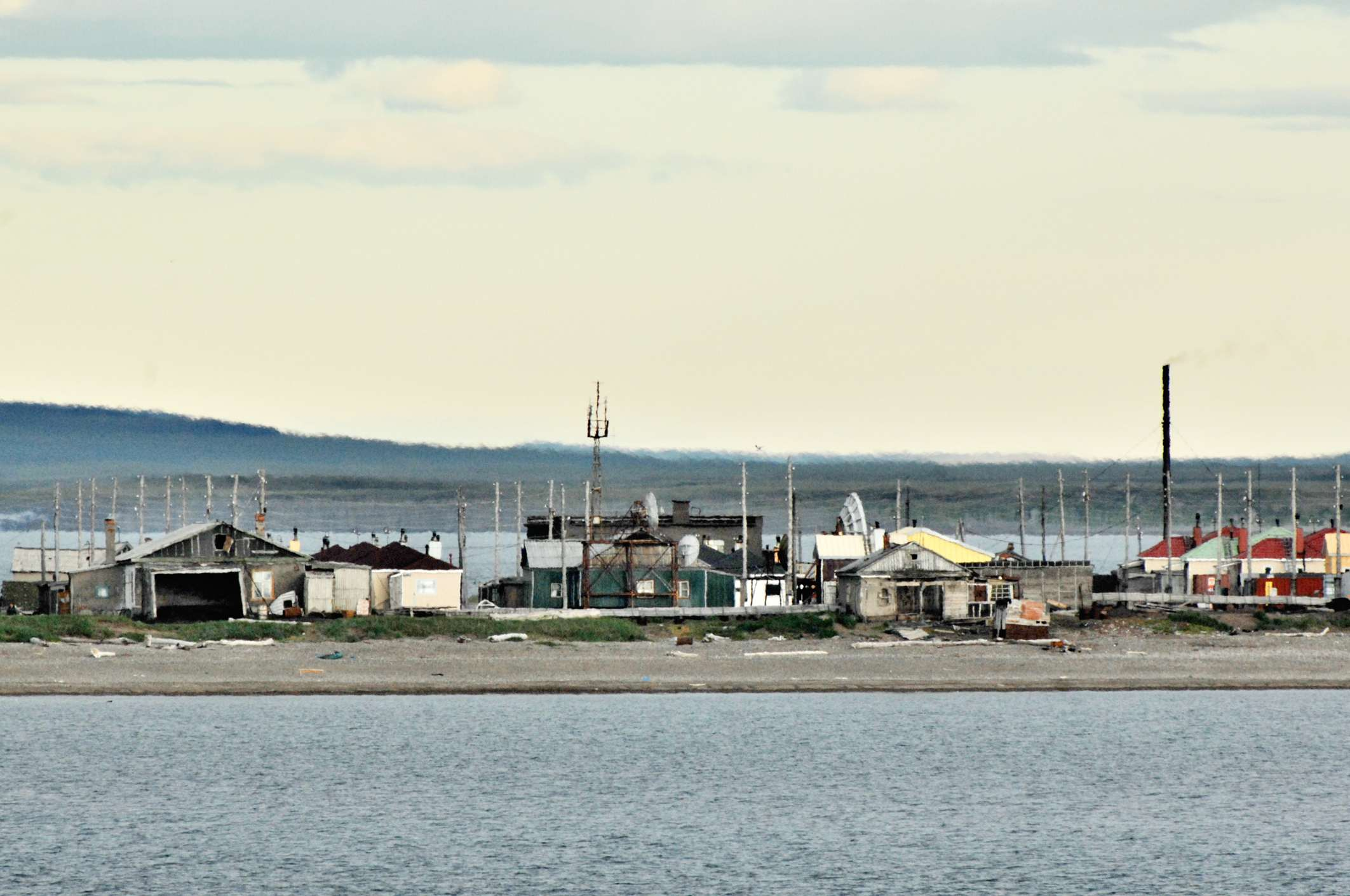
- View of Vankarem village
- Interactive map of Vankarem
- Location of Vankarem Vankarem (Chukotka Autonomous Okrug)
- Coordinates: 67°50′22″N 175°51′25″W
- Country: Russia
- Federal subject: Chukotka Autonomous Okrug
- Administrative district: Iultinsky District

Population (2010 Census)
  - Total: 184
  - Estimate (January 2016): 166 (−9.8%)

Municipal status
  - Municipal district: Iultinsky Municipal District
  - Rural settlement: Vankarem Rural Settlement
  - Capital of: Vankarem Rural Settlement
- Time zone: UTC+12 (MSK+9)
- Postal code: 689210
- Dialing code: +7 42734
- OKTMO ID: 77715000111

Vankarem (Russian: Ванкарем; Chukchi: Ванӄарэман, Vanḳarèman) is a village (selo) in Iultinsky District of Chukotka Autonomous Okrug, in the Far Eastern Federal District of Russia, situated on Cape Vankarem on the coast of the Chukchi Sea. Population: 184 (2010 census); Municipally, Vankarem is subordinated to Iultinsky Municipal District and incorporated as Vankarem Rural Settlement.

== Demographics ==
It is largely inhabited by indigenous Chukchi and Siberian Yupik people and has a population according to the most recent census results of 184, of whom 98 were male and 86 female, a reduction on an estimate made in 2006 of 210 people.

== History ==
The origins of the name of the settlement are disputed. Some people believe that the name is associated with the traditional beliefs commonly held by indigenous Asian Arctic peoples which equate sea creatures closely with humans and that the name comes from the Chukchi word ванӄарэман vankaremen 'Tusk People', as indigenous hunters referred to their prey as 'Walrus People'.

Other sources think that the name means "Temporarily Abandoned Bone Dwellings", a thought which has arisen due to puzzlement over the precise history of the settlement. The Chukchi who arrived in the area in the eighteenth and nineteenth centuries found well preserved homes built by a culture which they had previously not encountered and about which they knew nothing, and it is speculated that the settlement might have been abandoned because the previous inhabitants died from some form of epidemic. Indeed, Adolf Erik Nordenskiöld's expedition in the 1870s found a number of recently abandoned houses in the nearby village of Ryrkaypiy which were full of ivory carvings.

The inhabitants of the village played a key role in the rescue of the passengers and crew aboard the SS Chelyuskin, when it was crushed by ices near Kolyuchin Island in 1934.

== Wildlife ==
In 2006, participants of the World Wildlife Fund Bear Patrol project reported that the village was as besieged by polar bears, with up to thirty polar bears visiting the village every night.

== Economy ==
The region's ancient coastal hunting and fishing cultures are preserved by the local population.

=== Transport ===
There is an airfield in the village however, Vankarem is not connected to any other part of the world by road. There is however a road network within the village including the following streets:

- улица Ленина (Ulitsa Lenina, lit. Lenin Street)
- улица Прибойный (Ulitsa Priboyiniy)
- улица Рынтыргина (Ulitsa Ryntyrgina)
- улица Северная (Ulitsa Severnaya, lit. North Street)
- улица Челюскинцев (Ulitsa Chelyuskintsev, lit. Chelyuskintsy Street)
- улица Южная (Ulitsa Yuzhnaya, lit. South Street)

== Climate ==
Vankarem has a Tundra climate (ET) because the warmest month has an average temperature between 0 °C (32 °F) and 10 °C (50 °F).

Climate data for Vankarem
Month	Jan	Feb	Mar	Apr	May	Jun	Jul	Aug	Sep	Oct	Nov	Dec	Year
Record high °C (°F)	1.7 (35.1)	0.8 (33.4)	3.1 (37.6)	2.9 (37.2)	13.7 (56.7)	23.6 (74.5)	27.1 (80.8)	27.4 (81.3)	19.4 (66.9)	6.8 (44.2)	3.3 (37.9)	3.3 (37.9)	27.4 (81.3)
Mean daily maximum °C (°F)	−20.5 (−4.9)	−22.1 (−7.8)	−19.9 (−3.8)	−13.2 (8.2)	−2.3 (27.9)	5.4 (41.7)	10.2 (50.4)	8.4 (47.1)	4.0 (39.2)	−3.0 (26.6)	−10.3 (13.5)	−18.1 (−0.6)	−6.8 (19.8)
Daily mean °C (°F)	−23.9 (−11.0)	−25.5 (−13.9)	−23.8 (−10.8)	−17.3 (0.9)	−5.3 (22.5)	2.0 (35.6)	6.0 (42.8)	5.0 (41.0)	1.9 (35.4)	−5.1 (22.8)	−13.3 (8.1)	−21.2 (−6.2)	−10.0 (14.0)
Mean daily minimum °C (°F)	−27.3 (−17.1)	−28.8 (−19.8)	−27.3 (−17.1)	−21.4 (−6.5)	−8.2 (17.2)	−0.4 (31.3)	3.1 (37.6)	2.7 (36.9)	0.3 (32.5)	−7.2 (19.0)	−16.6 (2.1)	−24.2 (−11.6)	−12.9 (8.8)
Record low °C (°F)	−44.9 (−48.8)	−46.5 (−51.7)	−44.6 (−48.3)	−39.3 (−38.7)	−28.0 (−18.4)	−11.9 (10.6)	−6.2 (20.8)	−4.2 (24.4)	−10.1 (13.8)	−27.5 (−17.5)	−36.3 (−33.3)	−41.4 (−42.5)	−46.5 (−51.7)
Average precipitation mm (inches)	16.0 (0.63)	13.0 (0.51)	8.9 (0.35)	11.6 (0.46)	10.7 (0.42)	11.2 (0.44)	21.6 (0.85)	28.5 (1.12)	24.6 (0.97)	33.4 (1.31)	28.3 (1.11)	16.4 (0.65)	224.2 (8.82)
Average precipitation days	11.5	9.9	7.8	10.2	10.8	8.4	10.7	14.0	15.1	19.7	16.9	11.5	146.5

== Photo gallery ==
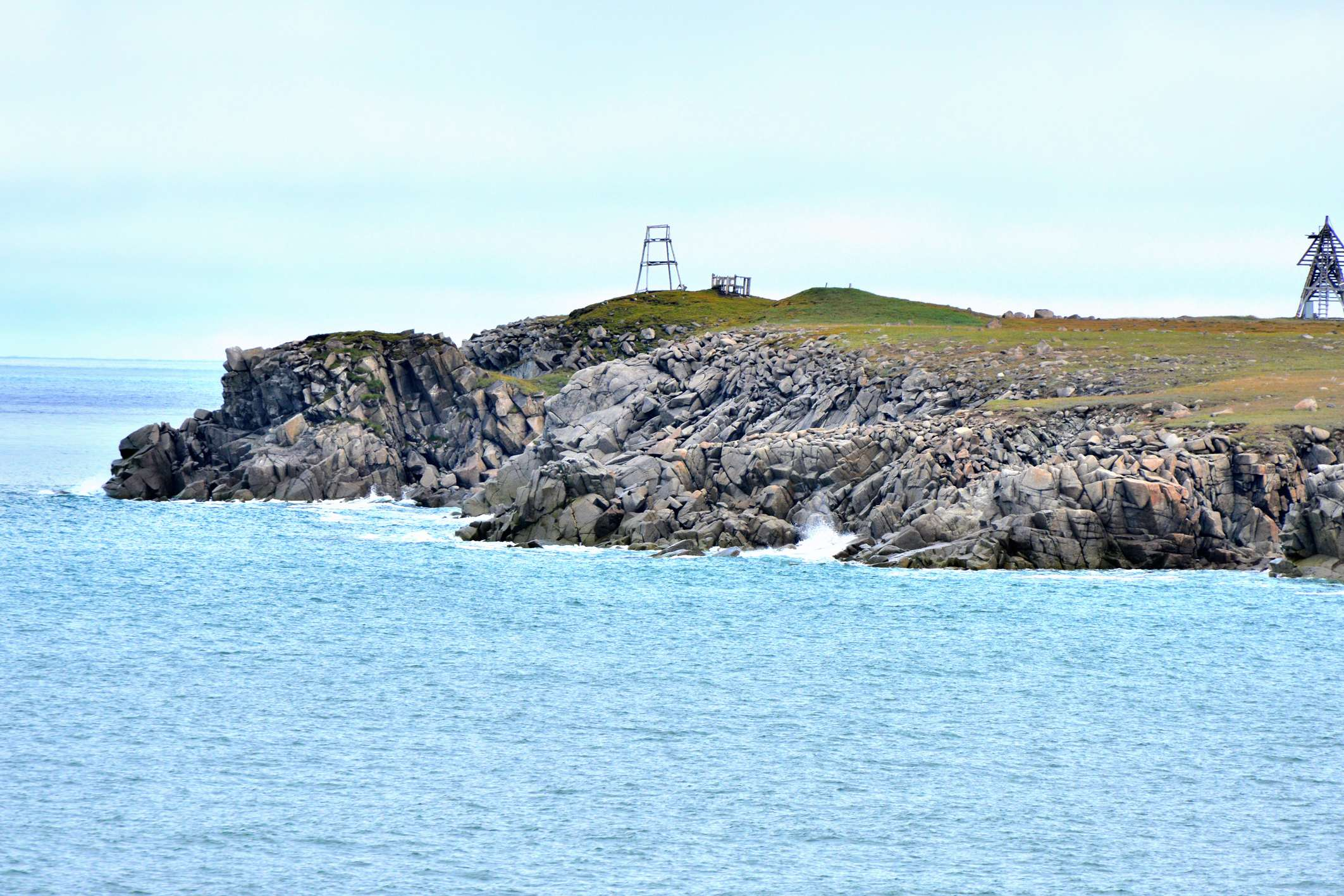
Cape Vankarem

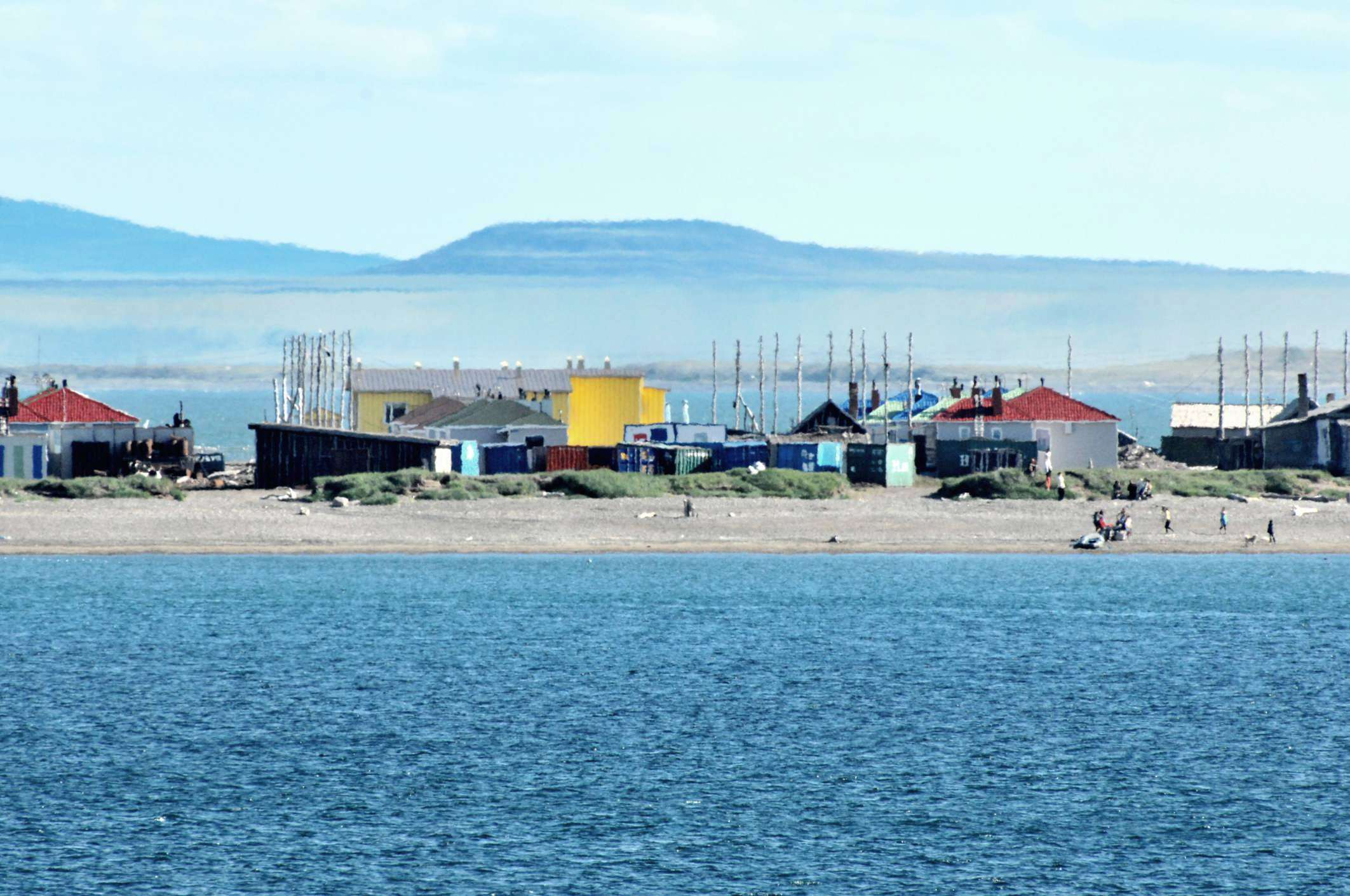
Vankarem

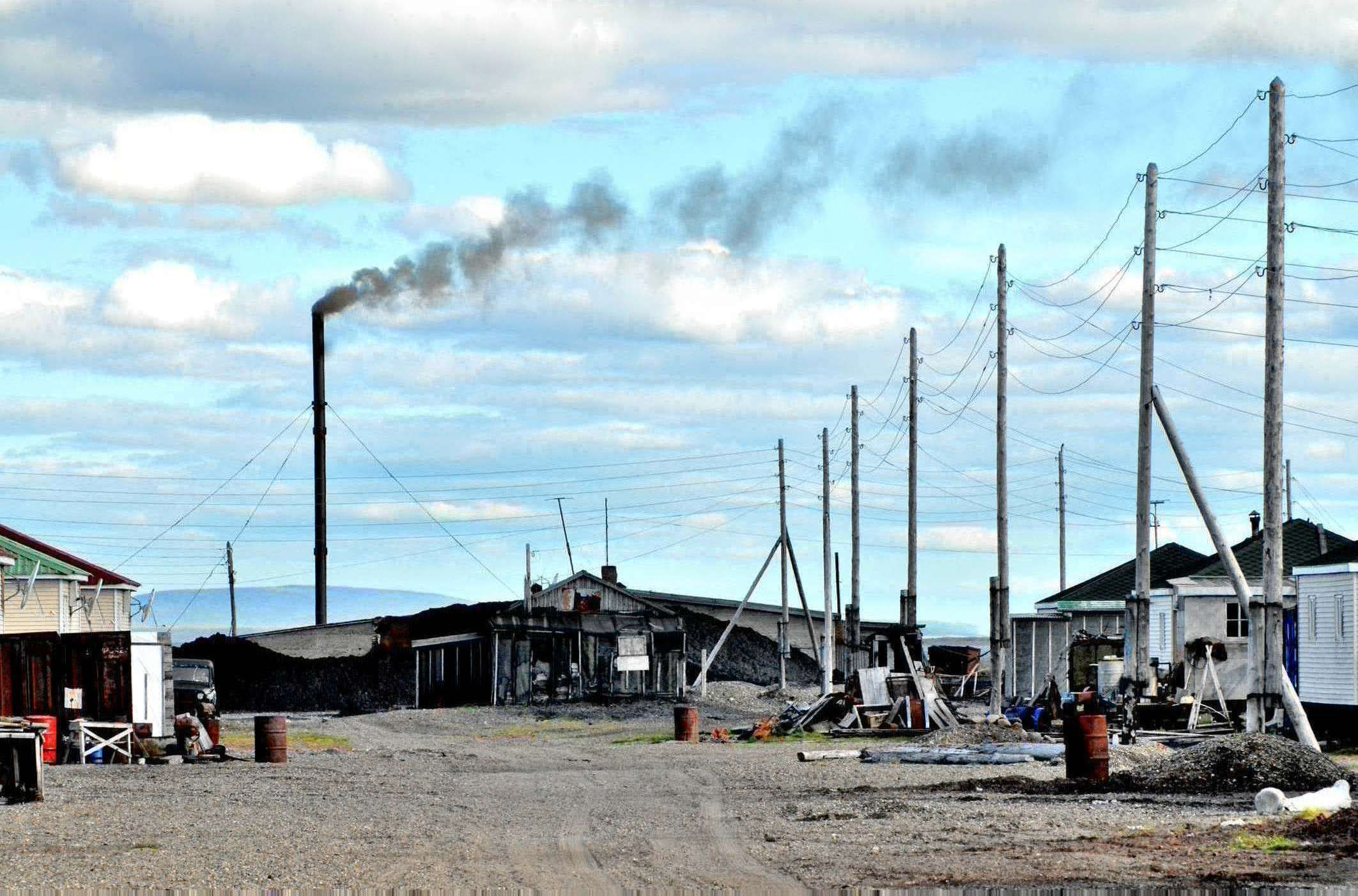
Vankarem,
main road

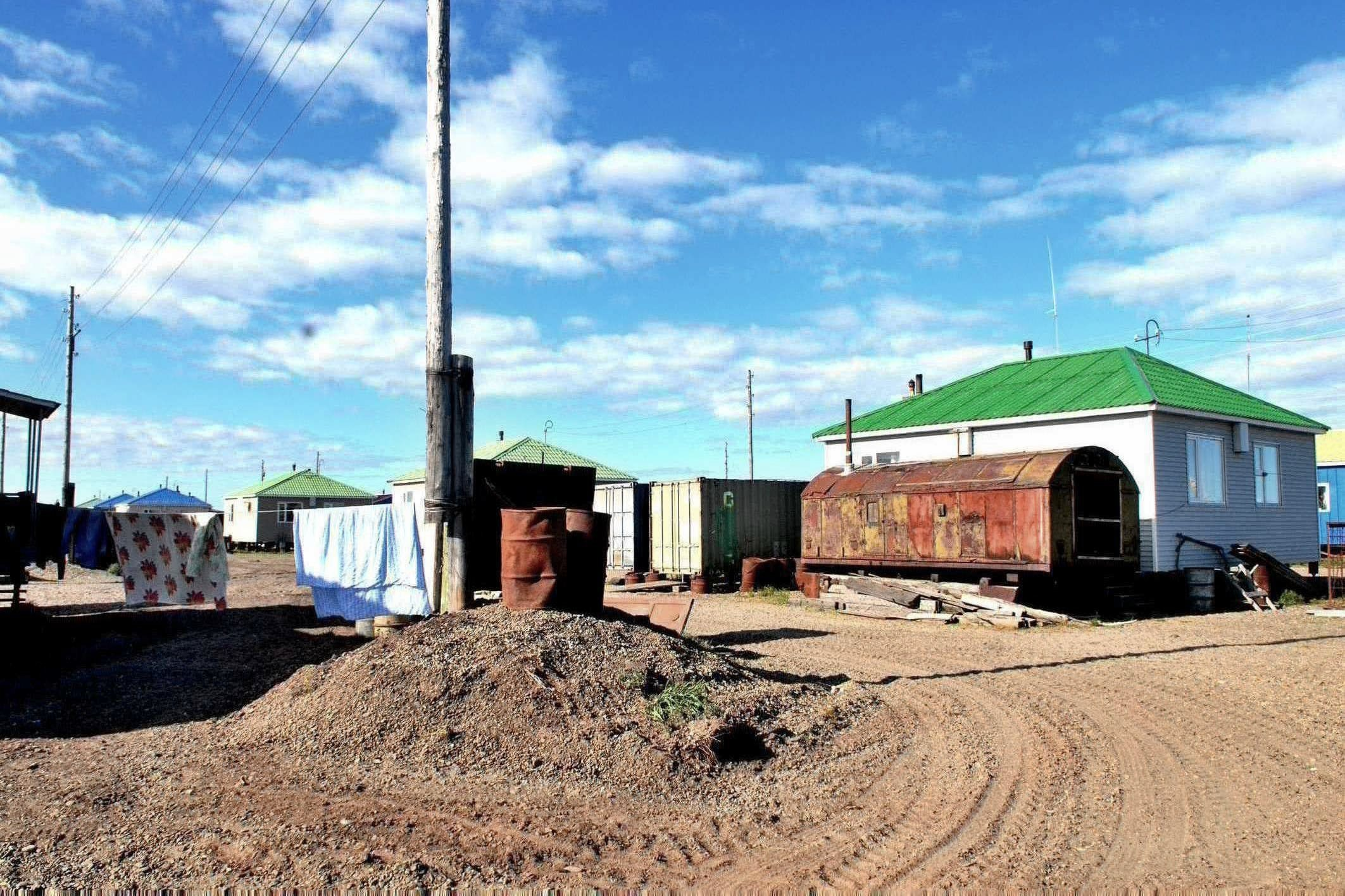
Vankarem,
street scene

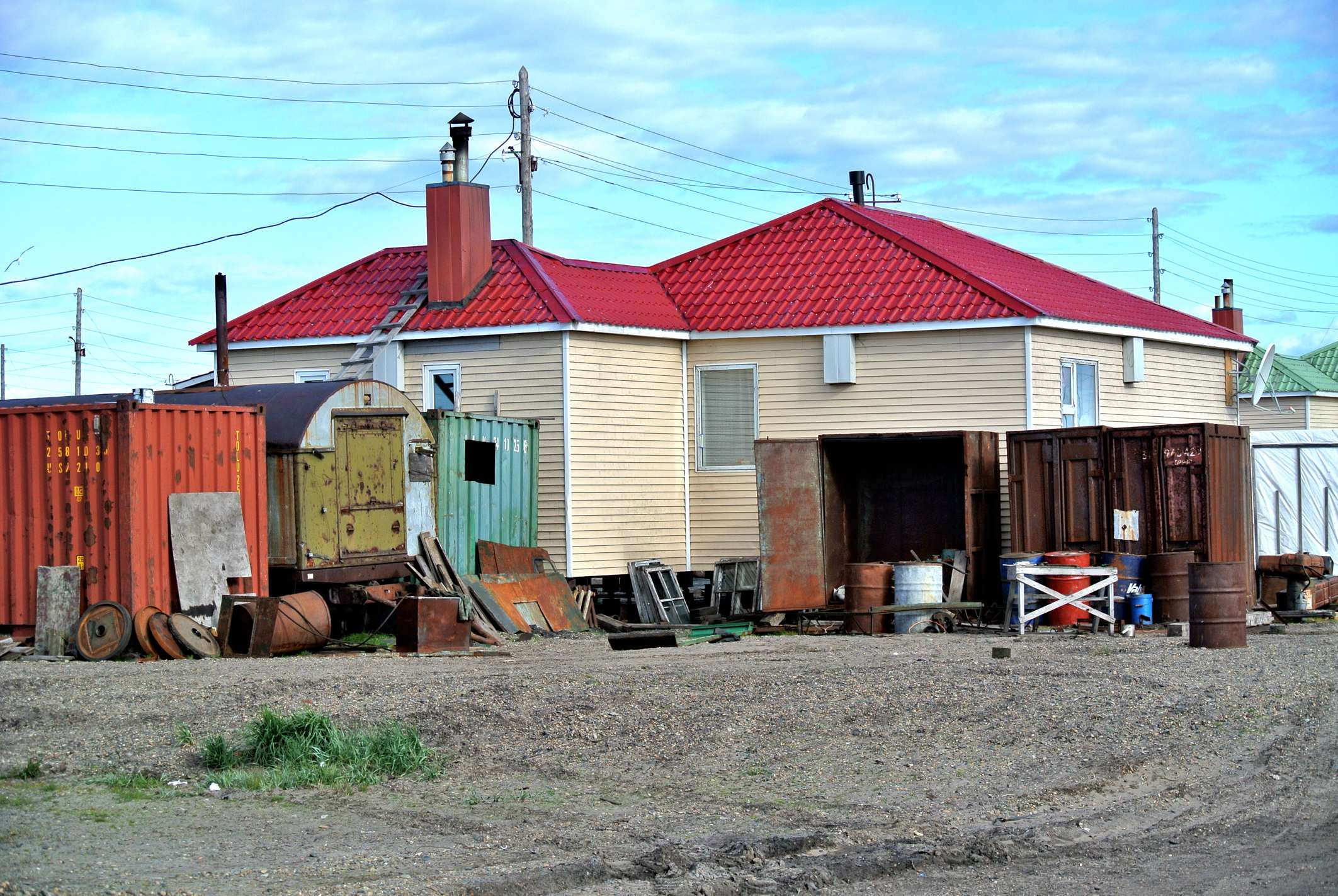
Vankarem,
street scene

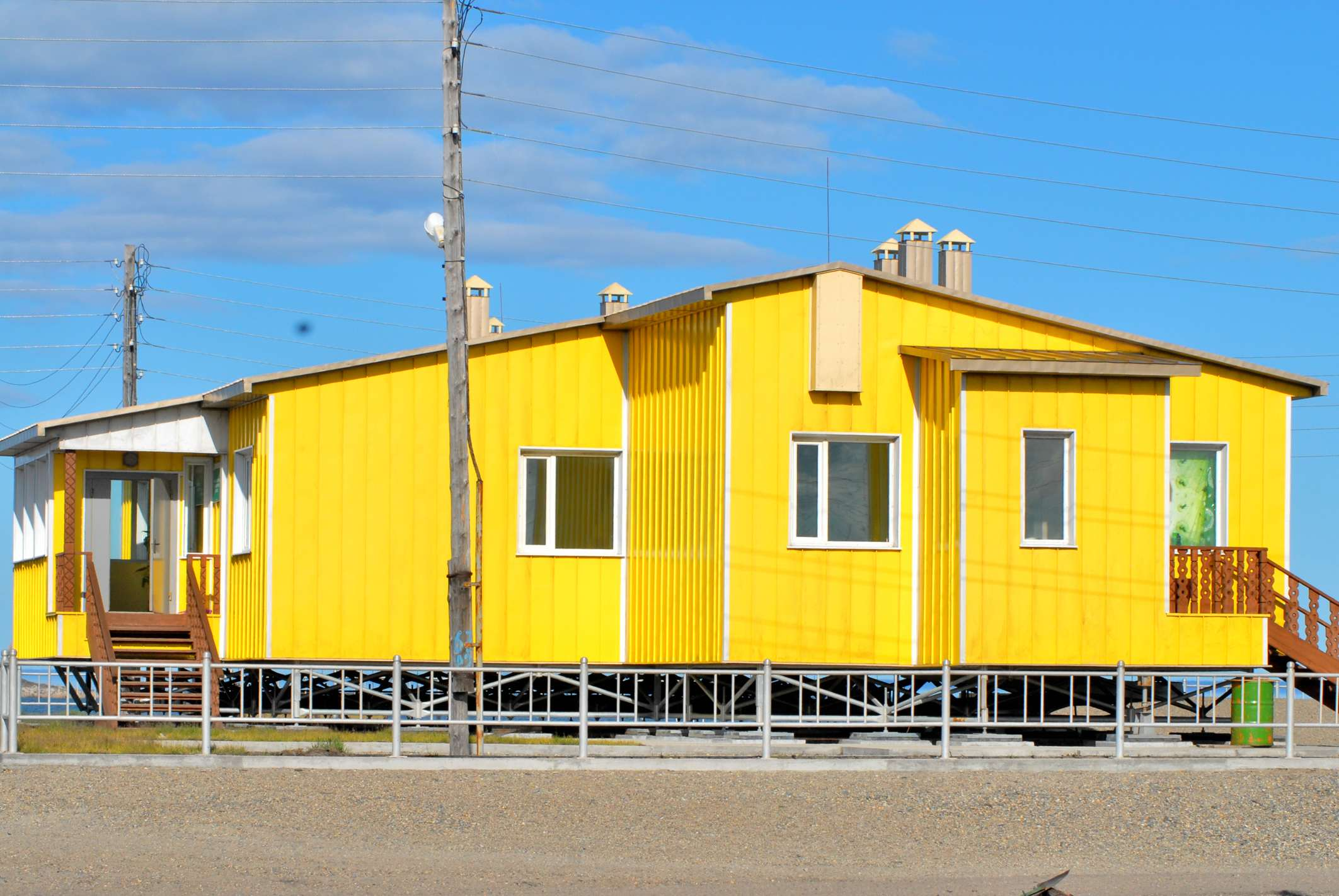
Vankarem,
health center

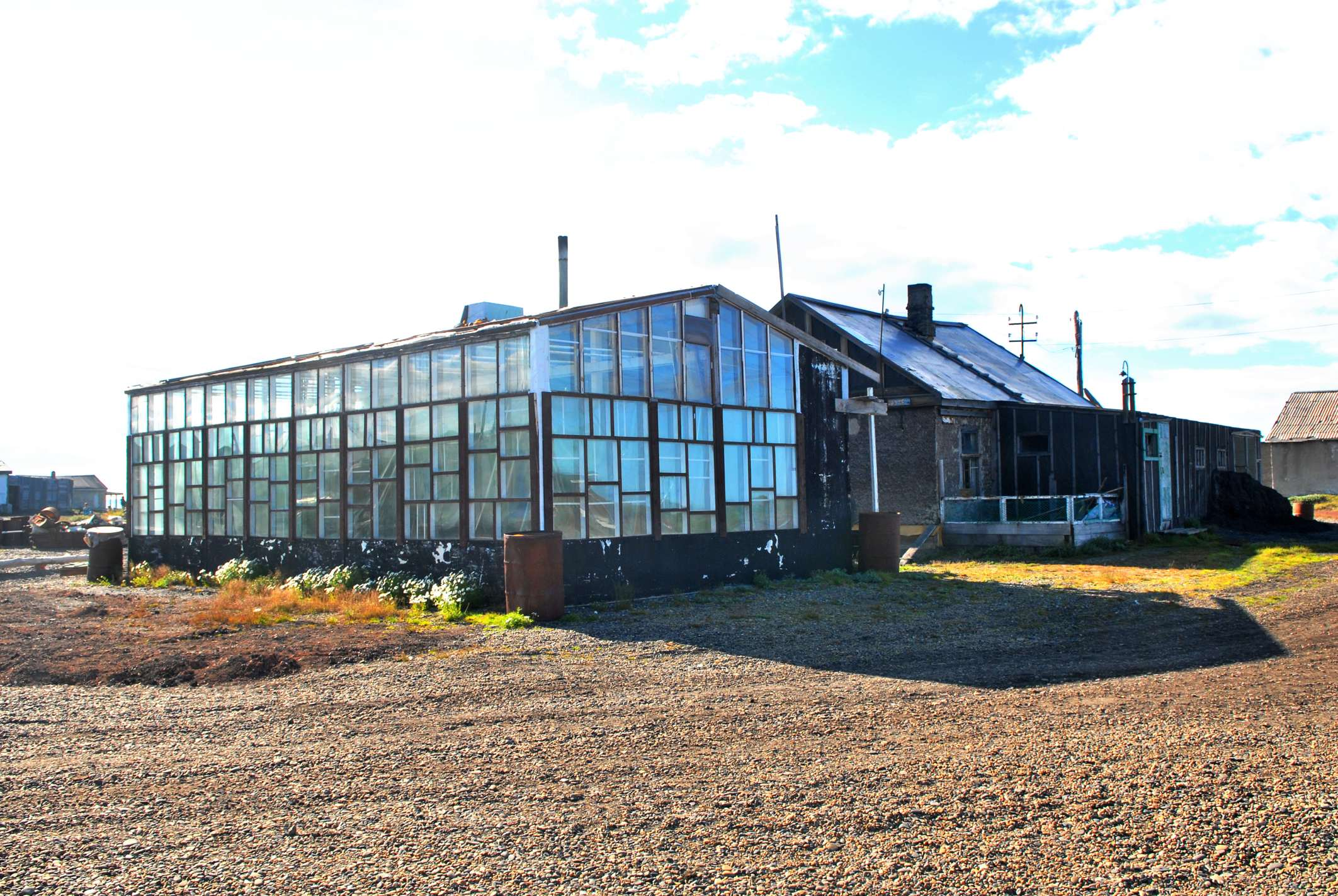
Vankarem,
greenhouse

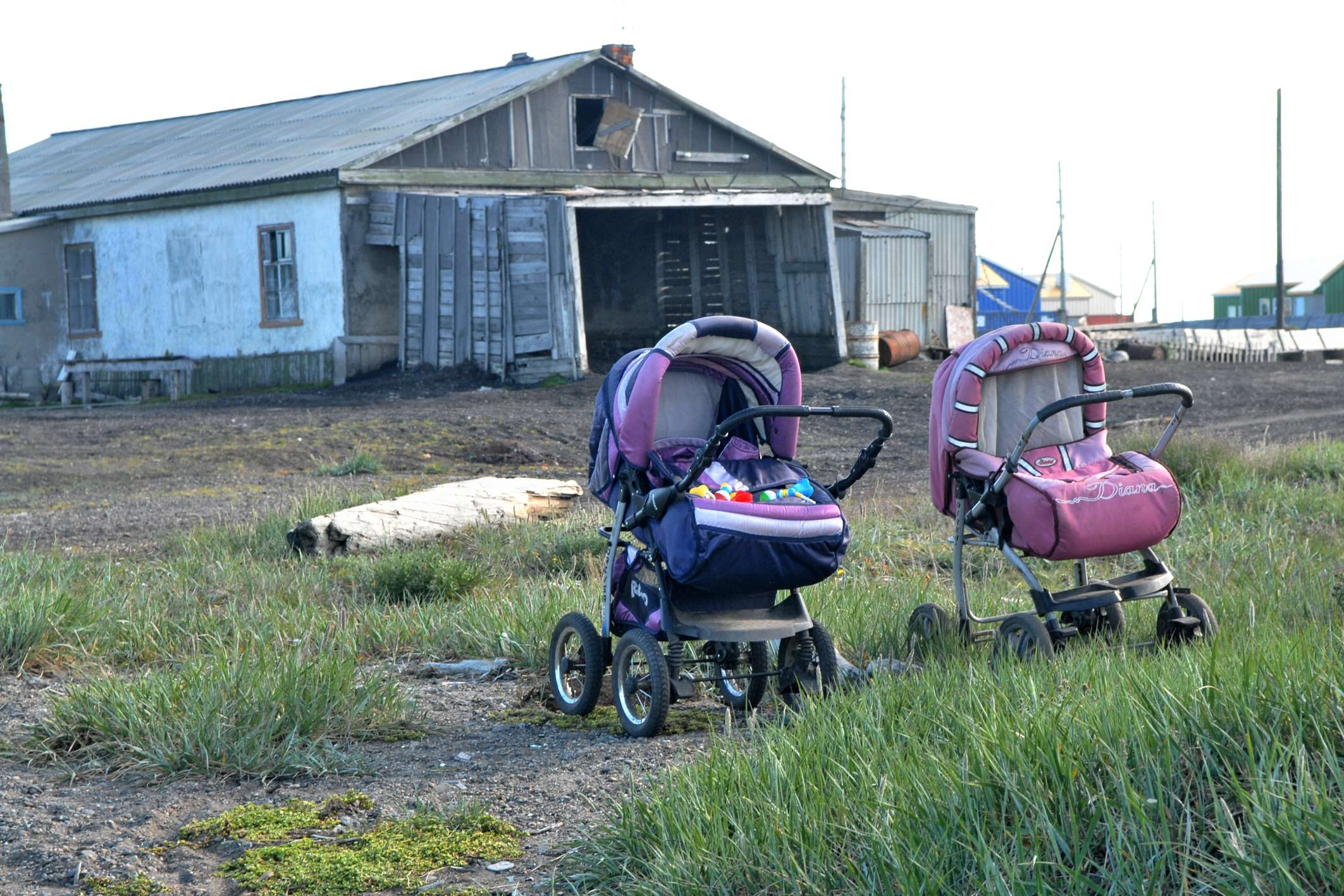
Vankarem,
still life

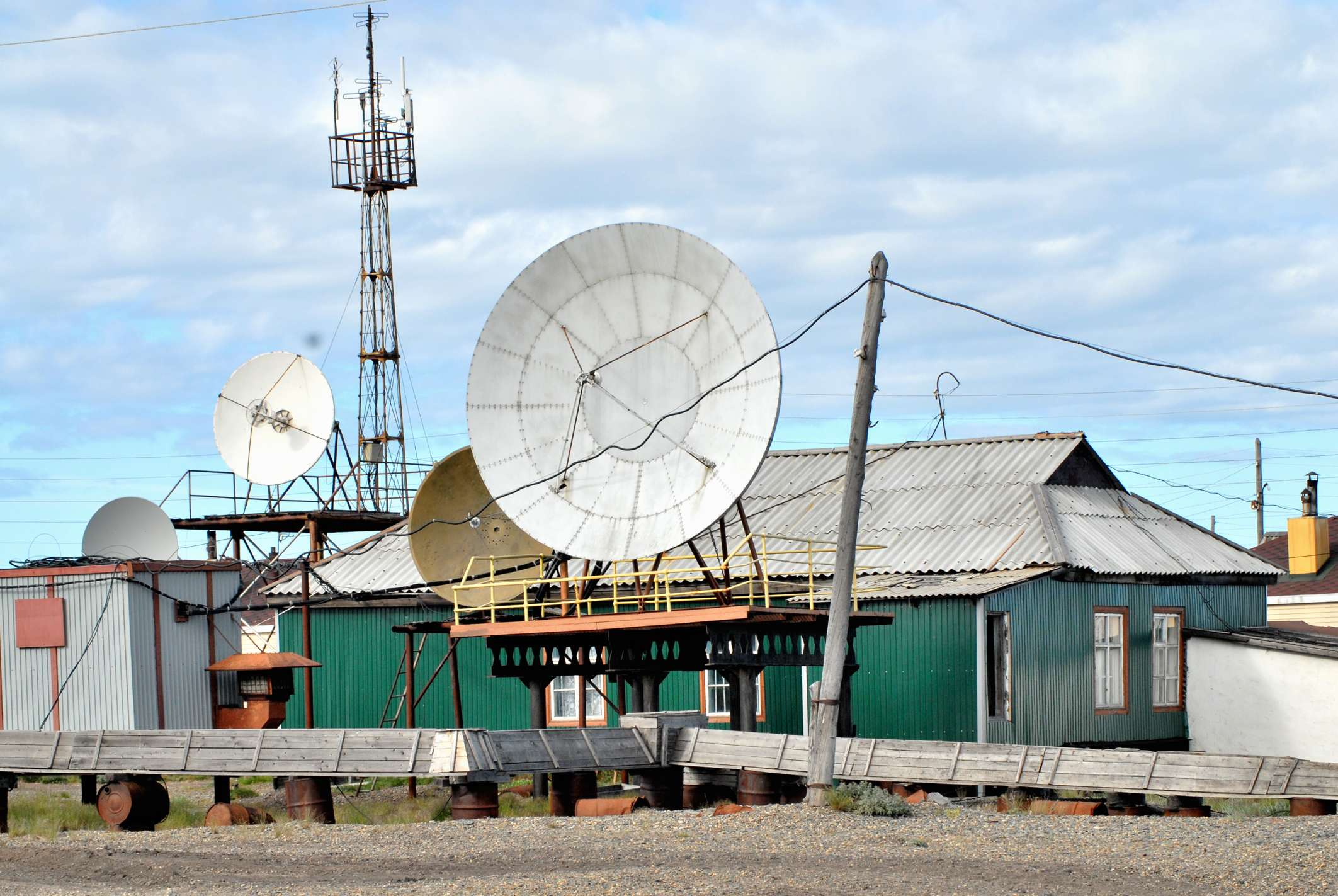
Vankarem,
telecommunication center

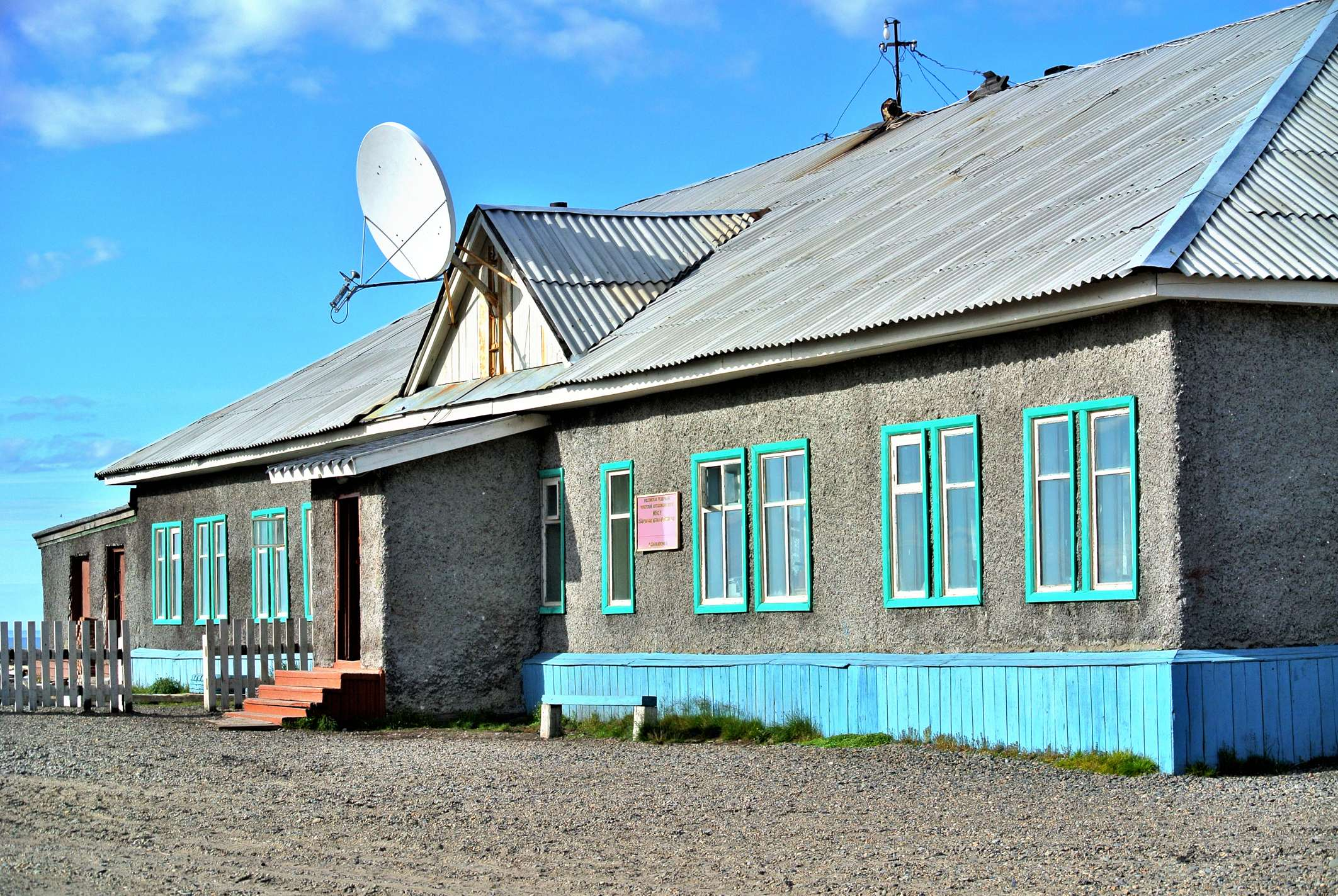
Vankarem,
schoolhouse

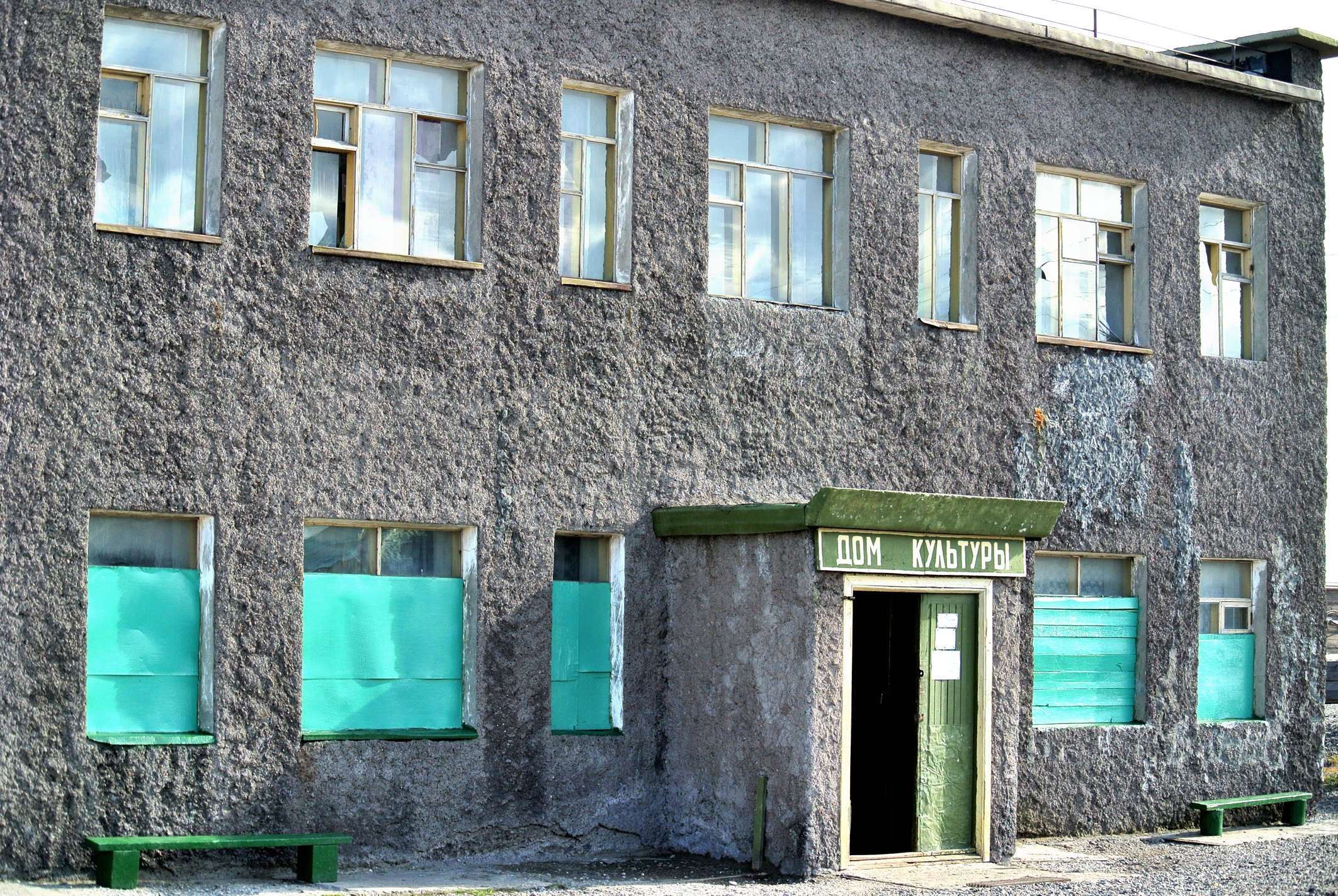
Vankarem,
house of culture

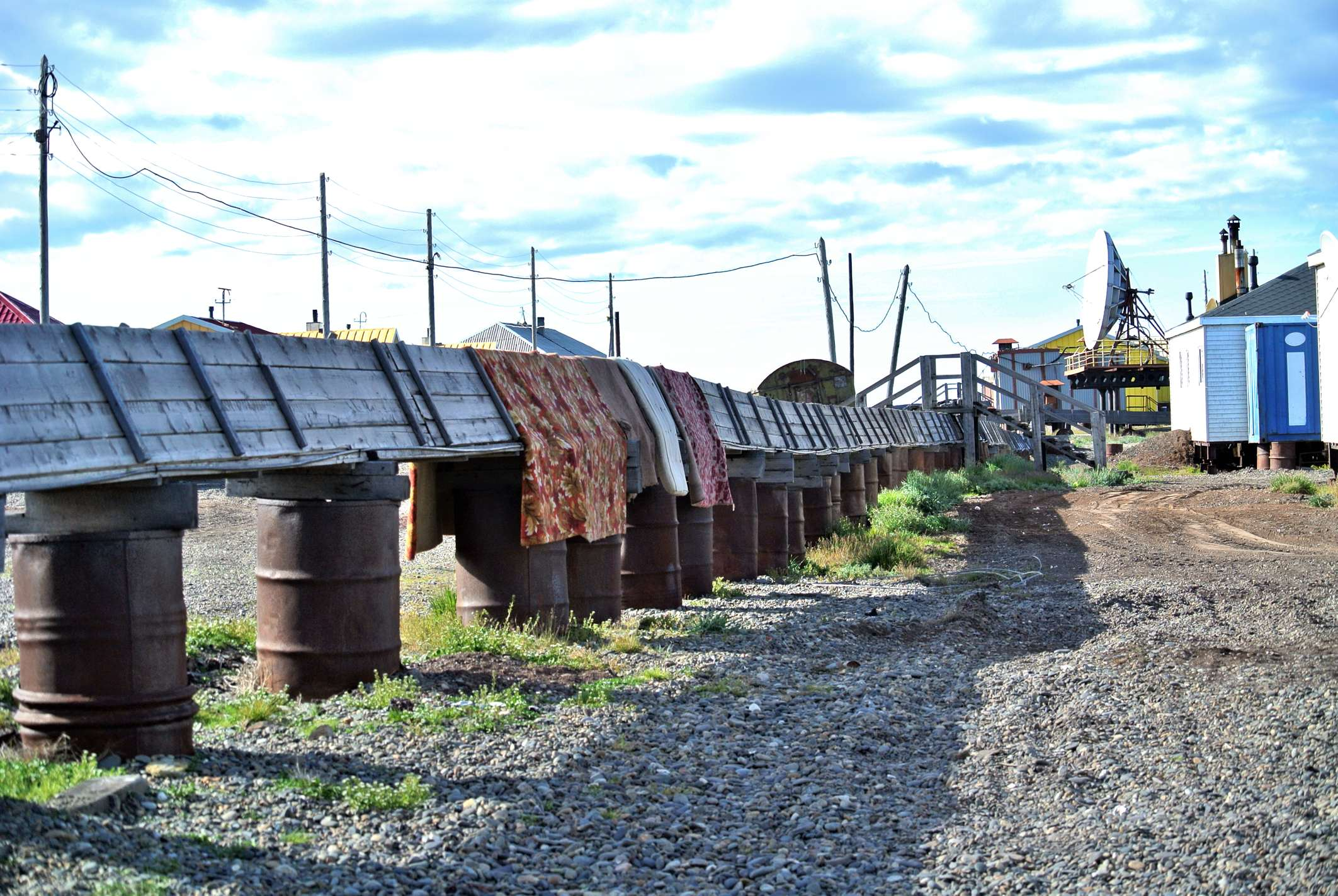
Vankarem,
district heating pipe

== See also ==
- List of inhabited localities in Iultinsky District
