= Cape Yakan =

Headland in Chukotka, Russian Federation

Cape Yakan Мыс Якан
- Cape
- Coordinates: 69°35′31″N 177°28′15″E
- Location: Chukotka, Russia
- Offshore water bodies: East Siberian Sea, Chukchi Sea

Area
  - Total: Russian Far East
- Elevation: 50 m

Cape Yakan (Russian: Мыс Якан – Mys Yakan) is a headland on the northern coast of Chukotka, Russian Federation. This conspicuous cape, whose name in the Chukchi language means "use", was mentioned by Adolf Erik Nordenskiöld in his Vega Expedition.

== Geography ==
Cape Yakan is located in the Long Strait area, west of Cape Schmidt and about 65 km to the east of Cape Billings near the mouth of the Ekaenmyvaam River. It is also a geographic landmark separating the East Siberian Sea from the Chukchi Sea. The cape is a rocky headland between 40 and 50 metres high.

== Wildlife ==
There is a large colony of black-legged kittiwakes on the cape's cliffs, as well as smaller colonies of guillemots. Cape Yakan is also a nesting ground for the peregrine falcon or duck hawk.

== See also ==
- Jeannette Expedition
