= Cape Vankarem =

Cape in Chukotka Autonomous Okrug, Russia

Cape Vankarem мыс Ванкарем
- Cape
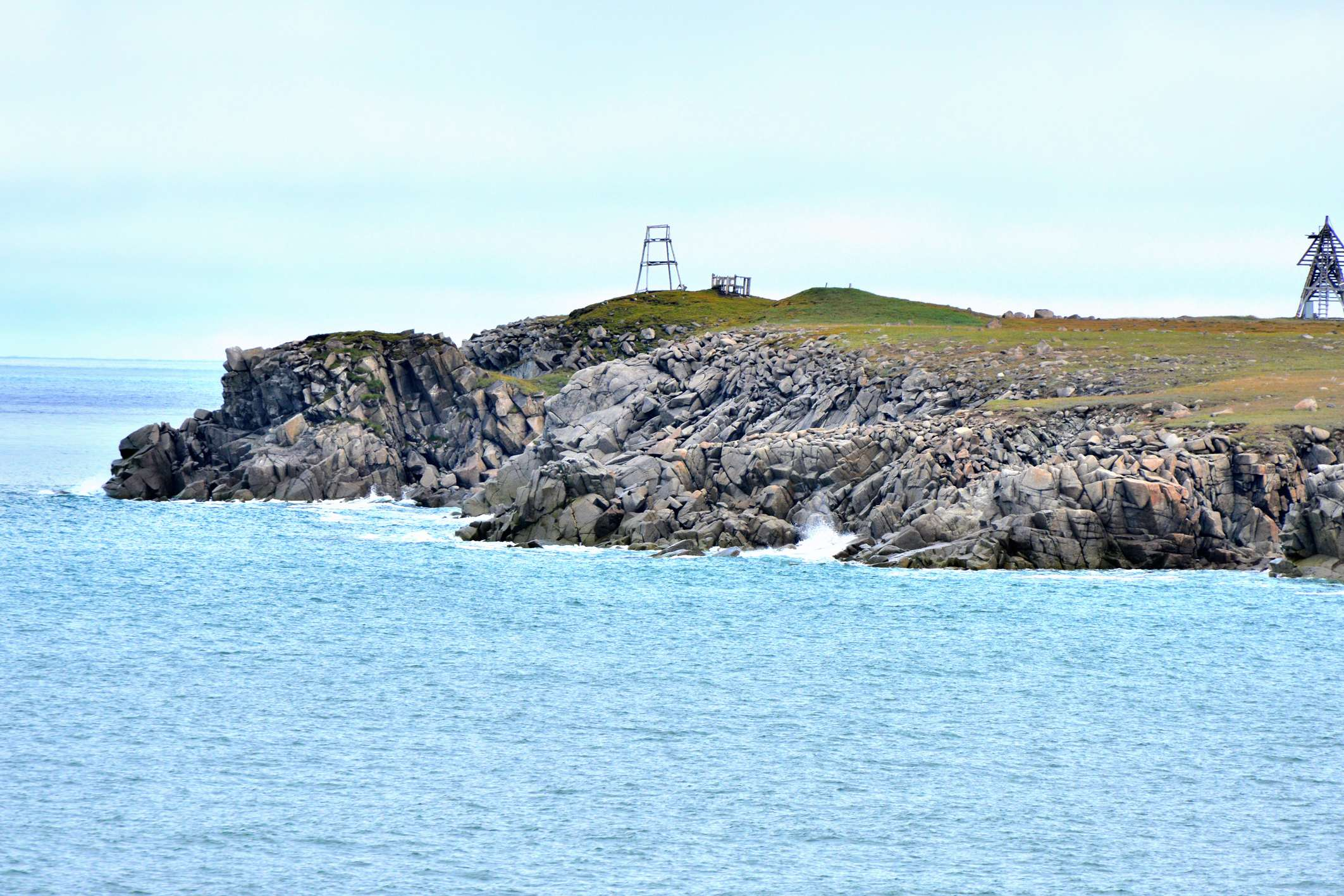
- View of Cape Vankarem

- Coordinates: 67°50′55″N 175°48′24″W
- Location: Chukotka, Russia
- Offshore water bodies: Chukchi Sea

Cape Vankarem is a cape in the Chukchi Sea on the northern coast of Chukotka between Cape Schmidt to the west and Kolyuchinskaya Bay to the east. It projects from a sandspit across the mouth of a lagoon into which flows the Vankarem River. At the mouth of the lagoon is the village of Vankarem, a Chukchi settlement.

The area around cape Vankarem is bounded by narrow beach ridges and swales with numerous inlets and coastal lagoons.

== History ==
East of Cape Vankarem, Adolf Erik Nordenskiöld observed remains of ancient dwellings, as well as numerous bones of reindeers and bears. Walruses, and whales, including bowhead and gray whales, are abundant in the waters off Cape Vankarem.

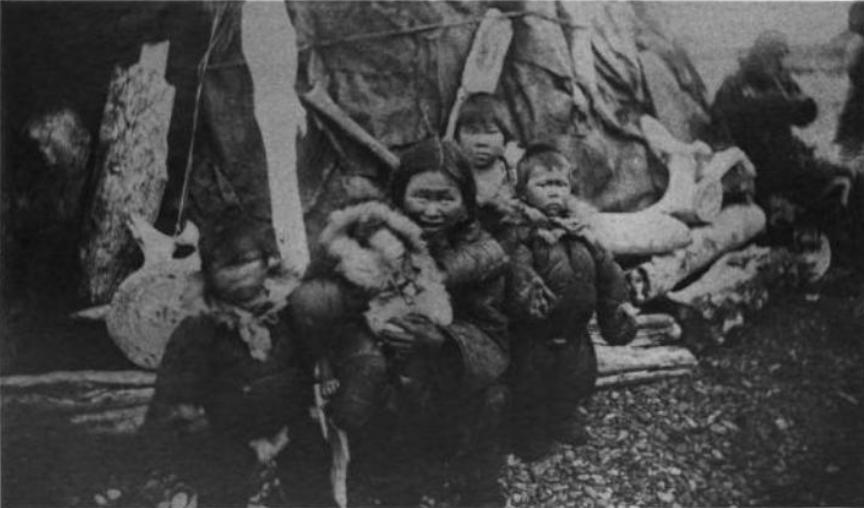
Small children and mother in front of a yaranga at Cape Vankarem in 1881. Picture by Edward William Nelson

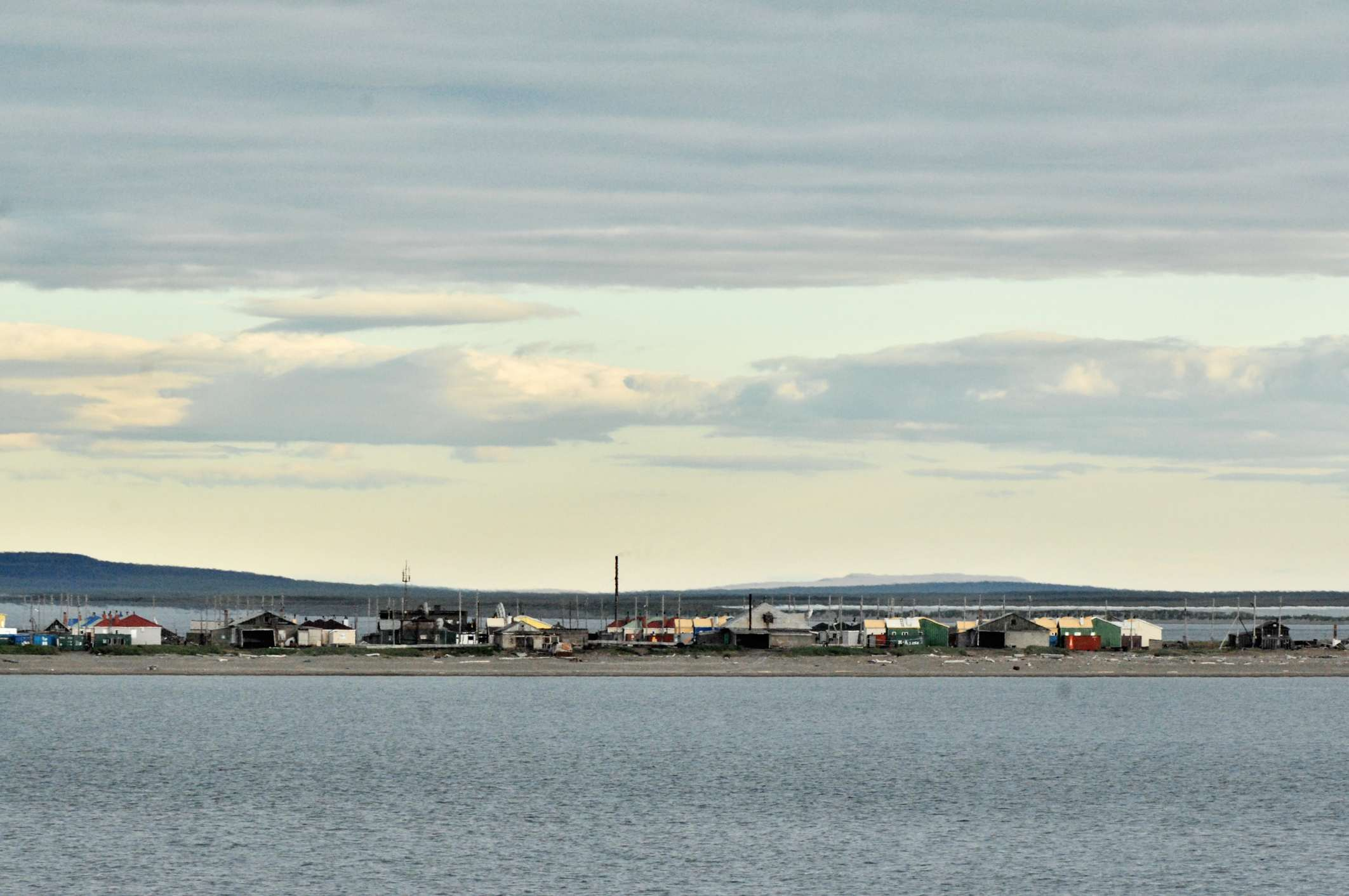
Vankarem village in July 2013

== Climate ==
Climate data for Cape Vankarem (extremes 1934-present)
Month	Jan	Feb	Mar	Apr	May	Jun	Jul	Aug	Sep	Oct	Nov	Dec	Year
Record high °C (°F)	1.7 (35.1)	0.8 (33.4)	3.1 (37.6)	3.7 (38.7)	13.7 (56.7)	25.2 (77.4)	27.1 (80.8)	27.4 (81.3)	19.4 (66.9)	11.5 (52.7)	10.5 (50.9)	3.3 (37.9)	27.4 (81.3)
Mean daily maximum °C (°F)	−21.2 (−6.2)	−21.0 (−5.8)	−18.5 (−1.3)	−12.1 (10.2)	−1.5 (29.3)	6.5 (43.7)	9.6 (49.3)	7.3 (45.1)	5.0 (41.0)	−0.9 (30.4)	−7.6 (18.3)	−16.6 (2.1)	−5.9 (21.3)
Daily mean °C (°F)	−24.1 (−11.4)	−24.3 (−11.7)	−22.2 (−8.0)	−15.8 (3.6)	−4.2 (24.4)	2.9 (37.2)	5.4 (41.7)	4.2 (39.6)	3.0 (37.4)	−2.7 (27.1)	−10.4 (13.3)	−19.2 (−2.6)	−9.0 (15.9)
Mean daily minimum °C (°F)	−26.9 (−16.4)	−27.4 (−17.3)	−25.6 (−14.1)	−19.3 (−2.7)	−6.8 (19.8)	0.3 (32.5)	2.6 (36.7)	2.0 (35.6)	1.5 (34.7)	−4.6 (23.7)	−13.3 (8.1)	−21.9 (−7.4)	−11.6 (11.1)
Record low °C (°F)	−44.9 (−48.8)	−46.5 (−51.7)	−44.6 (−48.3)	−40.1 (−40.2)	−28.0 (−18.4)	−11.6 (11.1)	−3.9 (25.0)	−5.0 (23.0)	−14.4 (6.1)	−29.0 (−20.2)	−36.3 (−33.3)	−41.4 (−42.5)	−46.5 (−51.7)
Average precipitation mm (inches)	10.9 (0.43)	10.3 (0.41)	6.9 (0.27)	8.6 (0.34)	7.9 (0.31)	6.2 (0.24)	13.6 (0.54)	20.5 (0.81)	18.0 (0.71)	31.5 (1.24)	22.7 (0.89)	14.6 (0.57)	171.7 (6.76)
Source: pogoda.ru.net

== See also ==
- Captain Vladimir Voronin
