= Cape Billings =

Headland in Chukotka, Russian Federation

Cape Billings Мыс Биллингса
- Cape
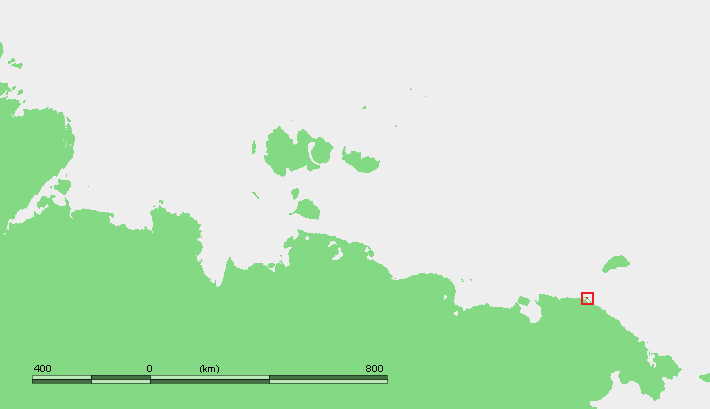
- Location of Cape Billings

- Coordinates: 69°51′0″N 176°8′0″E
- Location: Chukotka, Russia
- Offshore water bodies: East Siberian Sea

Area
  - Total: Russian Far East

Cape Billings (Russian: Мыс Биллингса - Mys Billingsa), is a headland on the northern coast of Chukotka, Russian Federation to the west of Cape Schmidt.

== Geography ==
The shore in the area around Cape Billings is bounded by narrow sandspits, beach ridges and swales enclosing a series of coastal inshore lagoons, with the Long Strait lies north of this headland. The Chukchi settlement of Billings, is located close to the cape. There is a curious series of linked oval lakes of decreasing size along the shore towards west from the cape. Cape Yakan is located about 65 km to the east of Cape Billings.

== Climate ==
Cape Billings has a Tundra climate (ET) because the warmest month has an average temperature between 0 °C (32 °F) and 10 °C (50 °F).

Climate data for Cape Billings (Climate ID:25062)
Month	Jan	Feb	Mar	Apr	May	Jun	Jul	Aug	Sep	Oct	Nov	Dec	Year
Record high °C (°F)	7.8 (46.0)	5.5 (41.9)	6.2 (43.2)	9.1 (48.4)	12.8 (55.0)	24.6 (76.3)	29.0 (84.2)	25.5 (77.9)	18.1 (64.6)	10.9 (51.6)	5.2 (41.4)	6.0 (42.8)	29.0 (84.2)
Mean daily maximum °C (°F)	−22.7 (−8.9)	−22.8 (−9.0)	−19.9 (−3.8)	−12.5 (9.5)	−1.8 (28.8)	5.5 (41.9)	8.1 (46.6)	7.2 (45.0)	3.6 (38.5)	−3.7 (25.3)	−11.6 (11.1)	−19.2 (−2.6)	−7.5 (18.5)
Daily mean °C (°F)	−26.0 (−14.8)	−26.1 (−15.0)	−23.6 (−10.5)	−16.5 (2.3)	−4.8 (23.4)	2.2 (36.0)	4.4 (39.9)	4.1 (39.4)	1.4 (34.5)	−6.2 (20.8)	−15.0 (5.0)	−22.4 (−8.3)	−10.7 (12.7)
Mean daily minimum °C (°F)	−29.4 (−20.9)	−29.4 (−20.9)	−27.0 (−16.6)	−20.3 (−4.5)	−7.7 (18.1)	−0.2 (31.6)	1.9 (35.4)	2.1 (35.8)	−0.3 (31.5)	−8.6 (16.5)	−18.5 (−1.3)	−25.8 (−14.4)	−13.6 (7.5)
Record low °C (°F)	−49.3 (−56.7)	−50.7 (−59.3)	−45.3 (−49.5)	−40.6 (−41.1)	−33.8 (−28.8)	−13 (9)	−3.9 (25.0)	−6.1 (21.0)	−16.3 (2.7)	−33.9 (−29.0)	−40.4 (−40.7)	−45.4 (−49.7)	−50.7 (−59.3)
Average precipitation mm (inches)	9.4 (0.37)	9.3 (0.37)	7.1 (0.28)	9.3 (0.37)	11.0 (0.43)	12.7 (0.50)	25.1 (0.99)	27.3 (1.07)	24.2 (0.95)	23.7 (0.93)	19.9 (0.78)	12.3 (0.48)	191.3 (7.52)
Source: Roshydromet

== Wildlife ==
The Fuzzy hermit crab (Pagurus trigonocheirus) inhabits the waters off Cape Billings.

== Etymology ==
This cape was named after British Captain Joseph Billings (1758–1806) who was at the service of the Russian Imperial Navy during Empress Catherine II of Russia's reign.
