= Long Strait =

Short body of water in the arctic

- пролив Лонга (Russian)
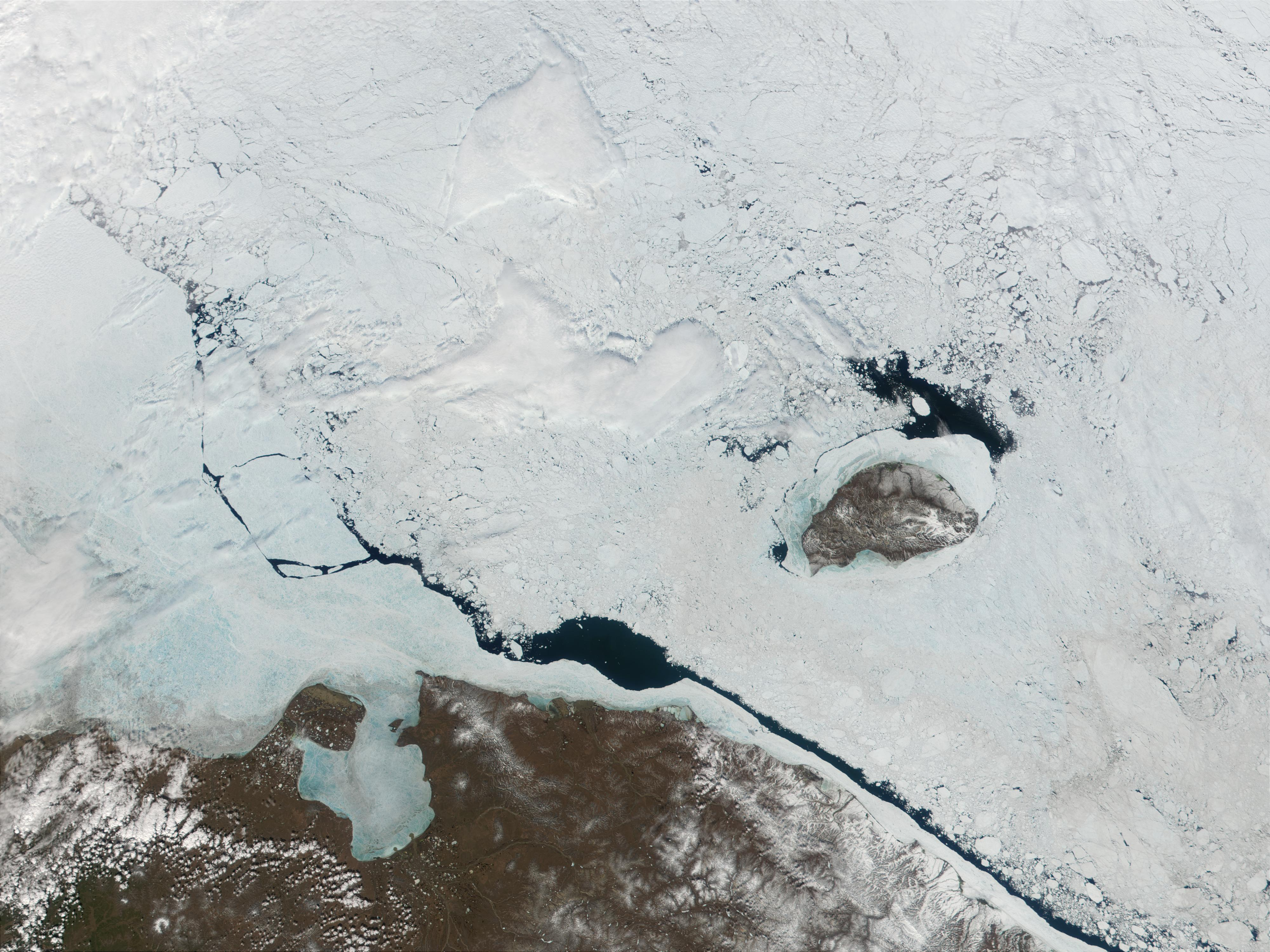
- A view from space, with a long polynya in the strait and Wrangel Island to the north-east

- Location in Russia
- Location: Russian Far East; between the East Siberian Sea and the Chukchi Sea
- Coordinates: 69°49′N 176°10′E
- Part of: Arctic Ocean
- Basin countries: Russia
- Max. length: 128 km (80 mi)
- Max. width: 141 km (88 mi)
- Max. depth: 50 m (160 ft)
- Frozen: Most of the year

The Long Strait (Russian: пролив Лонга; Proliv Longa) is a body of water in the Russian Federation.

== History ==
This strait was named after the American whaling captain Thomas W. Long.

In August 1983, it was the site of a disaster when 50 ships were trapped in ice, with the loss of one and damage to as many as 30 others.

== Geography ==
This strait separates Wrangel Island from the Siberian mainland. It is very broad, its minimum width being 141 km, between Cape Blossom at the southwestern tip of Wrangel Island and Cape Yakan, 65 km east of Cape Billings, close to Gytkhelen, Chukotka.

The Long Strait is also a geographic landmark connecting the East Siberian Sea and the Chukchi Sea.
