= Nikolai Kamanin =

Soviet aviator (1908–1982)

Nikolai Petrovich Kamanin
- Никола́й Петро́вич Кама́нин
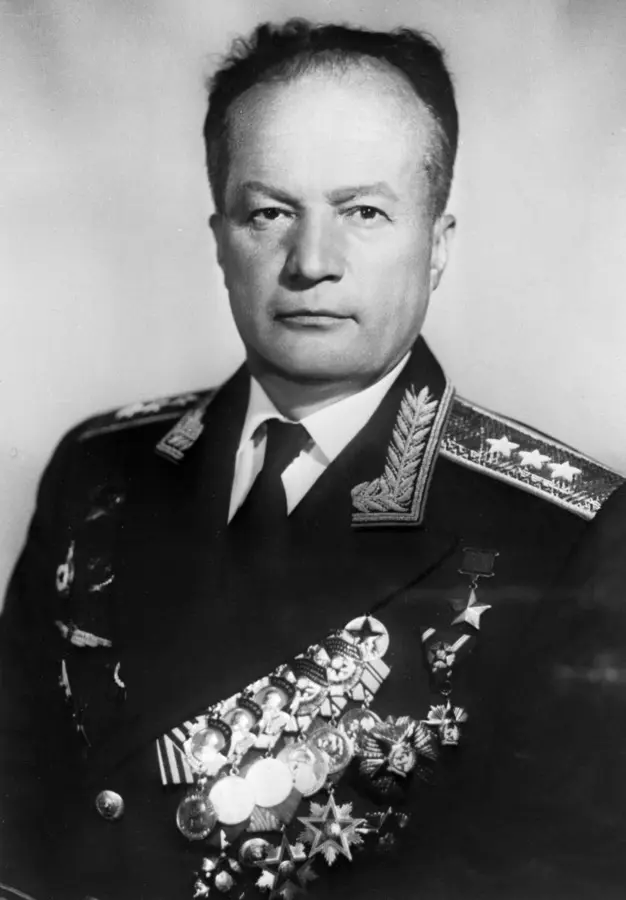
- Born: 18 October 1908; Melenki, Vladimir Governorate, Russia
- Died: 11 March 1982 (aged 73); Moscow, Soviet Union
- Military career
- Allegiance: Soviet Union
- Branch: Red Army; Soviet Air Forces
- Service years: 1927–1972
- Rank: Colonel General
- Awards: Hero of the Soviet Union
- Other work: Soviet space program, head of cosmonaut training

Signature
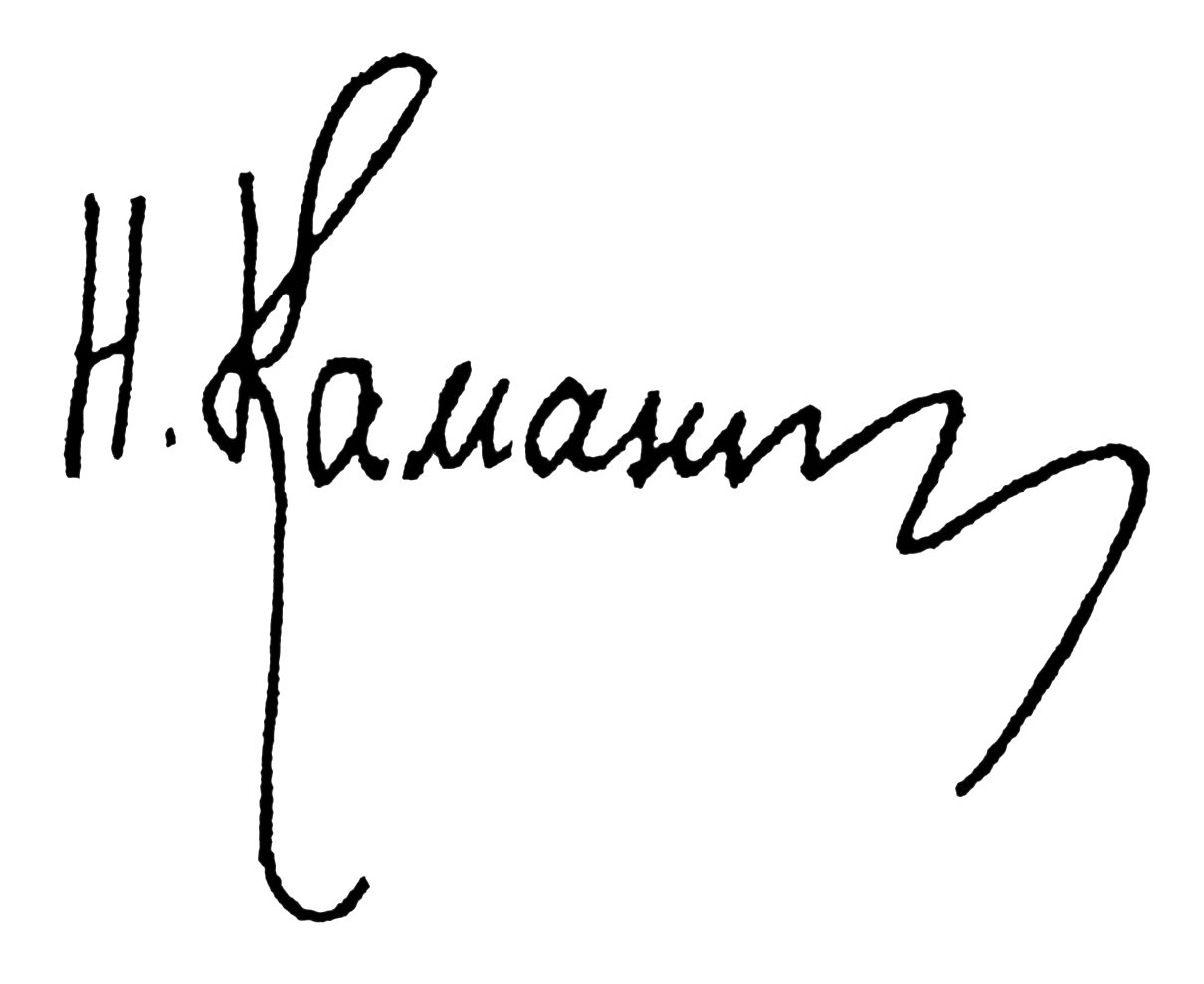

Nikolai Petrovich Kamanin (Russian: Никола́й Петро́вич Кама́нин; 18 October 1908 – 11 March 1982) was a Soviet Air Force general and a program manager in the Soviet space program. A career aviator, he was awarded the title of Hero of the Soviet Union in 1934 for the rescue of SS Chelyuskin crew from an improvised airfield on the frozen surface of the Chukchi Sea near Kolyuchin Island.

In World War II he successfully commanded an air brigade, air division, and air corps, reaching the rank of Airforce Colonel General and Air Army commander after the war. It was at this time that his son, Arkady Kamanin, became a fighter pilot at the age of 14, the youngest military pilot in world history.

From 1960 to 1971, General Kamanin was the program manager of the cosmonaut training in the Soviet space program. He recruited and trained the first generation of cosmonauts, including Yuri Gagarin, Valentina Tereshkova, Gherman Titov and Alexei Leonov. Kamanin was the Soviet Air Force representative to the space program, a proponent of crewed orbital flight and air force influence over the Space Race. His diaries of this period, published from 1995 to 2001, are among the most important sources documenting the progress of the Soviet space program.

== Early life ==
Nikolai Kamanin was born in Melenki, in Vladimir Governorate (now Melenkovsky District, Vladimir Oblast). Kamanin's grandfather was a wealthy shoemaker with his own workshop; however, his father, Pyotr Kamanin, broke with tradition and joined the Bolsheviks. He died in 1919 at the age of 49; mother, Stefanida Danilovna (1876–1964) lived all her life in Melenki. Stefanida and Pyotr Kamanin had 10 children; Nikolai survived all his four brothers. Alexander Ivanovich Kamanin, Nikolai's uncle, lived a very long life, including 50 years of religious hermitage, and had a reputation of a holy elder.

According to his son, Lev Kamanin, Nikolai Kamanin was actually born in 1909 and changed it to 1908 to cheat the Army admission staff when he volunteered in 1927. He passed the airforce physical test and completed the pilots' school in Borisoglebsk in 1929, trained by legendary pilot Victor Kholzunov. Kamanin was dispatched to the site of Russo-Chinese railroad conflict in the Far East, arriving one day after ceasefire. There, he joined the legendary Lenin Air Regiment, the first air force unit in Soviet history. Kamanin flew a two-seater reconnaissance airplane, including 11-hour endurance flights over the Sea of Japan. His crewmate, incidentally, was an ethnic Chinese.

== Chelyuskin rescue ==
In February 1934, the steamship SS Chelyuskin was crushed by Arctic ice in the Chukchi Sea. The surviving 104 crewmembers and passengers set their base on pack ice. At that time, the United States grounded all Arctic flights after a string of accidents, and the only rescue force on hand was Anatoly Liapidevsky and his ANT-4 crew. After 28 failed attempts, Liapidevski located the ice camp on 5 March, landed and hauled out twelve of 104 survivors. A week later, on the second flight to ice camp, he crash-landed the airplane after an engine failure. The operation stalled. The Soviet government dispatched three groups of pilots from Far Eastern air bases.

The largest group of seven military and civilian reconnaissance pilots on Polikarpov R-5 biplanes, based in Primorsky Krai, was led by Kamanin (he later grounded one of the pilots for insubordination). The group sailed from Vladivostok 2 March 1934, disembarked at Olyutorka and landed at Vankarem airfield 1 April. Kamanin and Vasily Molokov flew from a temporary base in Vankarem settlement to the ice camp, saving 34 and 39 survivors. On their first flight from the ice camp, R-5 (designed as a two-seater) carried a crew of two, plus two men from Chelyuskin in the hull. The next flights added makeshift wing gondolas, carrying two more men per mission. Other pilots from the Kamanin team hauled them from Vankarem to Providence Bay seaport. The ice camp was completely evacuated 13 April 1934; Kamanin returned with the ship's bosun and eight riding dogs.

The next day, six pilots that flew to the ice camp and back (including Kamanin) and Sigizmund Levanevsky were announced as the first Heroes of the Soviet Union. Pilots who ferried survivors from Vankarem to Providence received the Order of the Red Star.

== World War II ==
=== Occupation of Iran ===
In 1939, Kamanin completed training at Zhukovsky Airforce Academy. Prior to his front-line assignments, Colonel Kamanin held a staff role in Central Asia, setting up 17 training facilities and shaping up fresh air force units. On 25 August 1941, in agreement with the United Kingdom, Soviet troops crossed the border with Iran, eventually taking control over the northern part of this country. Kamanin's air brigade provided logistical and reconnaissance support for this operation. On 20 July 1942, Kamanin was summoned to Moscow to organize, train and lead the newly conceived 292nd Ground Attack Air Division (292 штурмовая дивизия, 292 шад).

=== Division Commander: Rzhev, Demyansk ===
On 25 July 1942, Kamanin arrived at his new command, only to find orders that the division had to send its fully manned, combat-ready aviation regiments to the front. The division was given new units only in September 1942, including the 800th, 820th and 667th Attack Aviation Regiments equipped with Ilyushin Il-2, and 427th Fighter Aviation Regiment equipped with Yakovlev Yak-1 fighters.

On 16 October 1942, in the days of the Battle of Stalingrad the division was assigned to front-line airfields near Andreapol, Tver Oblast and subordinated to Mikhail Gromov's Third Air Army targeted against Rzhev and Smolensk. The division entered combat 29 October. Kamanin's first personal combat sortie in World War II occurred 28 December 1942, against Velikiye Luki railroad station. The division was engaged in the Battle of Velikiye Luki and Second Rzhev-Sychevka Offensive, which ended in German evacuation of Rzhev bridgeheads at an enormous cost to the Red Army. The 292nd Division, credited with saving the Soviet offensive at Bely, Tver Oblast (8 December) and other tactical successes, was slowly bleeding, losing 20 pilots and 35 aircraft in two months, with no replenishments until January 1943. The refitted division served against Demyansk Pocket, 15–23 February 1943. On 1 March 1943, Kamanin was summoned to Moscow again and passed command of 292nd Division to Filipp Agaltsov, future Marshal of Aviation.

=== Corps Commander: Kursk ===
Kamanin, promoted to major general on 18 May 1943, took command of 8th Combined Air Corps. The corps contained two ground attack divisions: 212th, later Fourth Guards (commander Colonel Georgiy Baidukov) and 264th (commander Colonel Evgeny Klobukov), the latter manned with inexperienced pilots. One of the seasoned pilots was Georgi Beregovoi, flying the IL-2 since 1941. The third unit, 256th Pursuit Division, was in the formation stage. All units needed extensive training; however, instead of 400 tons of petrol required, Kamanin could only secure 40 tons. Another shipment of 200 tons provided 4-5 training sorties for young pilots. This brief round of training was interrupted by a fatal accident that revealed structural defects in their IL-2 fleet, and required modifications to correct the defects.

On 21 May 1943, the corps relocated south, near Liski, Voronezh Oblast. Across the front line, German troops were concentrating for the Battle of Kursk. The corps was subordinate to the newly organized Steppe Front, a strategic reserve force behind the main Soviet line around Kursk. At the end of the German offensive against Kursk, it was renamed Fifth Ground Attack Corps and dispatched to the front-line Second Air Army, targeted at capturing Belgorod. Their first combat sortie occurred at 11:00, 23 July 1943, in preparation for Operation Rumyantsev (3–23 August). On 16 August 1943, the corps suffered its worse losses ever, losing 15 planes in one day. Soon, in the action around Kharkiv, Kamanin's corps, notably Beregovoy's unit, excelled in anti-tank warfare using new PTAB anti-tank bomblets.

=== Advancing over Ukraine ===
Throughout 1943, the corps followed advancing troops in Ukraine, but its actions were limited by fuel and ammunition rationing. In the beginning of Battle of the Dnieper, the Corps could only dispatch two active regiments to Bukrin bridgehead; the rest was grounded by fuel shortage. The situation improved when the direction of the Soviet offensive switched to Lyutezh bridgehead. Kamanin earned the Order of Suvorov for his corp's achievement in the Battle of Kiev (1943). This was followed by action against Korsun-Cherkassy Pocket in January–February 1944 and subsequent Kamenets-Podolsky pocket in March–April.

In spring 1944, Kamanin obtained permission to fly personal missions in enemy territory and was engaged in deep reconnaissance of the Lviv area with Lieutenant Pyotr Schmigol (Hero of the Soviet Union, 1944). This information paved the road to the Lvov-Sandomierz Offensive of July 1944.

=== Raid on Lviv ===
Lviv was defended by an estimated force of 700 German aircraft. Shortly before the battle, Ivan Konev prohibited any ground action until the air force provided reliable data on enemy formations. Instead, Kamanin proposed a combination of night-time reconnaissance with a major ground attack by IL-2 units. This plan was originally considered doomed to failure, since the IL-2 was never intended for night flight, and very few Sturmovik pilots had night flight experience. Technicians modified IL-2 exhaust pipes so that exhaust would not blind pilots completely, but otherwise the operation remained a high risk. Thus, Kamanin planned to take off at night, arrive over Lviv airfields early at dusk and return after dusk.

The first group to arrive at Lviv airfield - six Yak fighters - prevented takeoff of German defence fighters. Another group of 12 fighters patrolled along the return route. The first attack unit of eight IL-2's, protected by eight fighters, attacked the German airplanes on the ground in a 1300-meter dive. This was followed by the main force of IL-2 bombers, arriving in groups of four.

The Soviet formation of 34 fighters and 24 attack planes lost 3 airplanes. Kamanin estimated German losses at 30 twin-engined airplanes and one Focke-Wulf Fw 190 (of the 150 aircraft presumed to be on the ground) plus warehouses and other materiel. The same night, similar strikes at three other airfields effectively crippled German resistance in the air.

After completion of Lviv-Sandomierz operation, Kamanin was awarded the Order of Kutuzov.

=== Budapest to Prague ===
In September 1944, Romania changed sides and turned against Germany (see Battle of Romania (1944)). Romanian air corps, led by General Ionescu, was temporarily placed under Kamanin's command. Kamanin admitted it was a strong, well-trained force of 170 aircraft (mostly, modern German types), and the Romanians proved themselves as capable aviators.

Meanwhile, Kamanin's own force was heavily engaged over Tisza valley, flying 150-200 sorties daily, paving the road to Budapest. In December 1944, his regiments relocated to an extremely dangerous position - airfields only 10-12 kilometers behind the front line. This was, however, the only solution that could enable effective support of ground troops after an all-out offensive was launched 20 December 1944. This day, the corps flew over 1000 sorties. Kamanin's corps operations in the Battle of Budapest were limited mostly by the physical state of dirt airfields (other formations, based farther from the front line, were also limited by long approach distances). The new position happened to be placed directly on the axis of German Operation Konrad, and was key in tying up this counteroffensive.

=== Arkady Kamanin ===
Arkady Kamanin, Nikolai's son, was born in 1928. He spent most of his childhood on the airfields and at an early age could identify most of the Soviet military airplanes by the engine's sound alone. After the outbreak of the Great Patriotic War, Arkady worked at one of the aircraft plants in Moscow. Later in 1941, he was evacuated to Tashkent with his mother and younger brother Leo, where they lived until the spring of 1943. In the middle of spring of 1943 he arrived at Andreapol airfield (Kalininsky battlefront), where his father's air division was quartering. Formally enlisted at the age of 14, Arkady served as a mechanic at a liaison squadron, where he learned practical flying skills by hitchhiking rides with real pilots, whom he asked to let him steer. After he managed to land a Polikarpov Po-2 by himself when the pilot was wounded by shrapnel, he passed the official examinations for piloting the Po-2, becoming the youngest pilot of World War II at the age of 15. Soon after that he was granted his personal Po-2 with forked lightning painted on fuselage. On one of these flights, Arkady managed to save the wounded Lieutenant Berdnikov, who crash-landed his damaged IL-2 near the front line, while retrieving the plane's reconnaissance film and returning safely to the base. For his excellent service, Arkady Kamanin received two combat Orders of the Red Star, the Order of the Red Banner, the Medal "For the Victory over Germany in the Great Patriotic War 1941–1945", the Medal "For the Capture of Budapest" and the Medal "For the Capture of Vienna". After the war Arkady decided to enter the Zhukovsky Air Force Engineering Academy, wanting to learn to fly new types of aircraft. Arkady Kamanin died of meningitis on April 13, 1947, at the age of 18.

== Space program ==
Kamanin completed the General Staff Academy in 1956 and commanded the air force of Central Asian district for three years. In 1960, Chief Marshal of Aviation Konstantin Vershinin assigned Kamanin to the Soviet space program as the military chief of the crewed orbital flight program. His formal title was Deputy Chief of Combat Training for Space (Russian: заместитель начальника боевой подготовки ВВС по космосу), formally a step down from his previous roles of First Deputy to Air Force Chief of Staff and Air Army Commander. Kamanin was assisted by major general and Hero of Soviet Union Leonid Goreglyad, Colonel Boris Aristov (a skilled navigator with 232 combat sorties experience), and other notable war pilots. The Center for Cosmonaut Training (present-day Star City, Russia) was initially led by Colonel Karpov, Kamanin's subordinate.

=== Preparation for crewed flight ===
Kamanin's diaries, first published in 1995, began on 17 December 1960, and explained the development of the Soviet crewed program and related internal politics. The diaries present at least four sides of his activities prior to Yuri Gagarin's flight, all of which continued until Kamanin's retirement:

Coordination of design bureaus developing life support systems for crewed spaceflight: spacesuits, parachutes, air regeneration etc. Kamanin's diaries present hims as a risk-taker, willing to go forward with incomplete systems to beat the Americans to orbit. Later, when the space programs focused on fully automatic controls, Kamanin asserted his viewpoint in favor of human controls. At the same time, during 1962 discussions on flight duration, he was always on the conservative side, voting for no more than two day spaceflights.

Tracking, search and recovery of landed craft, coordination and refinement of search and rescue efforts. For example, 9 March 1961, the Vostok 3A prototype flew a flawless mission. The capsule with Chernushka and Ivan Ivanovich landed in an open field near Stary Tokmak. Kamanin and Vladimir Yazdovsky arrived on site, encircled by curious villagers, and arranged recovery of the craft. The tracking network was considerably expanded after 1965, with a special naval group and installations in Cuba.

Management of cosmonaut training squad, probably the least time-consuming activity, started with selection of Air Force Group I in March 1960. Between 17–18 January 1961, Kamanin chaired the Examination Committee that evaluated the first six cosmonauts prepared for the Vostok program. Kamanin rated Yuri Gagarin, Gherman Titov and Grigori Nelyubov as the best candidates. He personally developed the cosmonaut flying manual and training schedule, traveled across landing areas with flight candidates and supervised last-minute training at Baikonur. Kamanin also campaigned for early disclosure of Soviet launches, as soon as the craft is in orbit, against Vershinin's original opinion. Kamanin's view was upheld 29 March when the state commission approved the first crewed launch.

Commissioner for all other space launches, including the first interplanetary space probes. He was skeptical about the value of these probes: "Venus launch is hardly a sensible endeavor: it delays crewed flight and decreases Rocket Force battle-readiness" ("Пуск на Венеру - затея едва ли разумная: она задерживает полет человека и снижает боеспособность ракетных войск"). Indeed, the first Venus mission failed - the Venera spacecraft was trapped in Earth's orbit. The second Venera, launched 12 February 1961, missed its target by 100,000 kilometers, which was a success for 1961 technology.

=== Gagarin's flight ===
By 5 April 1961, Kamanin was still indecisive, ranking Gagarin and Titov equally fit for the flight. Three days later, he recommended Gagarin, with Titov as backup. After the final training session (afternoon, 11 April), Kamanin parted with Yuri Gagarin. The next day, Gagarin lifted off in Vostok 1, made a full orbit and safely landed 23 kilometers from Saratov. Kamanin left mission control 20 minutes after launch, as soon as Gagarin reported that he is safe in orbit, and rushed to Stalingrad in an Antonov An-12 transport. Still airborne, Kamanin received a radio message that Gagarin had landed safely and was flown to Kuybyshev airport. Later, in 1966, he recorded that "As odd as it may seem, Gagarin's flight was the safest. Voskhod 2 was the most dangerous to date" ("Как это ни странно звучит, но самым надежным у нас был полет Гагарина. Самым опасным до настоящего времени являлся полет "Восхода-2").

=== Public relations ===
On 14 April, Kamanin accompanied Gagarin on his triumphant ride into Red Square and was the publicity mentor of Soviet cosmonauts until his retirement. In May–September 1961, Gagarin and Kamanin performed a world publicity tour, reaching countries like Iceland and Brazil.

This was followed by a near disaster in Crimea. For the first time, Kamanin reported Gagarin and Titov having serious personal problems, and attempted to repair their discipline and motivation. On 4 October 1961, Gagarin injured his head in a bizarre jump from a balcony, ending up in a hospital and failing to attend the opening of 22nd Communist Party Congress. This was a political blow to the air force, and Kamanin personally; Kamanin had to concentrate on politics to restore his former influence. On 20 October. the United States media, curious why Gagarin missed the Congress, started its own inquiries and speculations; Kamanin was called to intervene. On 24 October, Gagarin, bearing fresh evidence of plastic surgery on his torn eyebrow, made a brief appearance at the Congress; he later explained the scar as a routine tourist accident.

In December 1961, Gagarin and Kamanin flew on another tour, this time to India, Sri Lanka, and Afghanistan. Later, Kamanin had to persuade Vershinin to let him stay at home and concentrate on real work instead of meeting foreign dignitaries. He, however, appreciated the results of the United States tour (28 April - 12 May 1962), and the practical information released by John Glenn and Alan Shepard.

Another particularly challenging campaign followed the flight of Voskhod 1. Three cosmonauts landed 13 October 1964, the day when Nikita Khrushchev was ousted from power. Their triumphant return was compromised by uncertainty with new Soviet leadership and the accidental death of Marshal Sergey Biryuzov (19 October).

=== Women in space ===
Kamanin campaigned for training and launching women cosmonauts since Gagarin's flight, but the subsequent publicity assignments separated him from decision-making. However, on 25 December the Soviet government authorized selection of a second group of 60 trainees, including women. By the end of January 1962, Kamanin collected 58 women's resumes and picked 23 who still had to pass the physical tests. On 12 March, a group of five women was picked for active training; on 29 March he identified Valentina Tereshkova, Irina Solovyova and Tatyana Kuznetsova as the most capable for the flight. Another set of problems he handled was the life support systems for the women, notably the female spacesuits - an unexpected problem.

The group passed cosmonauts examinations on 28 November 1962 and was put on hold until the end of April 1963. Preparation to the flight was impossible without a firmly set launch date, and nobody in the government dared to give a go-ahead. On 24 April, the government finally ordered a joint flight of two available Vostok spacecraft - the only two craft in stock. Their shelf life was set at 15 June 1963 and could not be extended. Thus, the flight preparation of Valery Bykovsky and Valentina Tereshkova (approved to fly 21 May) was hurried by "use it or lose it" deadline. Kamanin and the cosmonauts relocated to Baikonur 27 May and stayed there until the launch. In fact, Tereshkova lifted off 16 June - one day past her craft's expiration date. Kamanin worked mission control shifts while she was in space and had to wake Tereshkova who, asleep, failed to respond. Both crafts landed safely but overshot the landing target by two degrees. Like Gagarin, Tereshkova bailed from the landing capsule and used her personal parachute. After the flight, Kamanin again was involved in a time-consuming publicity campaign - this time, centered around Tereshkova.

In 1965, after Voskhod 2, Kamanin proposed a flight of female crew on the next Voskhod. Gagarin and other (male) cosmonauts were strongly against it. The case was closed with cancellation of all planned Voskhod launches.

=== Political failures ===
Kamanin was engaged in the rivalry between various powers behind Soviet space program - on the air force side. His personal vision of the space program was more than once cut short by this political rivalries.

Establishment of a single space agency. Kamanin realized the need to eradicate friction between the Rocket Force, the Air Force and different industrial groups (Korolyov, Mikhail Yangel, Vladimir Chelomei). His political influence alone was not enough to achieve this; the closest achievable goal was to unite all military space efforts under a single command. In November 1963, the General Staff proposed placing all military space projects under the Commander of Air Force; Rodion Malinovsky, minister of defence, scrapped the project. A later pro-Air Force campaign (May–July 1964) also failed. Rivalry and duplicate functions continued on lower levels; for example, the Institute of Medical and Biological Problems (established 1964) competed with the older Institute of Aviation and Space Medicine for personnel and premises, etc.

Expansion of Vostok programme. Kamanin also realized that Korolyov's Soyuz project was in the very distant future, and relying on Soyuz alone would ground his cosmonaut squad for years. From 1961 to 1963, he campaigned for more Vostok crewed launches. His calls to build 8-10 Vostok spacecraft did not materialize (at some point in 1963, he seemed to succeed with a "build Vostoks" program, but it was soon folded down). As a result, there were only three Soviet crewed flights between the last Vostok (June 1963) and the first crewed Apollo flight (October 1968); Kamanin was on mission control for all three, including Vladimir Komarov's fatal flight. By June 1964, Kamanin realized that the Soviet side had lost the space race; he blamed Korolyov and Mstislav Keldysh for the lack of realistic long-term plans. It's not surprising that idle time worked against personnel morale and caused even more interdepartmental politics.

Head of Training Center problems. After demotion of Colonel Karpov, the first head of Cosmonaut Training Center, Kamanin initially supported nomination of General Odintsov. Odintsov was approved 5 April 1963, and in a few weeks proved himself completely incompetent to the task - a view allegedly supported by Korolyov and Marshal Rudenko. 17 July AirForce Military Council dismissed Odintsov; Kamanin campaigned to nominate 29-year-old Yuri Gagarin, but was stonewalled by his superiors Vershinin and Rudenko. However, in September Rodion Malinovsky reinstalled Odintsov; the situation normalized in November 1963 with appointment of General Nikolai Kuznetsov. After the death of Gagarin, Kamanin (himself ultimately responsible for all cosmonaut training) blamed Kuznetsov for a sequence of errors that allowed Gagarin and Seregin to take off on their fatal flight. Replacing Kuznetsov, again, became a long bureaucratic struggle.

=== Disaster years: 1966-1968 ===
Korolyov. 1966 started with death of Sergey Korolyov. His successor, Vasily Mishin, backed by Mstislav Keldysh, started his own political campaign, targeted at capturing cosmonaut training facilities from the Air Force - which forever alienated Kamanin. In particular, Mishin promoted his own candidates into the space program; Kamanin deemed them inadequately trained to fly and insisted on Air Force candidates with a proven flight record. For some time, the future Soyuz missions had two competing crews - Air Force and OKB-1. Kamanin's cosmonauts were also assigned to the future Almaz, Spiral and two competing lunar projects. Probably as a reaction against Mishin, Kamanin rated Vladimir Chelomei and his staff very high, and his products - superior to Mishin's.

Komarov. Kamanin, as the state commissioner for the Soyuz 1 launch, was present at Baikonur throughout launch preparation that began 6 April 1967. Once the rocket lifted off on 23 April Kamanin took charge of the first mission control shift. Vladimir Komarov, on his second orbit, reported failure in solar panels - one of them failed to deploy. So far, the situation was manageable, and Kamanin dispatched Gagarin to the second mission control station in Yevpatoria. On the 13th orbit, the state commission realized there was an imminent danger and decided to land Komarov and cancel Soyuz 2. At 6:45 AM on 24 April, while Komarov was still alive, Kamanin boarded the plane departing to the landing area. In the air, Kamanin received the first (incorrect) news of Soyuz descending with a fully deployed parachute. He was not aware of disaster until meeting General Artamonov on the Orsk airfield. Kamanin lost an hour and half travelling to the crash site, only to see the capsule still on fire. Later, the Soyuz 1 parachute failure was linked to an insufficient pilot chute that failed to drag the main parachute from its container.

Gagarin and Seryogin. On 27 March 1968, Yuri Gagarin and Colonel Vladimir Seryogin were killed on a routine training flight in a Mig-15UTI jet trainer. Enquiries continued for more than a year and did not produce a clear answer. All cosmonaut flight training was suspended. Kamanin, as the person ultimately responsible for cosmonaut training, received a formal reprimand; without Gagarin and without any prospects of winning the space race, his own influence and influence of the Air Force on the space program deteriorated - while the American lunar program was steadily under way.

=== Retirement ===
On November 11, 1969, Marshal Kutakhov notified the 62-year-old Kamanin of his upcoming transfer to "consultancy" — a soft retirement. Two weeks later, before that paperwork was completed, Kamanin sent a bitter letter to Minister of Defense Andrei Grechko, explaining his view on military space program and rejecting as unnecessary "consultancy" employment. Kamanin continued working as usual; the string of premature deaths continued with Pavel Belyayev (10 January 1970).

In 1970, the Soviet space program re-oriented from lunar travel to orbital stations. In February 1970, Kamanin estimated first Almaz (Chelomei) or DOS-7K (Mishin) to be ready in summer 1971, at best. Selection of cosmonauts for the first orbital station, again, became a tug of war between Mishin and Kamanin, while the Air Force continued recruitment of new military pilots like Vladimir Dzhanibekov. 19 May - 19 June, Kamanin conducted the usual flight preparation and flight control sequence of Soyuz 9; health problems of cosmonauts returning from an 18-day mission caused a major redesign of future flight programs and another clash with Mishin (Mishin insisted on 30-days flights, Kamanin set for no more than 24 days).

Salyut 1 was launched 19 April 1971; initial failures of on-board fans and the scientific equipment bay were not considered a major problem. The crew of Soyuz 10, launched four days later, docked with the stations, but failed to lock the docking gasket firmly. They did not have enough fuel for a second docking and a safe return, nor the spacesuits for an EV transfer, and the mission controller aborted the flight. For the first time in Soviet space program, Soyuz 10 landed at night.

On 21 May 1971, Kamanin arrived at Baikonur for his last mission launch. Soyuz 11 lifted off 6 June, docked with the station, and completed the program, but the crew was killed by decompression on their landing run. Kamanin was at the mission control at Yevpatoria throughout their fatal descent and left his own transcript of conversation and the silence that followed.

Kamanin retired after the accident, replaced by Vladimir Shatalov.

In retirement, Kamanin acted as the leader of the Communist Party committee of his apartment building. He also continued writing books and articles, and giving public talks. He died in 1982 at the age of 74.

== Kamanin in media ==
Arkady and Nikolai Kamanin (played by Alexander Porokhovshchikov) are the characters of a 1978 Soviet film, Then You Will See the Sky ("И ты увидишь небо").

== Honours and awards ==
- Hero of the Soviet Union ("Gold Star", No. 2)
- Three Orders of Lenin (No. 414, ...)
- Order of the October Revolution
- Order of the Red Banner, twice
- Order of Suvorov, 2nd class, twice
- Order of Kutuzov, 2nd class
- Order of the Red Star
- Honorary Citizen of Vinnitsa, Bratislava, Plovdiv, Riga, Kaluga
- Medal "For the Victory over Germany in the Great Patriotic War 1941–1945"
- Medal "For the Capture of Vienna"
- Medal "For the Capture of Budapest"
- Jubilee Medal "XX Years of the Workers' and Peasants' Red Army"
