= Chelyuskin =

Chelyuskin or Cheliuskin may refer to one of the following.

- Semion Chelyuskin
- SS Chelyuskin, a 1933 Soviet ship named after Semion Chelyuskin; crushed and sunk in pack in 1933
- Cape Chelyuskin
