= Mavriky Slepnyov =

Russian-Soviet aviator

Mavriky Trofimovich Slepnyov
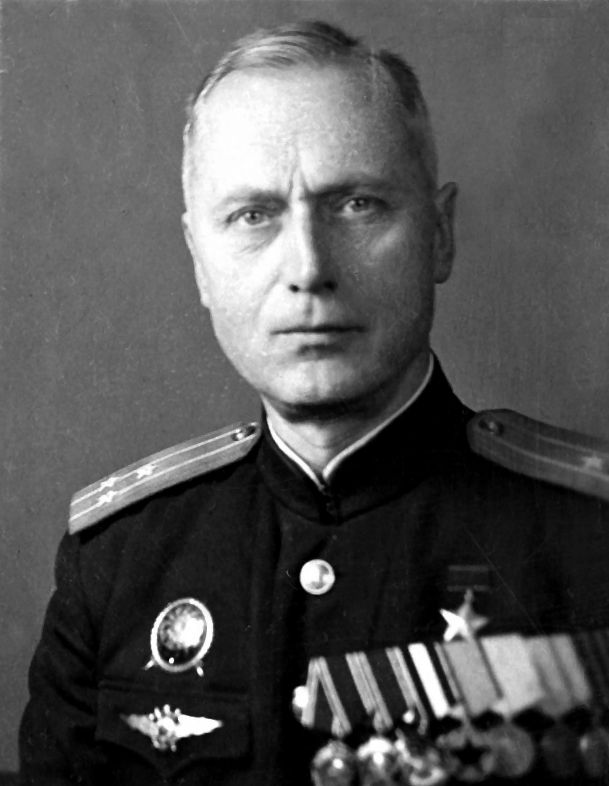
- Born: 27 December [O.S. 15 December] 1896; Yamskovitsy, Saint Petersburg Governorate, Russian Empire
- Died: 19 December 1965 (aged 68); Moscow, Soviet Union
- Military career
- Allegiance: Russian Empire; Soviet Union
- Branch: Soviet Air Force
- Service years: 1918—1946
- Rank: Colonel
- Awards: Hero of the Soviet Union; Order of Lenin (2); Order of Red Banner

Mavriky Trofimovich Slepnyov (Russian: Маврикий Трофимович Слепнёв; 27 December [O.S. 15 December] 1896 – 19 December 1965) was a Soviet polar aviator who was awarded Hero of the Soviet Union.

== Early life ==
Slepnyov was born on June 15 (27), 1896, in Yamskovitsy village, Yamburgsky Uyezd, Saint Petersburg Governorate (now Kingiseppsky District, Leningrad Oblast) in a peasant's family. He was a Russian national.

Mavrikiy Slepnyov graduated from the Warrant Officers' School (1915), Gatchina Flying School (1917), First Higher School of Military Pilots (1923), and Zhukovsky Air Force Engineering Academy (1936). Slepnyov took part in the First World War as a staff captain. He then participated in the Russian Civil War as a military engineer for the 25th Chapayev Rifle Division. In 1925, Mavrikiy Slepnyov became a pilot of the Civil Air Fleet and took part in the exploration of the airways of Central Asia, the Russian Far East, and the Arctic.

== The Deed and further Life ==
Slepnyov was awarded the title of the Fifth Hero of the Soviet Union on April 20, 1934, for the rescue of the SS Chelyuskin crew from an improvised airfield on the frozen surface of the Chukchi Sea near Kolyuchin Island. He personally evacuated 5 men and airlifted ill Otto Schmidt for care to the USA.

In 1935-1938, Mavriky Slepnyov was a member of the Central Executive Committee of the Soviet Union.

In 1937, he was appointed Chief Inspection Head at the Civil Air Fleet and dirigible squadron commander, at the same time (since 1935). In 1939, Mavrikiy Slepnyov became head of the Civil Air Fleet Academy. During the German-Soviet War, Slepnyov was a deputy commander of the Soviet Air Force Black Sea Fleet aviation brigade (1941–1942) and then was employed by the Main Department of the Naval Air Force and General Headquarters of the Soviet Navy. Mavrikiy Slepnyov retired in 1946.

Slepnyov died on December 19, 1965. He is buried in Moscow, at Novodevichy Cemetery.

Mavrikiy Slepnyov was awarded two Orders of Lenin, Order of the Red Banner, Order of the Red Half Moon of the Tajik SSR and numerous medals. Il-76 TD of Russian Emergency Ministry was named in his honour as well as the street in Moscow and Gatchina.
