= Vladimir Voronin (captain) =

Soviet naval explorer (1890–1952)

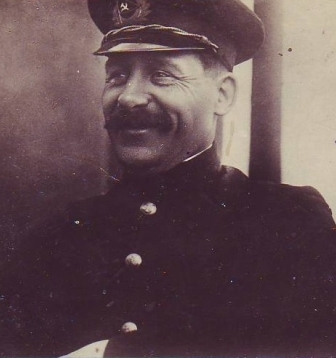
Vladimir Voronin

Vladimir Ivanovich Voronin (Russian: Владимир Иванович Воронин; October 17, 1890 – October 18, 1952) was a Soviet Navy captain, born in Sumsky Posad, in the present Republic of Karelia, Russia. In 1932 he commanded the expedition of the Soviet icebreaker A. Sibiryakov which made the first successful crossing of the Northern Sea Route in a single navigation without wintering. This voyage was organized by the All-Union Arctic Institute (presently known as the Arctic and Antarctic Research Institute).

== The A. Sibiryakov expedition ==
The A. Sibiryakov sailed from Arkhangelsk, crossed the Kara Sea and chose a northern, unexplored way around Severnaya Zemlya to the Laptev Sea. In September the propeller shaft broke and the icebreaker drifted for 11 days. However, the A. Sibiryakov used its sails and arrived in the Bering Strait in October. The icebreaker reached the Japanese port of Yokohama after 65 days, having covered more than 2500 miles in the Arctic seas. This was regarded as a heroic feat of Soviet polar seamen and Chief of Expedition Otto Schmidt and Captain Vladimir Voronin were received with many honors on their return to Russia.

The icebreaker A. Sibiryakov continued in service until it was sunk in 1942 after an unequal fight with German heavy cruiser Admiral Scheer during Operation Wunderland in World War II.

== The Chelyuskin expedition ==
In 1933-34 Voronin commanded another icebreaker on a dramatic, albeit not so fortunate, expedition. In July 1933 the Chelyuskin sailed from Leningrad before a large crowd. However, in September icebreaker Chelyuskin got stuck in pack ice in the Chukchi Sea near Kolyuchin Island. The crew worked hard to free the ship from the surrounding ice, succeeding after almost a week. But the ship became stuck again and drifted in the general direction of the pack ice toward the Bering Strait. By the end of November it became obvious that the Chelyuskin would not break free from the pack ice and would have to winter on the Chukchi Sea. Eventually the ship was squeezed by large ice floes and was in danger of sinking. Captain Voronin ordered the crew to unload equipment from the ship and set up a camp site astern of the ship. But cracks in the ice formed under the tents, forcing the crew to load their equipment back onto the ship. The Chelyuskin drifted for the next two months in the Chukchi Sea to the east of Wrangel Island.

Finally, increasing pressure resulted in the ship's creaking and eventual breach by ice. Voronin and Otto Schmidt managed to jump off just in time before the Chelyuskin sank close to Kolyuchin Island. Thus only one crew member went down with the ship. The crew then set up tents on a part of the ice surface that was named Camp Schmidt. The crew made radio contact with the village of Uelen on the Chukchi Peninsula and asked for help. During a dramatic rescue operation, pilot Anatoly Lyapidevsky sighted Camp Schmidt, landed his plane on the ice, and rescued the women and children before returning to Uelen. The remaining passengers and crew of the ill-fated icebreaker Chelyuskin were rescued later and flown to Cape Vankarem on the Chukotka Peninsula. Due to severe weather conditions, the rescue took one month with planes trying hard to carry out the rescue operation from Khabarovsk; Nome in Alaska; and Cape Olyutor until they were successful.

== Memory ==
Some geographic locations in Russia have been named in honor of this Soviet captain and explorer of the Arctic waters

- Voronina Island, a small island group in the Kara Sea.
- Banka Voronina, a shoal in the Gulf of Finland 60°23′N 28°08′E.
- Bukhta Voronina, a bay in the NW shores of Novaya Zemlya 76°12′N 62°36′E.
- The Voronin Trough, a geological feature in the Arctic Ocean basin with a depth of 450m located 290 km east of Franz Josef Land.

Cape Voronin off Viachtu Bay in Sakhalin Island, however, is not named after Captain Vladimir Voronin, but after Second lieutenant Aleksey Ivanovich Voronin, a previous Russian explorer who took part in the 1849–1855 Amur Expedition.

ARC-7 class Ice breaking LNG carrier launched in 2019 named Vladimir Voronin in his honor. Vessel regularly makes unescorted passages of the Northern Sea Route carry LNG from LNG plant in Sabetta to Europe and Asia.
