= Ivan Doronin =

Soviet pilot

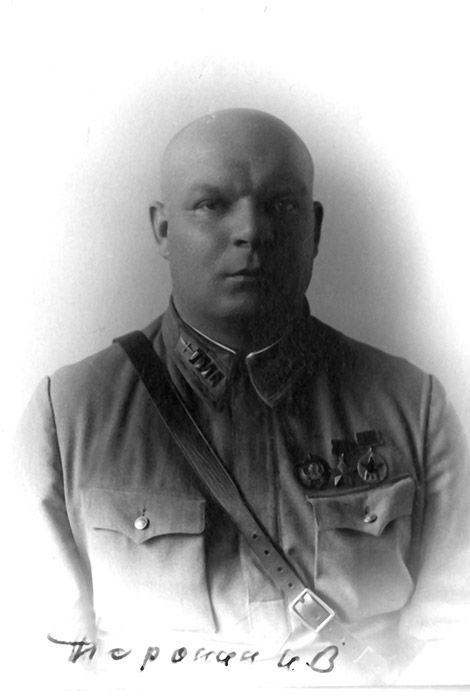
- Born: 5 May [O.S. 22 April] 1903; Kamenka, Samara Governorate, Russian Empire
- Died: 2 February 1951 (aged 47); Moscow
- Military career
- Allegiance: Soviet Union
- Branch: Soviet Air Force
- Service years: 1920 - 1947
- Awards: Hero of the Soviet Union; Order of Lenin (2); Order of Red Banner; Order of the Patriotic War; Order of Red Star

Colonel Ivan Vasilyevich Doronin (Russian: Ива́н Васи́льевич Доро́нин; 5 May [O.S. 22 April] 1903 – 2 February 1951, Moscow) was a Soviet pilot and Hero of the Soviet Union (April 20, 1934).

== Biography ==
Doronin was born on 5 May [O.S. 22 April] 1903 in Kamenka, Nikolayevsky Uezd, Samara Governorate (now Pugachyovsky District, Saratov Oblast) to a Russian peasant family. He volunteered for the navy (Baltic Fleet) in 1920 and in 1924 he was assigned to Yegoryevsk Aviation Theorethical School. He graduated from the Sevastopol Flying School in 1925 and then served as a navy pilot in the Black Sea Fleet, later as instructor in naval aviation school. In 1930, Ivan Doronin joined the civil aviation in the Russian North. He was a crew commander at a line Irkutsk-Yakutsk-Bodaybo. He participated in exploration of Kara Sea. Doronin was the first to fly over Verkhoyansk Range, he has mapped a line from Irkutsk to Ust-Srednekan.

In 1934, he took part in the rescue of the Chelyuskin steamship crew from an improvised airstrip on the frozen surface of the Chukchi Sea, for which he would be awarded the title of the Hero of the Soviet Union. In 1939 he graduated from Zhukovsky Air Force Engineering Academy. Later in his life, Ivan Doronin headed experimental flight stations at Aircraft Factory №1 and Aircraft Factory №301. In 1947, he retired due to his illness.

He died at February 2, 1951. Ivan Doronin is buried in Moscow, at Novodevichy Cemetery.

Ivan Doronin was also awarded the Order of Lenin.

== Memory ==
- Streets were named after Doronin in Astrakhan, Ekaterinburg, Moscow, Yaroslavl, Sevastopol.
- A post mark was issued in 1935 to commemorate Ivan Doronin.
- A river ship was named after him.
