= Semyon Chelyuskin =

Russian polar explorer and naval officer

Semyon Ivanovich Chelyuskin (Russian: Семён Иванович Челюскин; c. 1707 – 1764) was a Russian polar explorer and naval officer.

Chelyuskin graduated from the Navigation School in Moscow. He first became a deputy navigator while serving in the Baltic Fleet (1728) and later promoted to navigator (1733). Chelyuskin was chosen for the Second (Great Northern) Kamchatka Expedition, in which he took part until 1743. He participated in expeditions, led by Vasily Pronchischev and Khariton Laptev. In spring of 1741, Chelyuskin made a voyage from the Khatanga River to the Pyasina River by land. He described the western coastline from the Taimyr Peninsula to the Middendorff Bay and then from the mouth of Pyasina to the mouth of the Yenisei River. In winter of 1741–1742, he traveled from Turukhansk to the mouth of the Khatanga River, describing the northern coastline of the Taimyr Peninsula from the Faddey Bay on the East to the mouth of the Taimyra River on the West. Chelyuskin found the northern extremity of Asia, which Aleksandr Fyodorovich Middendorf would later name after him in 1843 (Cape Chelyuskin).

He was discharged from the Baltic Fleet in the rank of a captain in 1760.

== Named in honor ==
Cape Chelyuskin (the northernmost cape of Eurasia), Chelyuskin Peninsula (northern tip of Taymyr), Chelyuskin Island near Taymyr, famous Soviet Chelyuskin steamship and some streets and settlements have been named after Chelyuskin.

In 1930s the Soviet Union operated a steamship built in Denmark in 1933, SS Chelyuskin, named after Semion Chelyuskin. It sank in the Chukchi Sea near Kolyuchin Island during an ill-fated attempt to cover the Northern Sea Route.

The 1965-built icebreaker Ledokol-8 was renamed Semyon Chelyuskin in 1966.
