= Semyon Chelyuskin (icebreaker) =

History

Soviet Union
- Name: Ledokol-8 (Ледокол-8) (1965–1966); Semyon Chelyuskin (Семён Челюскин) (1966–1988?)
- Namesake: Semyon Chelyuskin
- Owner: North-Eastern Directorate of the Maritime Fleet
- Port of registry: Tiksi, Soviet Union
- Builder: Admiralty Shipyard (Leningrad, USSR)
- Yard number: 770
- Laid down: 12 December 1964
- Launched: 28 February 1965
- Completed: 11 August 1965
- Decommissioned: 12 September 1988(?)
- In service: 1965–1988(?)
- Identification: IMO number: 6514522
- Fate: Broken up

General characteristics
- Class & type: Dobrynya Nikitich-class icebreaker
- Displacement: 2,935 t (2,889 long tons)
- Length: 67.7 m (222 ft)
- Beam: 18 m (59 ft)
- Draught: 5.35 m (17.6 ft)
- Depth: 8.3 m (27.2 ft)
- Installed power: 3 × 13D100 (3 × 1,800 hp)
- Propulsion: Diesel-electric; three shafts (2 × 2,400 hp + 1,600 hp)
- Speed: 15 knots (28 km/h; 17 mph)
- Range: 5,700 nautical miles (10,600 km; 6,600 mi) at 13 knots (24 km/h; 15 mph)
- Endurance: 17 days
- Complement: 42

Semyon Chelyuskin (Russian: Семён Челюскин) was a Soviet icebreaker in service from 1965 until at least 1988. It was one of twelve Project 97A icebreakers built by Admiralty Shipyard in Leningrad in 1961–1971.

== Description ==
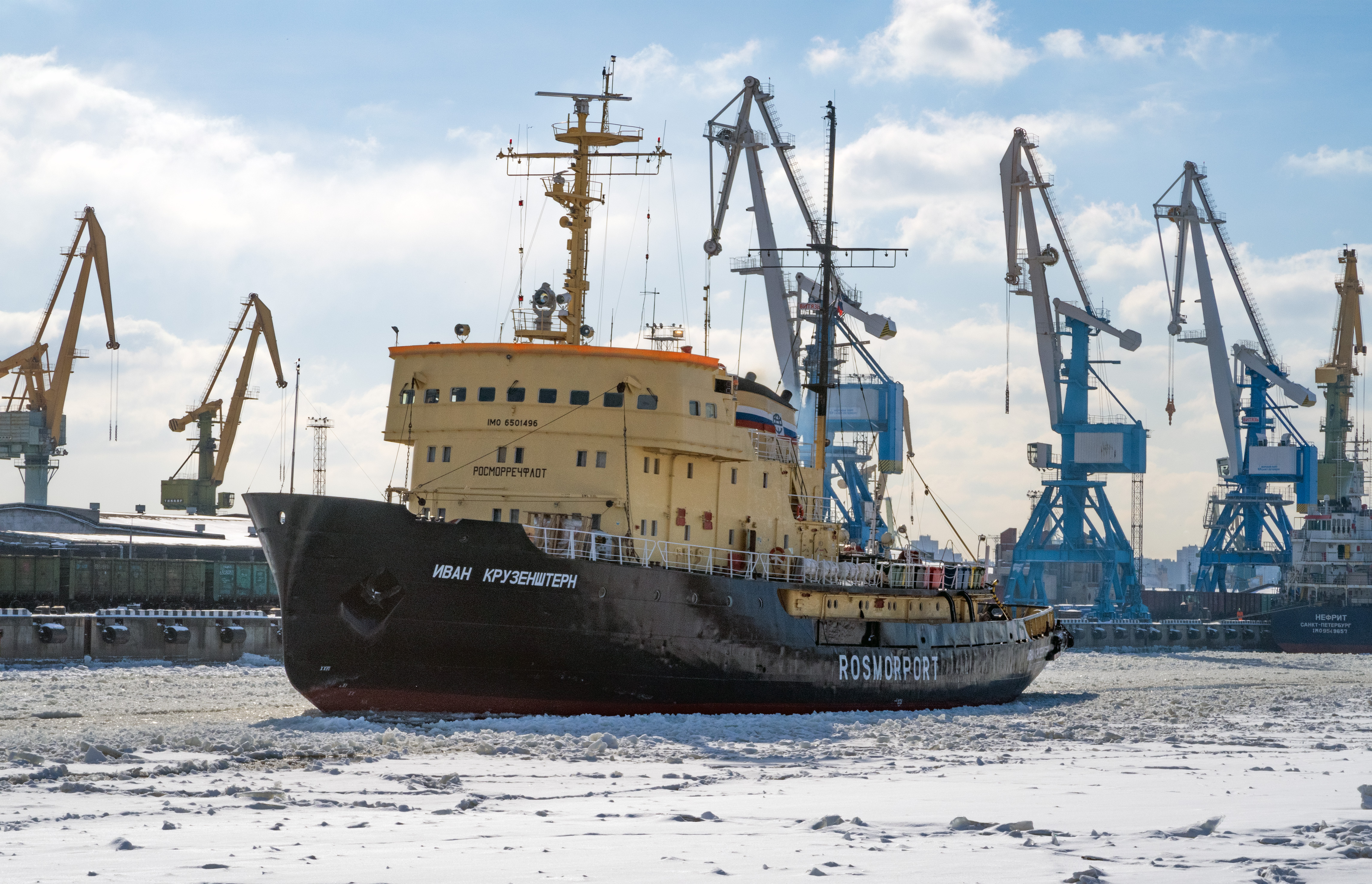
Ivan Kruzenstern, a similar Project 97A icebreaker

In the mid-1950s, the Soviet Union began developing a new diesel-electric icebreaker design based on the 1942-built steam-powered icebreaker Eisbär to meet the needs of both civilian and naval operators. Built in various configurations until the early 1980s, the Project 97 icebreakers and their derivatives became the largest and longest-running class of icebreakers and icebreaking vessels built in the world. Of the 32 ships built in total, the unarmed civilian variant Project 97A was the most numerous with twelve icebreakers built in 1961–1971.

Project 97A icebreakers were 67.7 metres (222 ft) long overall and had a beam of 18 metres (59 ft). Fully laden, the vessels drew 5.35 metres (17.6 ft) of water and had a displacement of 2,935 tonnes (2,889 long tons). Their three 1,800-horsepower (1,300 kW) 10-cylinder 13D100 two-stroke opposed-piston diesel engines were coupled to generators that powered electric propulsion motors driving two propellers in the stern and a third one in the bow. Project 97A icebreakers were capable of breaking 70 to 75 centimetres (28 to 30 in) thick snow-covered ice at very slow but continuous speed.

== History ==
The eighth of twelve Project 97A icebreakers was laid down at Admiralty Shipyard in Leningrad on 12 December 1964, launched on 28 February 1965, and delivered to the North-Eastern Directorate of the Maritime Fleet on 11 August 1965. Initially named simply Ledokol-8 (Russian: Ледокол-8), Russian for "icebreaker", it was renamed Semyon Chelyuskin in 1966 after the 18th century Russian polar explorer and naval officer. The icebreaker was stationed in Tiksi.

Semyon Chelyuskin was taken out of service in September 1988. Some sources state that the vessel was broken up shortly thereafter in China while others claim that it served briefly with the Vietnamese Navy until the 1990s.
