= Anatoly Lyapidevsky =

Soviet pilot and early Hero of the Soviet Union

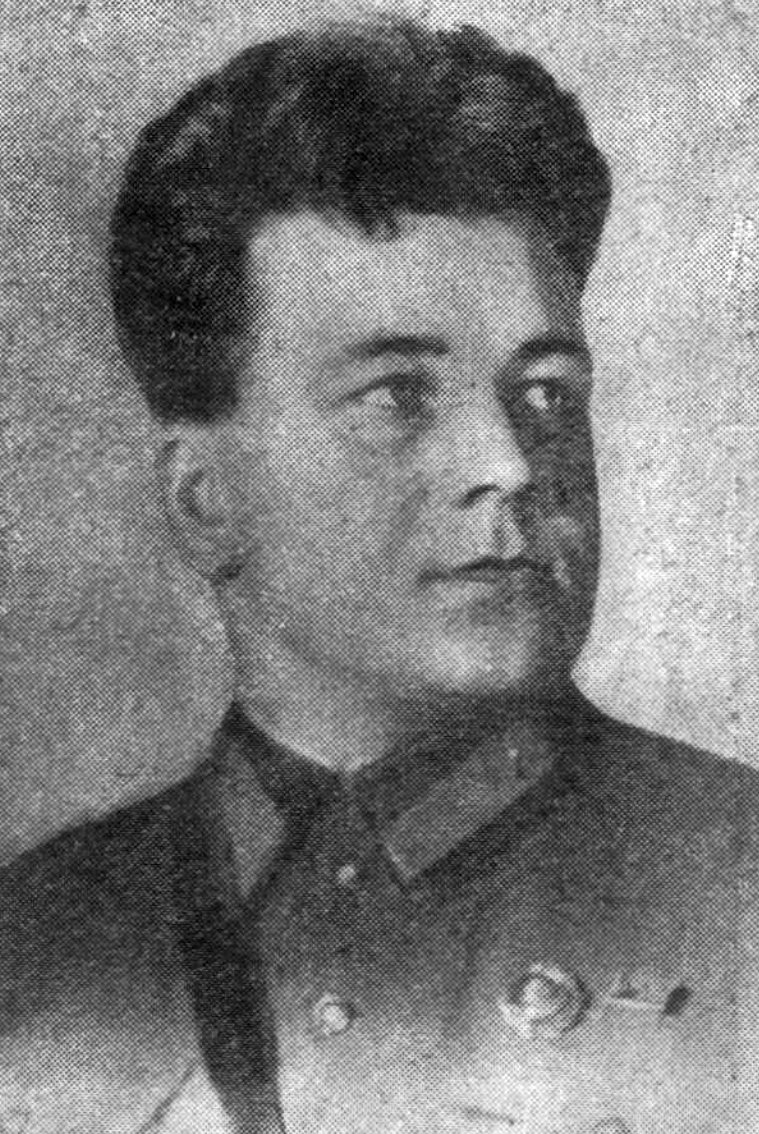
- Native name: Анатолий Васильевич Ляпидевский
- Born: March 23, 1908; Belaya Glina, Stavropol Governorate, Russian Empire
- Died: April 29, 1983 (aged 75) Moscow, Soviet Union
- Allegiance: Soviet Union
- Branch: Soviet Air Force
- Service years: 1926–33; 1935–61
- Rank: Major general
- Conflicts: World War II
- Awards: Hero of the Soviet Union

Anatoly Vasilyevich Lyapidevsky (Note: Russian: Анатолий Васильевич Ляпидевский, IPA: [ɐnɐˈtolʲɪj vɐˈsʲilʲjɪvʲɪdʑ‿lʲɪpʲɪˈdʲefskʲɪj]; In this name that follows East Slavic naming customs, the patronymic is Vasilyevich and the family name is Lyapidevsky.) (23 March 1908 – 29 April 1983) was a Soviet aircraft pilot and one of the first people to be awarded the title of Hero of the Soviet Union (in June 1934). A graduate of the Soviet Air Force Academy, he reached the rank of Major general of the Soviet Air Force at 1946.

== Birth and youth ==
Anatoly Lyapidevsky was born on March 23 (10), 1908 in the Belaya Glina village in Stavropol Governorate (now Krasnodar Krai) in the family of a clergyman. His family is of a dynasty of clergymen from Tula Governorate. At childhood he dwelt at Staroshcherbinovskaya stanitsa, later at Yeysk. Lyapidevsky worked as an apprentice in a smithy, apprentice of a metalworker, an engineman of a mowing machine, driver assistant at an oil mill.

In 1926 he was conscripted into the Red Army. In 1927 Anatoly has graduated from Leningrad Military Theory School of the Air Force, in 1928 – from Sevastopol School of Naval Pilots. Lyapidevsky served in a frontline unit of Naval Aviation of the Red Banner Baltic Fleet, then as an instructor pilot at Yeysk School of Naval Pilots. He was discharged in 1933.

== Pilot ==
He worked as a pilot with the Far Eastern department of the Civil Air Fleet. Lyapidevsky took part in an aerial search and rescue operation for the crew of the steamship Chelyuskin, under extremely difficult conditions, after it was sunk in Arctic waters after February 13, 1934.

== Rescue ==
Together with six other pilots, Lyapidevsky rescued 104 people from the wrecked freighter. The rescue operation took two months, as survivors waited to be rescued on ice floes. Lyapidevsky personally made 29 scouting flights despite blizzards. Lyapidevsky made his first landing on one of the floes on March 5. It was a great feat of flying. Not only was the weather horrid but the floe was only 500 by 1,300 feet. Lyapidevsky took off from the floe with 10 women and 2 children on board his plane. He flew the stranded people from their makeshift airstrip on the floating ice field of the Chukchi Sea to the town of Uelen. Lyapidevsky was awarded the title of the Hero of the Soviet Union for this deed on April 20, 1934. After the Gold Star medals had appeared, on November 4, 1939 No.1 medal was handed over to him.

The heroics of the fliers in the Chelyuskin Rescue prompted the government to create the title of Hero of the Soviet Union. The title later became the Soviet Union's highest military honor.

== After the feat ==
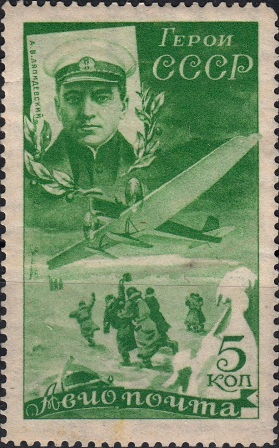
Lyapidevsky honoured on a 1935 postage stamp

In 1935 Lyapidevsky returned to the Army. In 1939 he graduated from the Department of Engineering of Zhukovsky Air Force Engineering Academy. Beginning in 1939, he was the deputy of the head of the Main Inspectorate of People's Commissariat of Aviation Industry and head of Aviation Factory No.156 (Moscow, after October 1941 – Omsk).

Lyapidevsky participated in World War II. From May to September 1942 he was head of 4th Department of the Air Force Research Institute, from September 1942 to September 1943 he took the position of Deputy Commander of Air Force of 19th Army, then head of field repair service of 7th Air Army (Karelian Front).

In 1943 Lyapidevsky returned to his work as head of an aviation factory. After the end of the war, he worked as the main inspector of Ministry of State Control, deputy of Minister of Aviation Industry. From 1949 to 1954 Lyapidevsky was head of Factory No.25 of Ministry of Aviation Industry. After in May 1954 the factory was handed over to Ministry of Medium Machine Building, he was the first deputy of the head of Design Bureau-25 and head of Experimental Factory No.25 (now All-Russian Research Institute of Automation). From 1962 to 1983 he was the lead constructor, the deputy of the main engineer of Mikoyan Design Bureau. Major-General Lyapidevsky was discharged in 1961.

He died on April 29, 1983, after catching a cold at the funeral of Vasily Molokov. Lyapidevsky is buried in Moscow, at Novodevichy Cemetery.

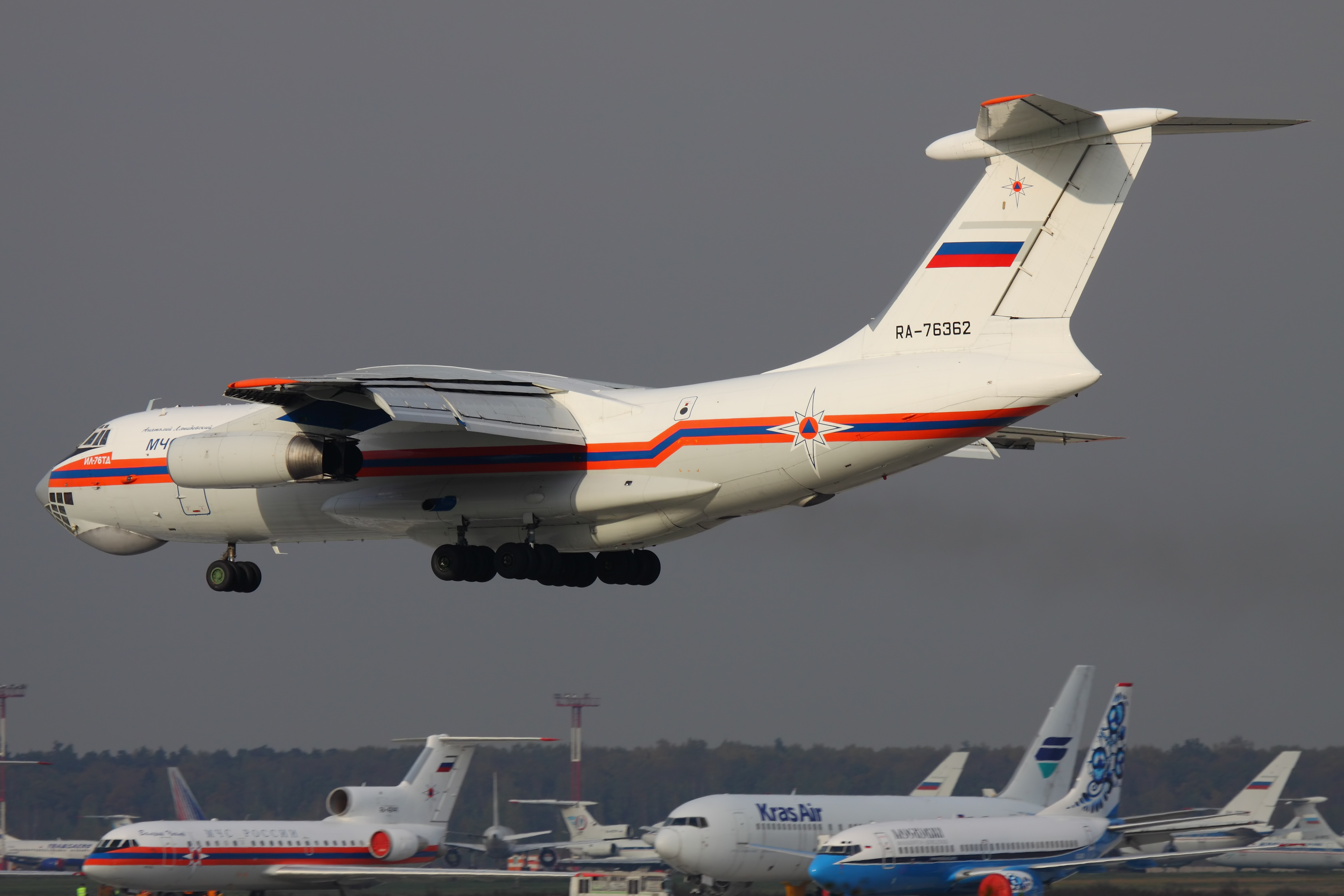
The airplane named after Anatoly Lyapidevsky.

== Memory ==
- In 1935 a postmark was issued to commemorate Lyapidevsky's deed.
- Streets in numerous Russian towns have been named after him.
- Omsk Flight and Technical College of Civil Aviation is named after Lyapidevsky.
- Three schools in Russia are named after Anatoly Lyapidevsky.
- An airplane of EMERCOM is named after him.
