= SS Chelyuskin =

Soviet icebreaker

Coordinates: 68.3014°N 172.8278°W

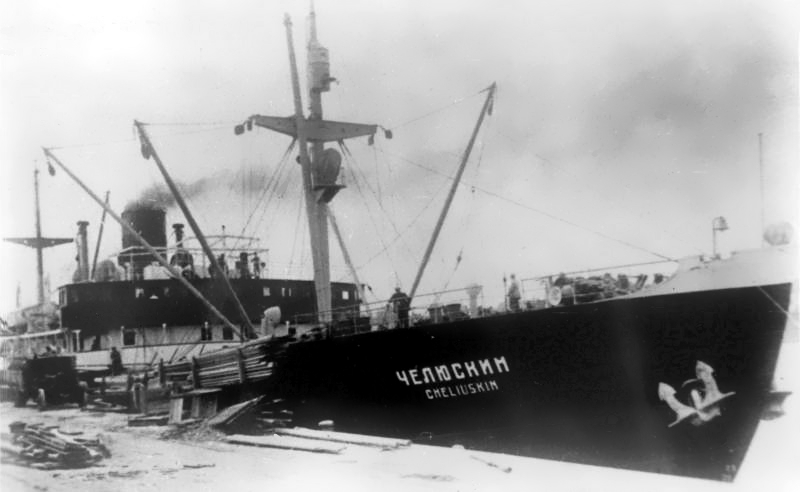
- Chelyuskin

History
- Name: Chelyuskin
- Owner: (Soviet Union) Sovtorgflot
- Operator: Glavsevmorput
- Builder: (Denmark) Burmeister & Wain Copenhagen
- Launched: 11 March 1933
- Christened: Semion Chelyuskin
- Completed: 1933
- Maiden voyage: 6 May 1933
- Fate: Sank 13 February 1934

General characteristics
- Type: Steam ship
- Tonnage: 7,500t
- Length: 310.2 ft (94.5 m)
- Beam: 54.3 ft (16.6 m)
- Height: 22.0 ft (6.7 m)
- Installed power: 2400hp
- Speed: 12,5 knots
- Crew: 111

SS Chelyuskin (Russian: «Челю́скин», IPA: [tɕɪˈlʲuskʲɪn]) was a Soviet steamship, reinforced to navigate through polar ice, that in 1934 became ice-bound in Arctic waters during a navigation along the Northern Maritime Route from Murmansk to Vladivostok and sank. 111 people were on board the Chelyuskin, and all but one were rescued by air. The expedition's task was to determine the possibility to travel by non-icebreaker through the Northern Maritime Route in a single navigation season.

It was built in Denmark in 1933 by Burmeister & Wain, Copenhagen and named after the 18th century Russian polar explorer Semion Ivanovich Chelyuskin. The head of the expedition was Otto Yuliyevich Shmidt and the ship's captain was V. I. Voronin. There were 111 people on board the steamship, including Soviet cinematographers Mark Troyanovsky and Arkadii Shafran who documented on film the entire voyage, including the rescue. The crew members were known as Chelyuskintsy, with the singular form "Chelyuskinets".

== Mission ==
After leaving Murmansk on 2 August 1933, the steamship managed to get through most of the Northern Route before it was caught in the ice fields in September. Eight members of the crew had been dropped off at Kolyuchin Island, so there were 104 people on board including 10 women and two small children. One of the children was only 6 months old: geodesicist Vasily Vasiliev's daughter Karina, born on August 31, 1933, during the voyage in the Kara Sea. After becoming icebound, the ship drifted in the ice pack before sinking on 13 February 1934, crushed by the icepacks near Kolyuchin Island in the Chukchi Sea. During the wreck one crew member, B. G. Mogilevich, was killed by deck cargo. The survivors made a camp on the ice floe. The women and children were airlifted out by Anatoly Liapidevsky on March 5 after 29 rescue flight attempts, but the men in the crew were not rescued until April after over two months on the ice. The crew managed to escape onto the ice and built a makeshift airstrip using only a few spades, ice shovels and two crowbars. They had to rebuild the airstrip thirteen times, until they were rescued in April of the same year and flown to the village of Vankarem on the coast of the sea. From there, some of the Chelyuskinites were flown further to the village of Uelen, while fifty-three men walked over 300 miles to get there.

The aircraft pilots who took part in search and rescue operations were the first people to receive the newly established highest title of Hero of the Soviet Union. Those pilots were Anatoly Liapidevsky, Sigizmund Levanevsky (who crashed en route to the camp, but survived), Vasily Molokov, Mavriky Slepnyov, Mikhail Vodopianov, Nikolai Kamanin and Ivan Doronin. Liapidevsky flew an ANT-4, the civilian version of the TB-1 heavy bomber, while Slepnev and Levanevsky flew a Consolidated Fleetster specially brought in from the US for the mission, and the other pilots flew the Polikarpov R-5. Two American air mechanics, Clyde Goodwin Armitstead, and William Latimer Lavery, also helped in the search and rescue of the Chelyuskintsy, on 10 September 1934, and were awarded the Order of Lenin.

As the steamship became trapped at the entrance to the Bering Strait, the USSR considered the expedition mainly successful, as it had proven that a regular steamship had a chance to navigate the whole Northern Maritime Route in a single season. After a few additional trial runs in 1933 and 1934, the Northern Sea Route was officially opened and commercial exploitation began in 1935. The following year part of the Soviet Baltic Fleet made the passage to the Pacific where an armed conflict with Japan was looming.

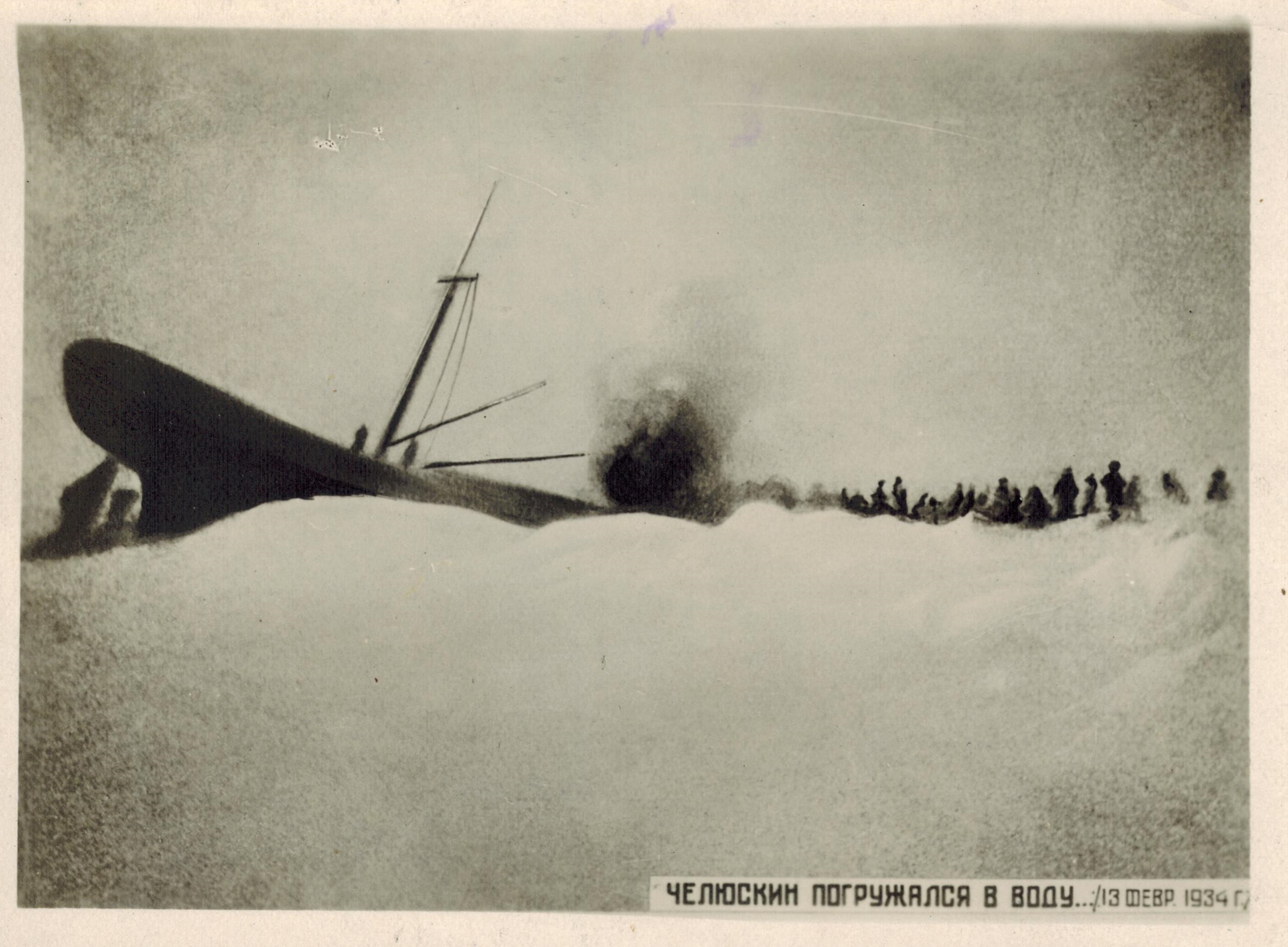
Sinking of the Chelyuskin

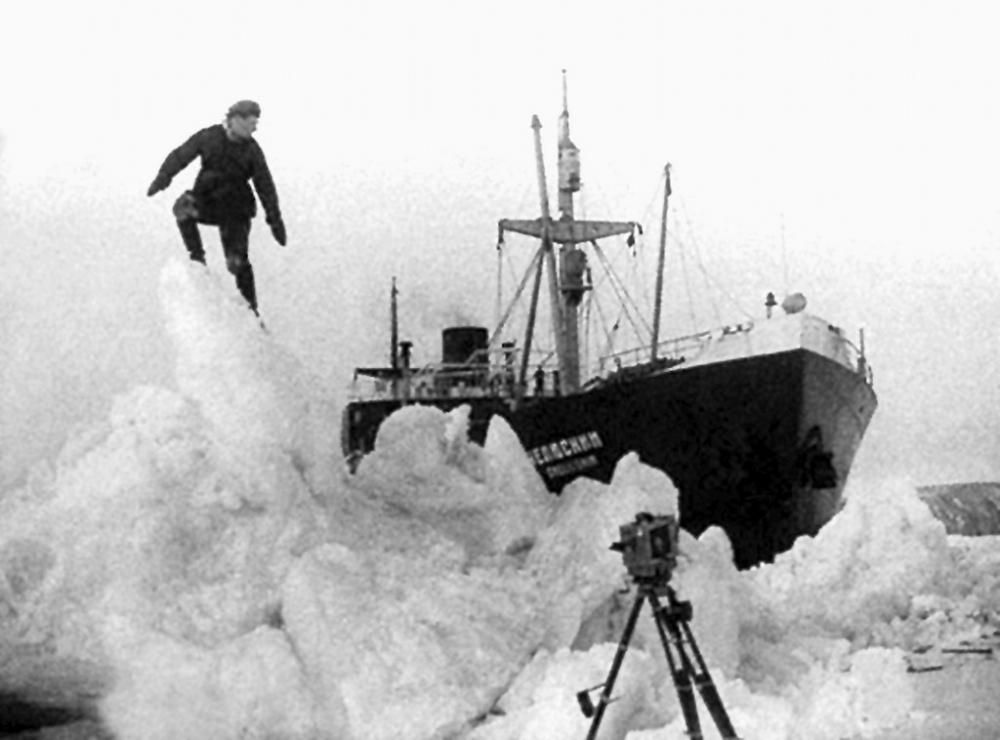
Chelyuskin, 1933, photo by Novitsky

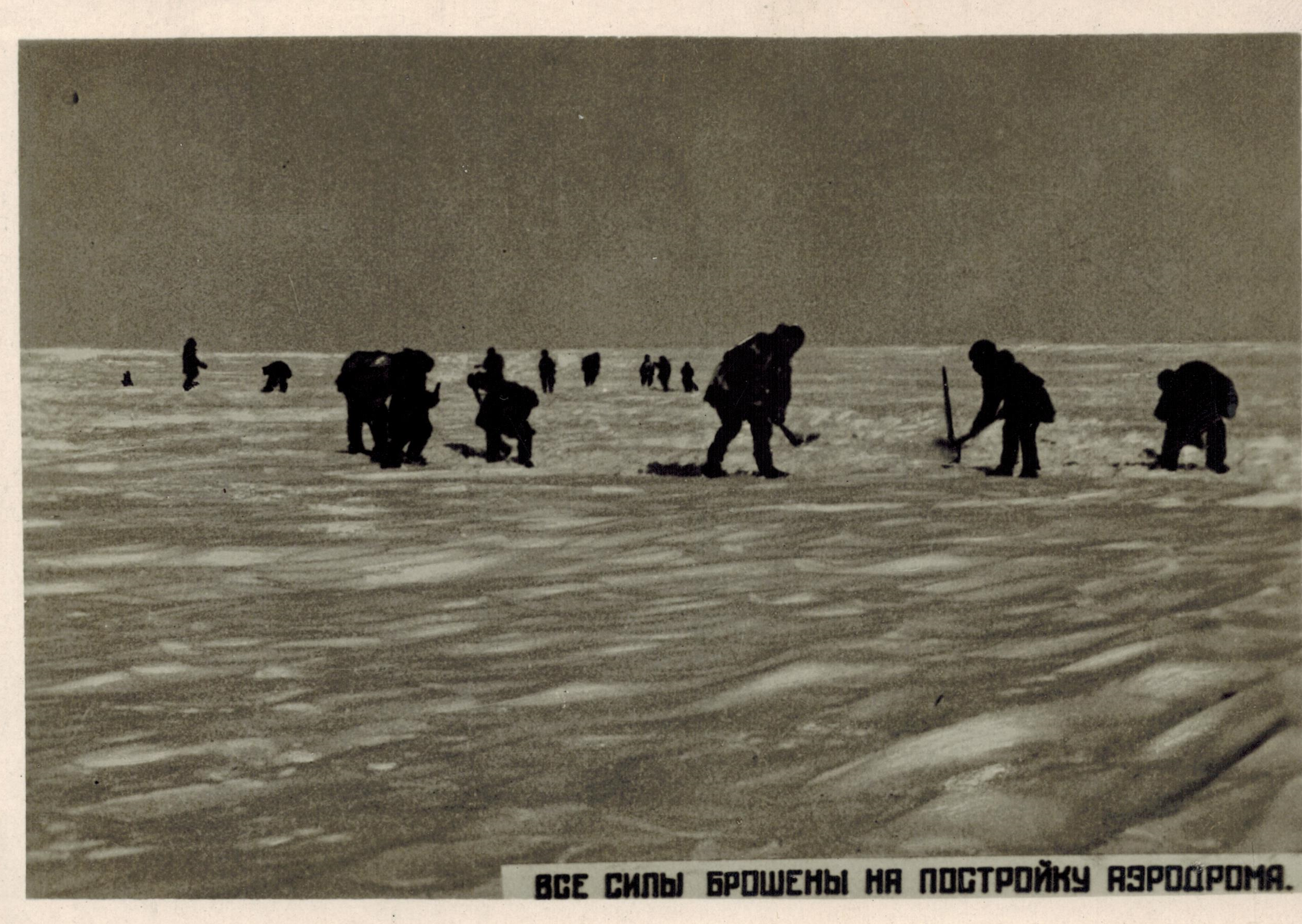
Chelyuskin survivors building the airstrip

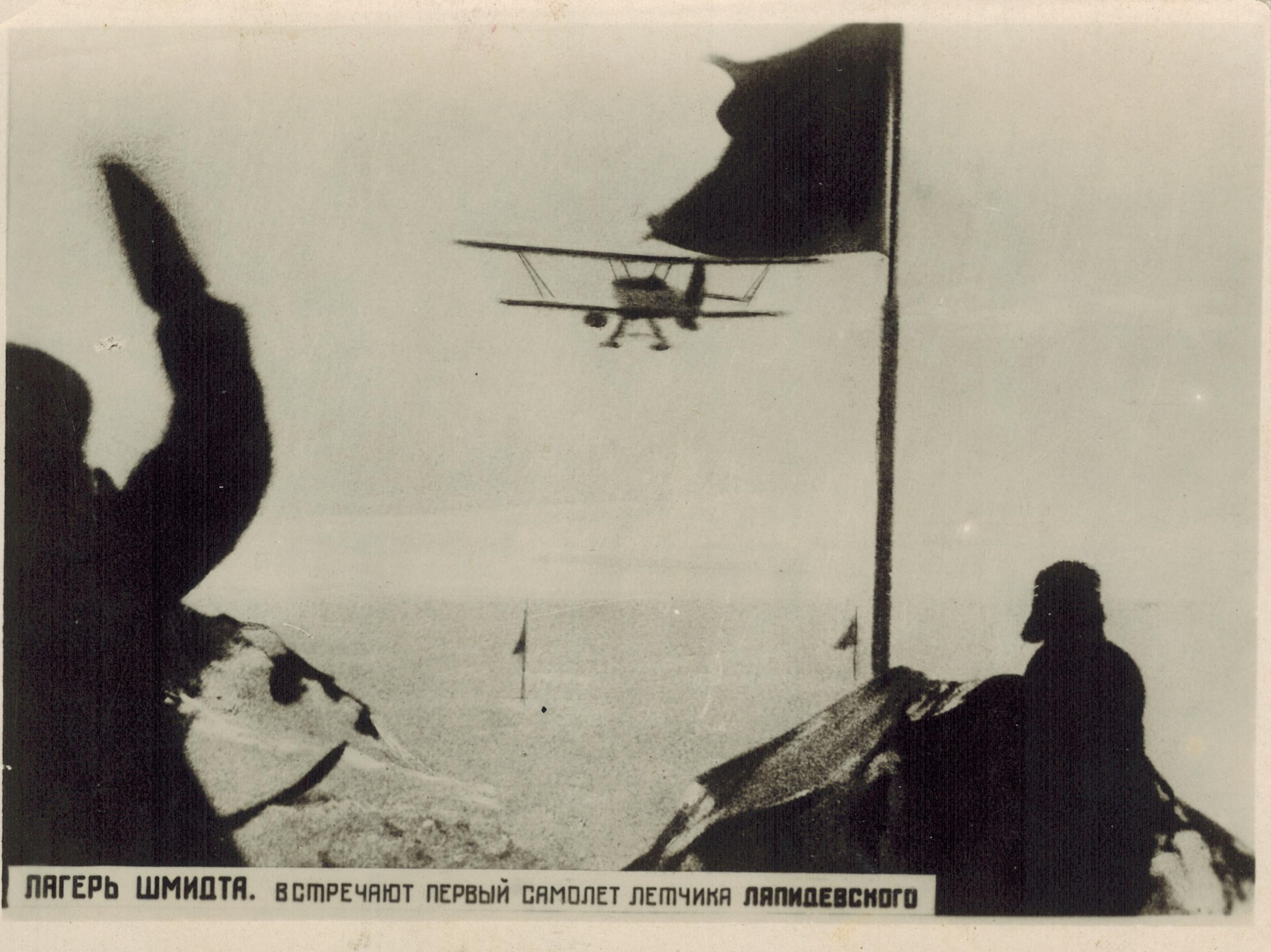
Greeting the first rescue airplane

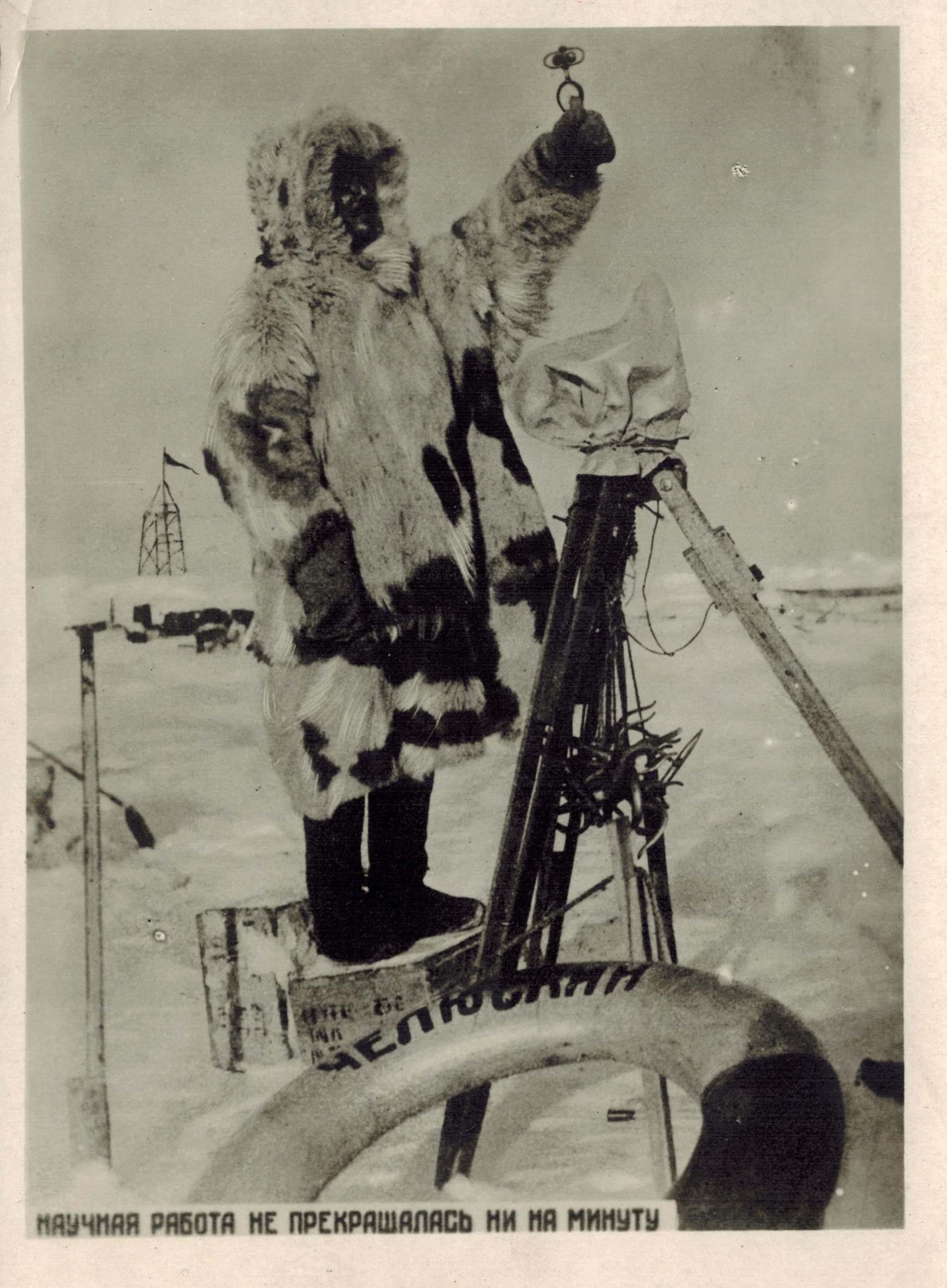
Photo titled as "Scientific observations never ceased"

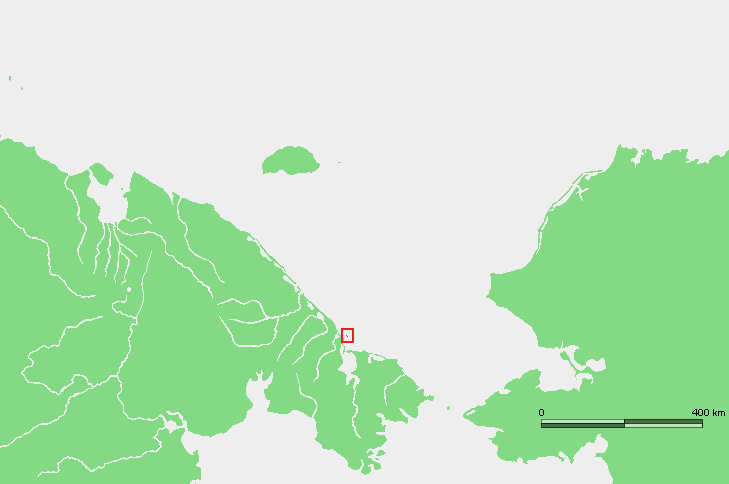
Location of Kolyuchin Island

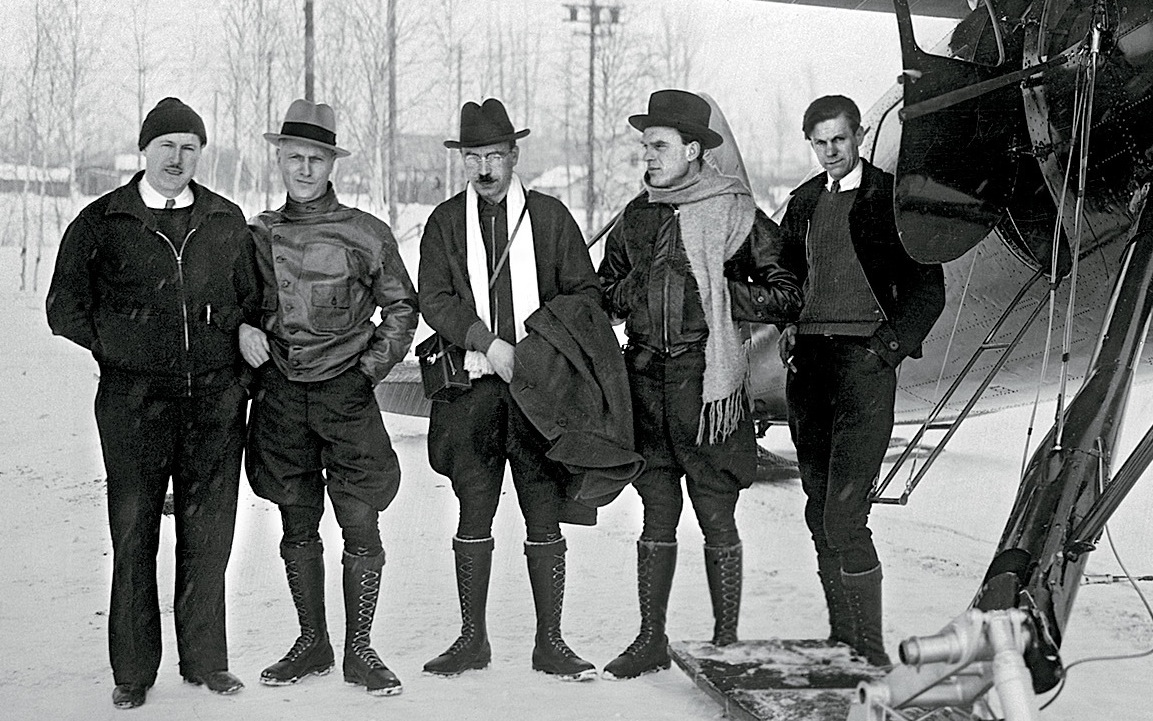
From left to right: Joe Crosson (brother of Marvel Crosson), Mavriky Slepnyov, Georgy Ushakov, Sigizmund Levanevsky, radio operator of Ladd Army Airfield in Alaska during the expedition to rescue the crew of SS Chelyuskin.

== Legacy ==
In the wake of the catastrophe, a central square in Yaroslavl was renamed after the Chelyuskintsy, as was Chelyuskinites Park in Minsk. Marina Tsvetayeva wrote a poem applauding the rescue team. Nine days after the two Soviet cameramen aboard reached Moscow, their footage was developed, edited and released as a feature documentary motion picture. In 1970, East German television produced Tscheljuskin, a film about the ship's voyage, directed by Rainer Hausdorf and featuring Eberhard Mellies as Prof. Schmidt, Dieter Mann as the surveyor Vasiliev and Fritz Diez as Valerian Kuybyshev.

Efforts to find the wreck of the ship were made by at least four different expeditions, and it was finally discovered in September 2006, at a depth of about 50 metres in the Chukchi Sea. The polar explorer Artur Chilingarov argued that the ship should be raised and converted into a museum.

Michael Roberts, an English poet, wrote a poem "Chelyuskin", which was included in his collection Poems, published by Jonathan Cape in 1936.

The story was dramatised in the radio drama The Cruise of the Chelyuskin.

== See also ==
- Cape Serdtse-Kamen
- SS Dzhurma
