= Vasily Molokov =

Soviet aircraft pilot and major general of aviation

- Russian: Васи́лий Серге́евич Мо́локов
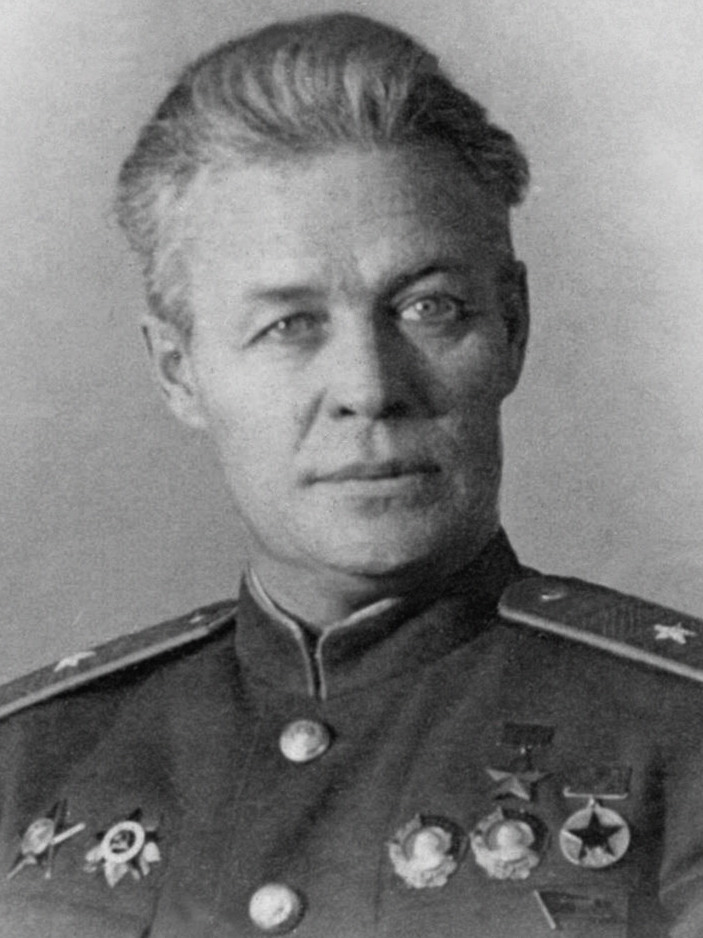
- Born: 13 February [O.S. 1 February] 1895; Irininskoye, Moscow Governorate, Russian Empire
- Died: 29 December 1982 (aged 87); Moscow, Russian SFSR, Soviet Union
- Military career
- Allegiance: Soviet Union
- Branch: Soviet Air Force
- Rank: Major-General
- Awards: Hero of the Soviet Union

Vasily Sergeyevich Molokov (Russian: Васи́лий Серге́евич Мо́локов; 13 February [O.S. 1 February] 1895 – 29 December 1982) was a Soviet aircraft pilot, major general of aviation (1940), and a Hero of the Soviet Union (29 April 1934).

== Birth and Youth ==
Vasily Molokov was born in Irininskoye village in Moscow Governorate (now Molokovo of Moscow Oblast) on 13 February [O.S. 1 February] 1895. From 1904 he worked in a box workshop in Moscow, then as a hammerer and metalworker in a smithy.

== Army Service ==
Vasily Molokov enlisted in the Imperial Russian Army in 1915. He then joined the Red Army in January 1918 and took part in the Russian Civil War. In 1921, he graduated from the Naval Aviation School in Samara and then took training extension courses at the Zhukovsky Air Force Engineering Academy (1929). Since 1925 Molokov was member of the Communist Party.

== Civil Aviation and Feat ==
In 1931, Vasily Molokov joined the civil aviation. He flew the airlines in Siberia and Far East of Russia. In April 1934 he took part in the successful Arctic aerial rescue operation saving people from the sunken steamship Cheliuskin from an improvised airfield on the ice of the Chukchi Sea. Vasily Molokov saved 39 men - more than any other pilot. His two-seat R-5 took on board 6 men, using parachute boxes under the wings for carrying passengers. He was awarded the title of the Hero of the Soviet Union for this deed.

== After the Deed ==
In 1935, Molokov performed an outstanding for that time flight by route Krasnoyarsk-Kirensk-Yakutsk-Nagaevo-Nizhnekolymsk-Uelen and back along the Arctic coast to Arkhangelsk on a Dornier Do J flying boat. This flight has opened a new line over Eastern Siberia and Kamchatka.

In 1936, Vasily Molokov performed a flight along the Soviet Arctic coast. In 1937, he participated in a North Pole expedition as the command pilot of TB-3, he deployed crew of a drifting ice station. In 1938, Molokov was appointed head of the Air Fleet Chief Directorate. During the German-Soviet War, he was appointed at October 9, 1941 authorized representative of the State Defence Committee on the creation of ALSIB - classified ferrying route for aircraft from Fairbanks to Krasnoyarsk.

For a short period he headed the Gromov Flight Research Institute (1942–1943).

Later (since 1943) Molokov commanded the 213th Night Bomber Aviation Division on the Western and 3rd Belorussian Fronts. In 1947, he was withdrawn to reserve.

He has died in 1982. Molokov is buried in Moscow, in Kuntsevo Cemetery.

Vasily Molokov's son, Valery (born at October 3, 1924), World War II veteran, graduated from Bauman Moscow State Technical University, worked in aerospace industry.

== Honours and awards ==
- Hero of the Soviet Union
- Three Orders of Lenin
- Two Orders of the Red Banner
- Order of Suvorov 2nd class
- Order of Kutuzov 2nd class
- Order of the Patriotic War 1st class
- Order of the Red Star,
- campaign and jubilee medals

== Memory ==
- In 1934 his birthplace, Irininskoye, was renamed to Molokovo.
- In 1935 a postmark, dedicated to Vasily Molokov, was issued in USSR.
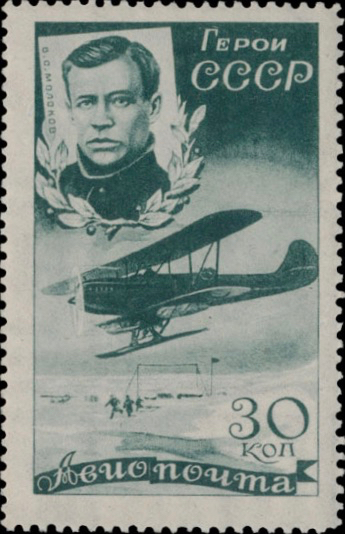
  USSR postmark, 1935.
- A statue was installed in 2010 at his birthplace to commemorate his 115th birthday.
- Molokov Cape at Franz Jozef Land was named after him.
- Molokov Island at Yenisei River.
- Ulitsa Molokova (Molokov Street) In Moscow, Krasnoyarsk, Ekaterinburg.
