= Kolyuchin Island =

Island in the Chukchi Sea

Kolyuchin
Russian: Остров Колючин Chukot: Кувлючьин Central Siberian Yupik: Кулусик
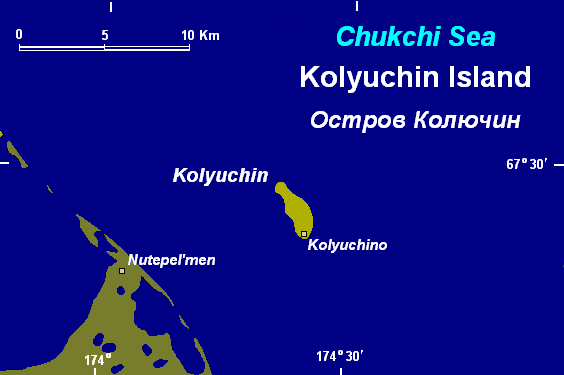
- Kolyuchin Island

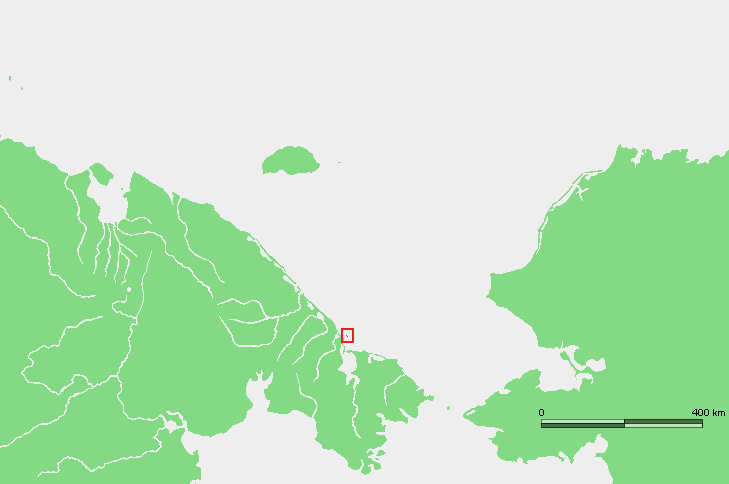
- Location of Kolyuchin Island

Geography
- Coordinates: 67°28′N 174°37′W
- Length: 4.5 km (2.8 mi)
- Width: 1.5 km (0.93 mi)

Administration
- Russia

Demographics
- Population: 0

Kolyuchin Island or Koliuchin Island (Russian: Остров Колючин, Chukot: Кувлючьин, romanized: Kuvlyuch'in) is a small island in the Chukchi Sea. It is not far from the coast, being only 11 km (6.8 mi) from the northern shore of the Chukotka Peninsula. Its latitude is 67° 28' N and its longitude 174° 37' W.

This island is 4.5 km (2.8 mi) in length and its maximum width is 1.5 km (0.93 mi). It is covered with tundra vegetation. There was a small Chukchi settlement on the southern end of the island called Kolyuchino but as of 1987, there was no village and very rare traces of former human presence such as separate logs and coals.

On the nearby shore there is the settlement of Nutepel'men, located north of the Rypatynonel'gyn Lagoon and south of the Pyngopil'gyn Lagoon. Kolyuchinskaya Bay, further south, is named after Kolyuchin Island. Administratively this island and its surrounding area belongs to the Chukotka Autonomous Okrug of the Russian Federation.

== Etymology ==
The Russian name of the island comes from a corruption of the Chukchi word Кувлючьин (Kuvlyuch'in) – "round". In the Chaplino dialect of the Central Siberian Yupik language its name is Кулусик (Kulusik) – "separate ice floe". When the island was visited by James Cook during an expedition, he named it Burney's Island.

== History ==
In September 1933, the Soviet ice-breaker Chelyuskin was crushed by pack ice near Kolyuchin Island. The passengers and crew were rescued by air in a much publicised operation led by Captain Vladimir Voronin and expedition leader Otto Schmidt.

In 1943, a polar research station was transferred from Cape Dzhenretlen to the western part of the island, staffed by 3-4 people by the late 1980s. The last director of the station, Alexey Spasskin, launched an amateur radio service from the island in 1989 with the call name УЖ1ПОЛ/УА10 and the callsign АС65. The station was ultimately closed in February 1992. In September 2025, drone footage revealed that the research station has now been taken over by a group of polar bears.

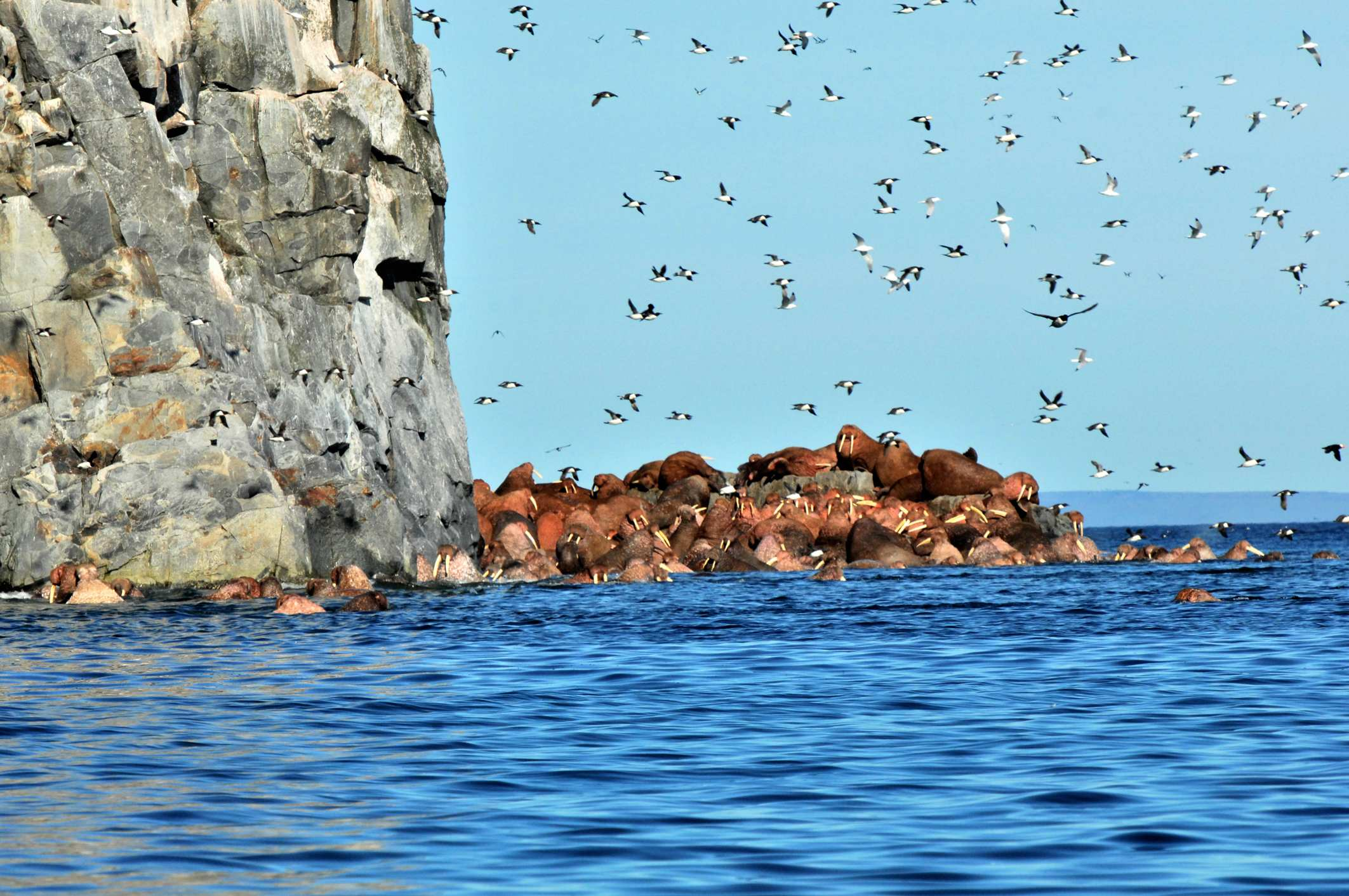
Kolyuchin Island: Walrus herds,
thick-billed murres and kittiwakes

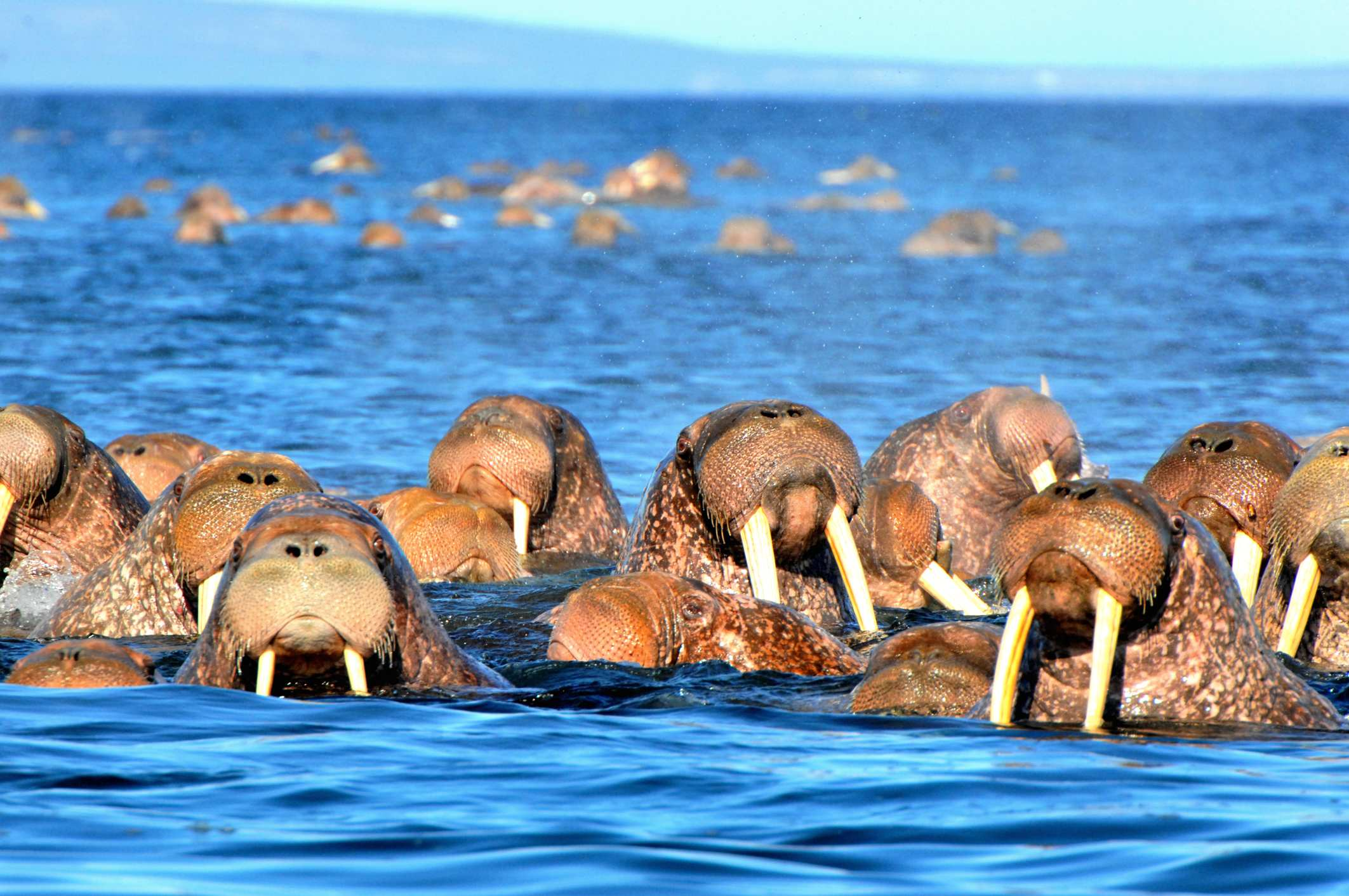
Kolyuchin Island: Walrus herds
near the island

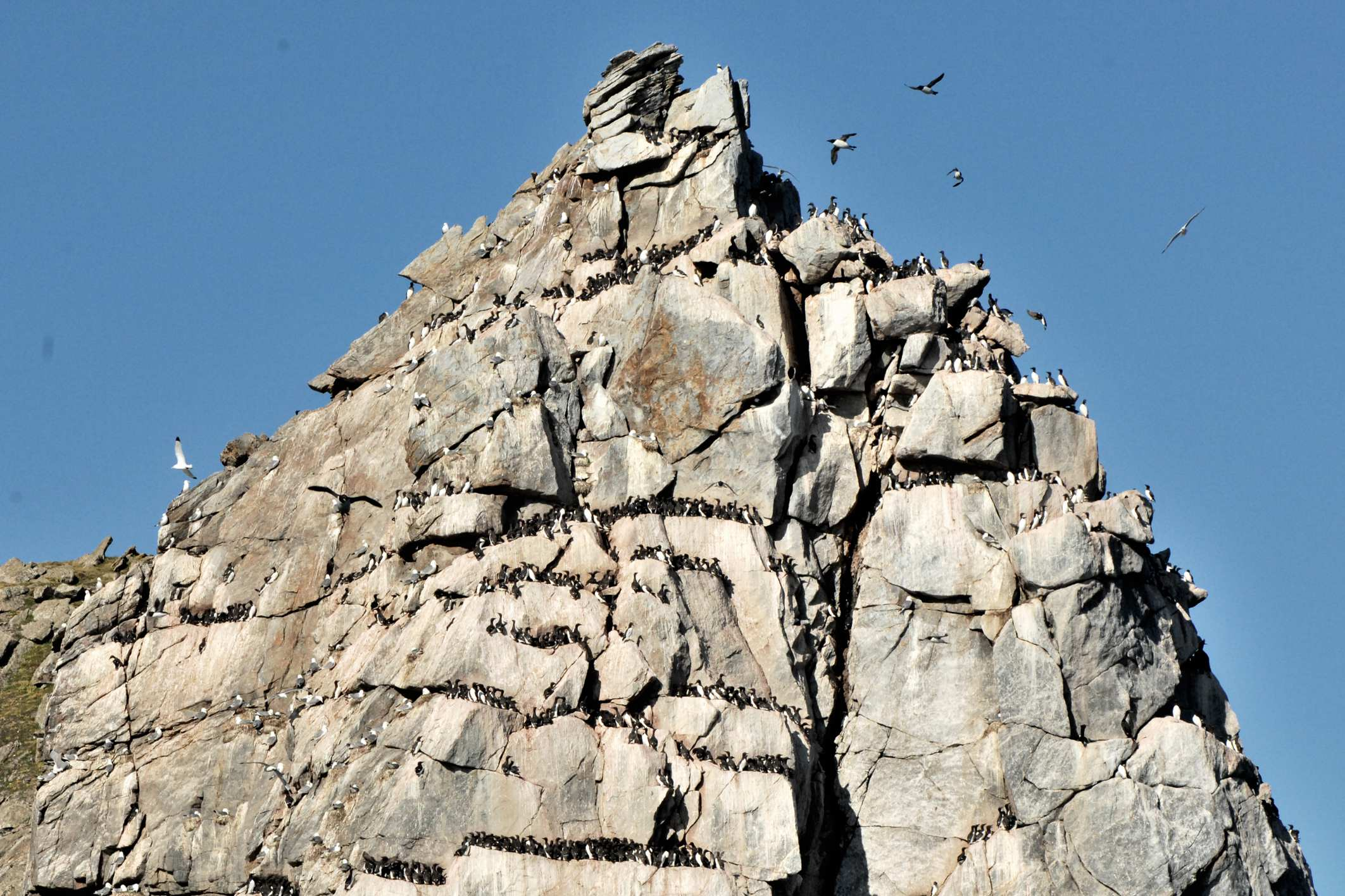
Kolyuchin Island: Bird rock
with thick-billed murres and kittiwakes

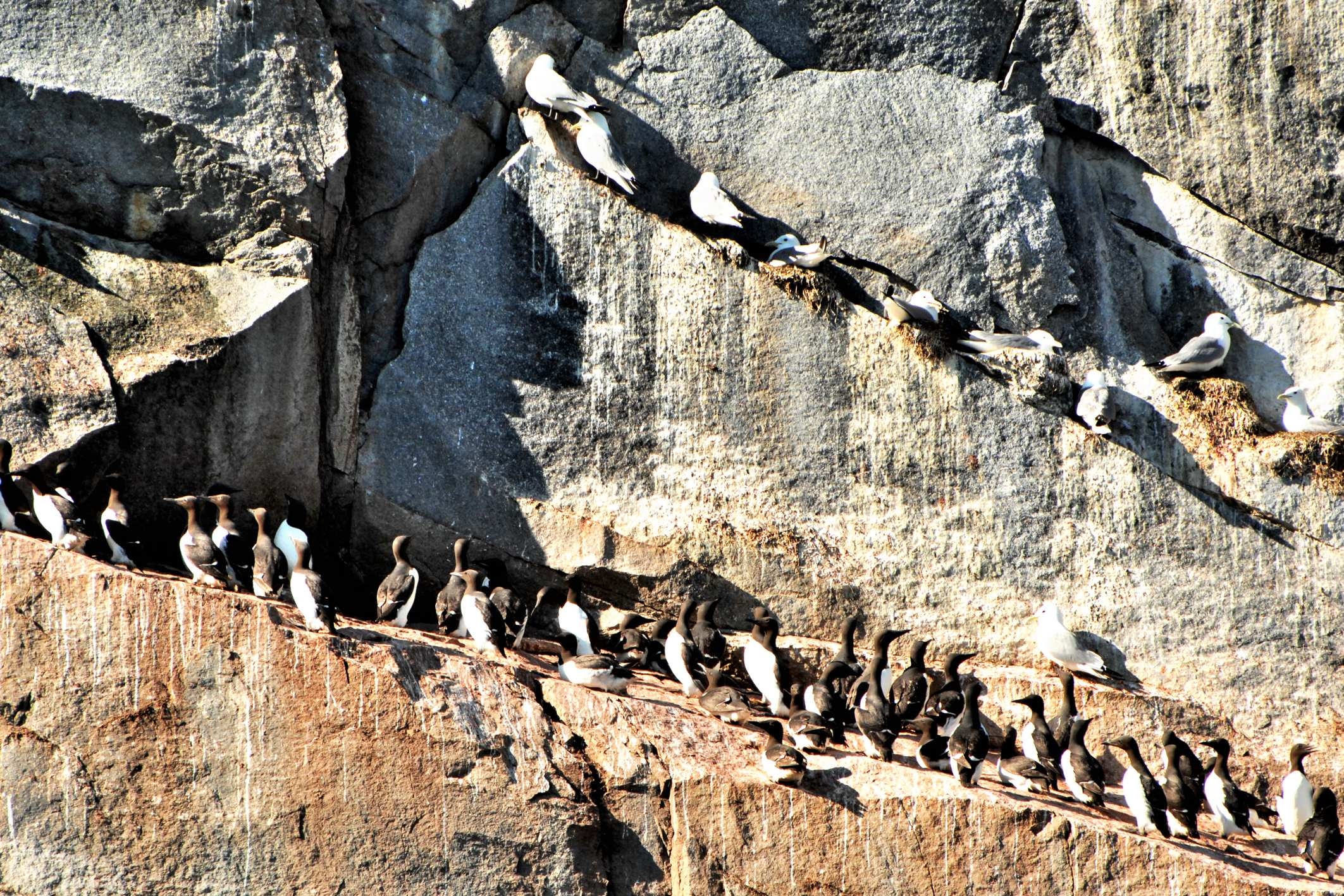
Kolyuchin Island: Bird rock
with thick-billed murres and kittiwakes

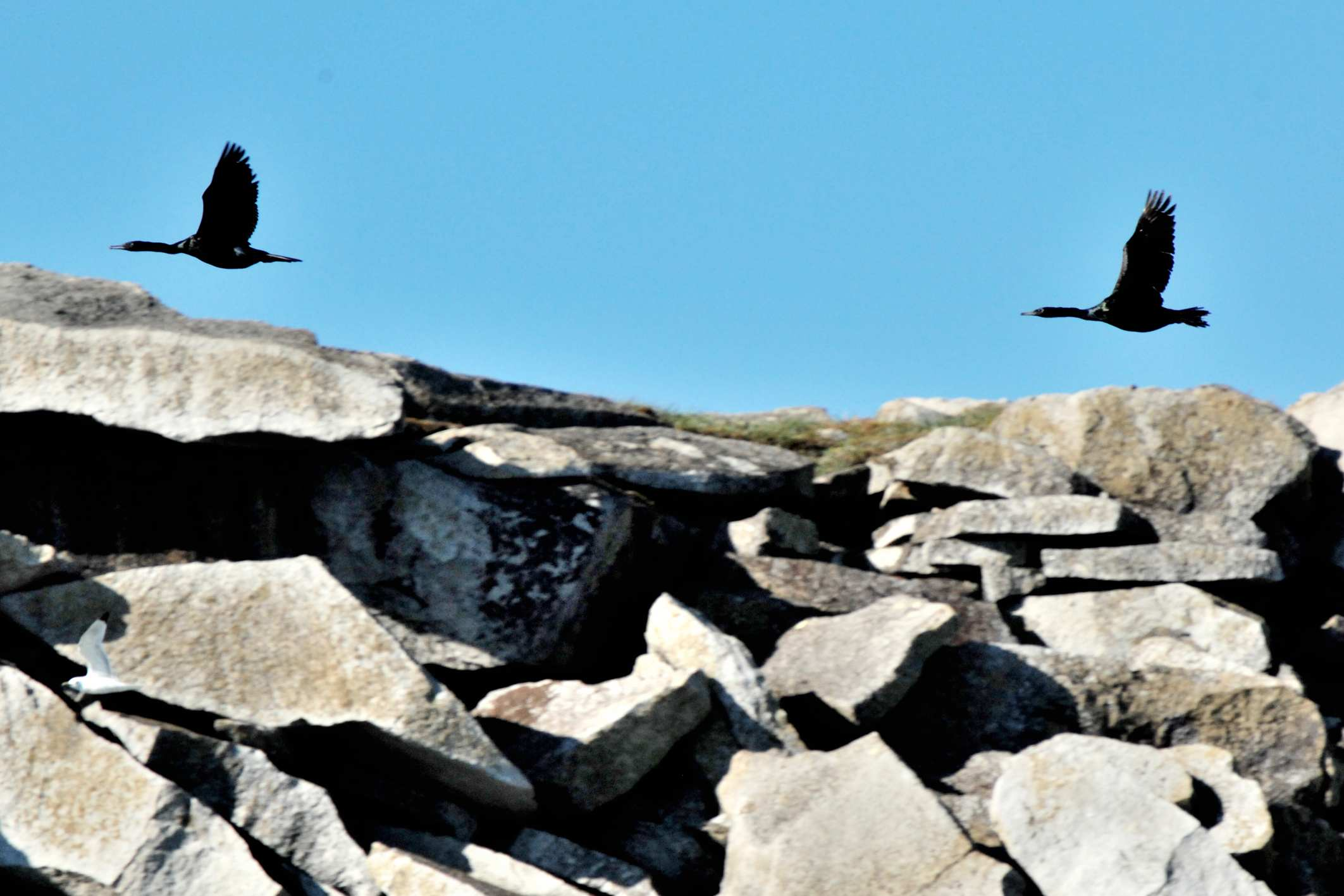
Kolyuchin Island:
Pelagic or Baird's cormorants (Phalacrocorax pelagicus)
crossing the rocks

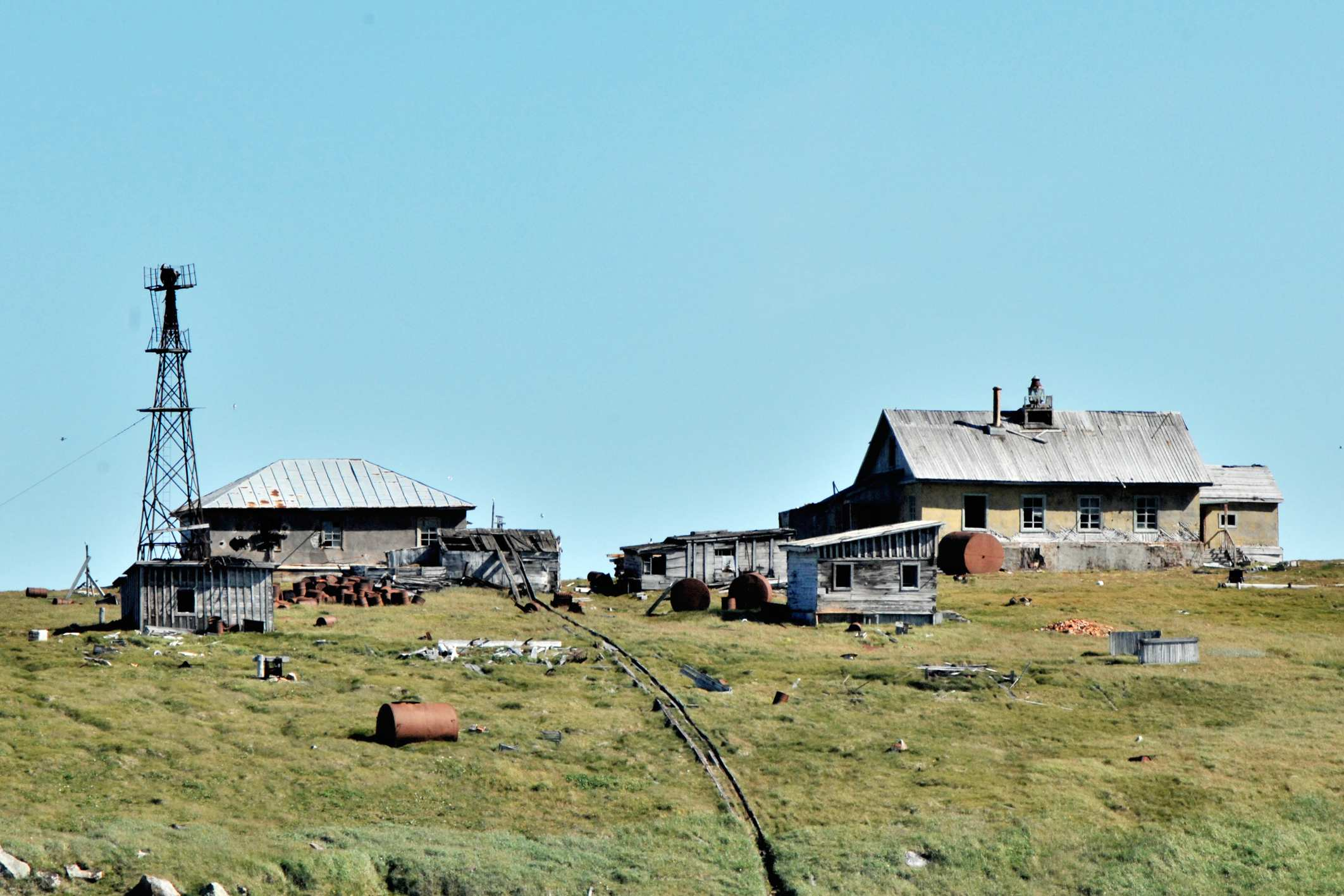
Kolyuchin Island:
Abandoned polar station 2013

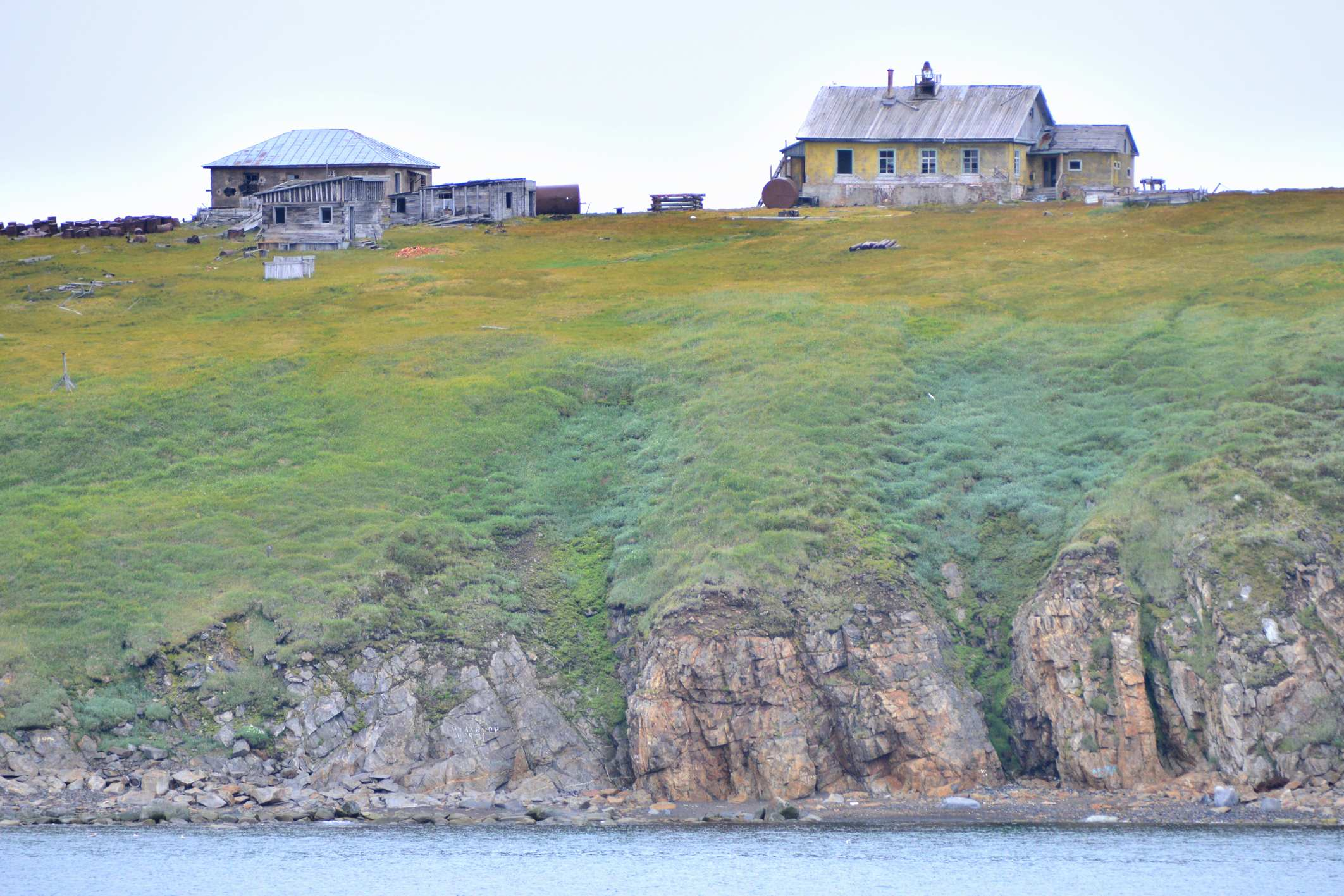
Kolyuchin Island:
Abandoned polar station 2014

== See also ==
- Chukchi Sea
- List of islands of Russia
- List of research stations in the Arctic
