= Anatoliy Nasedkin =

Soviet painter (1924–1994)

- Born: 22 April 1924; Veliky Novgorod, Novgorod Oblast, Russian SFSR, Soviet Union
- Died: 26 July 1994 (aged 70); Kharkiv, Ukraine
- Known for: Painter
- Awards: Merited Artist of the Ukrainian SSR, Shevchenko National Prize

Anatoliy Leonidovich Nasiedkin (Russian: Анатолий Леонидович Наседкин, April 22, 1924 – July 26, 1994) was a Soviet painter. He graduated from the Kharkiv Institute of Arts in 1951. In 1985, he was awarded the Shevchenko National Prize.

The roots of his art come from Russian and Ukrainian culture. Although born in Veliky Novgorod, he spent almost all his life in Kharkiv, Ukraine.

== Childhood ==
Anatoly Leonidovich Nasedkin was born in Veliky Novgorod in 1924. His parents, Leonid Efimovich and Nina Petrovna Nasedkin, had four children. Their eldest was a son named Valentine, followed by twin daughters Lena and Olga—Lena died at the age of three. The youngest child in the family was Anatoly.

Anatoly's grandfather had a great influence on the formation of a future artist. He came from a family of merchants, but he was known throughout the city as a good engineer and mechanic. He was well-educated, knew four foreign languages, and had a rich home library. Despite his harsh nature, he was trying to give a sense of love for literature and knowledge to his children and grandchildren. In the grandfather's library, small Anatoly took his pencil and paper for the first time to redraw pictures from books.

From an early age, he loved everything that was connected with ancient Novgorod, where he lived until the age of six before moving to Kharkiv. "My discovery of the world took place on the Volga. While my further biography was related to Kharkiv, where the family moved in the early thirties," Nasedkin said later.

In the early thirties, the economic crisis took place in the country. Looking for work in 1934, Leonid Nasedkin went to Kharkiv, and soon he called there his new home.

Nasedkin studied in the men's gymnasium. Most of all, he liked history and literature. A childhood love for Maxim Gorky's works, Taras Shevchenko's poetry books, and those written by Hryhorii Skovoroda and Ivan Franko led to a later series of paintings, engravings and lithographs, which he devoted to the writers and their works. These included "Seeing Gorky off Nizhniy Novgorod", "M. Gorky at the grave of Taras Shevchenko," "Gorky and Stasov in the Repin’s studio" and "Franko sheltering the persecuted peasants". But most of all, in his youth, Nasedkin liked to draw. He drew every free moment, even sometimes running away from school to the forest or river to draw something from nature.

Nasedkin often frequented the Kharkiv Art Museum, enjoying the work of Bryullov, Aivazovsky, Shishkin, Nikolai Ge, Korovin, and Surikov. In the early 30s, great works of I. Repin were added to the museum's collection. These were "Reply of the Zaporozhian Cossacks" and "Cossack in Steppe" which became some of young Nasedkin’s favourite. Later, Nasedkin always considered himself to be a follower of the Russian classical art of Repin and Stasov.

In his 12th year, Nasedkin entered the art studio in the Pioneers Palace in Kharkiv. He walked there on foot through the whole city two times a week. This art studio became his first professional school of painting. Many exhibitions took place there. One was dedicated to the North Pole-1, the first Soviet expedition to the North Pole. The legendary "polar people," Ivan Papanin and Ernst Krenkel, came to the Pioneer's Palace. Inspired by this meeting, Nasedkin drew a picture, "Papanintsi," which was published in the anthology "Schasliva yunist" in 1938. After that, it was presented in the VDNKh exhibition in Moscow, where Anatoly was awarded a certificate from VDNKh USSR. This was the first recognition of his artistic creativity. "The Pioneers Palace played a decisive role in my life, in choosing my profession. In the Pioneer's Palace, I met art and fell in love with it for all my life," said the painter.

Soon, his father died. Nina Petrovna had to raise her children alone. She sewed while working at home. Anatoly had just finished the 9th grade; his drawings were marked by the well-known artists of Kharkiv. But war began.

In the summer of 1941, the Nasedkin family saw off Valentin (Anatoly's elder brother) to the front, but after a few months, they received a notice that Valentin was missing.

In 1943, Kharkiv was recaptured, and Nasedkin joined the army as a volunteer. During the Battle of Kursk, ⁣Anatoliy got seriously wounded. Long months in the field hospital and then in the hospitals of Tula, Moscow, and Sverdlovsk passed. He returned to civilian life in 1945. A medal "For Valour", which he received during that fight when he was seriously wounded, was the dearest of all the awards.

== Work ==
Even at the front, Nasedkin never parted with his album and pencil. When he returned to Kharkiv, he continued to improve his painting. In 1946, Anatoly entered the Kharkiv Art Institute, where he was taught by famous masters M.G. Deregus and H.E. Svetlichny. There, he became a professional artist. Nasedkin graduated in 1951, specializing in panel painting.

In 1957, Nasedkin met Irina Igorevna Tikhova and got married the year after. In 1961, their daughter Victoria was born, causing Irina to be forced to stop working. She devoted all her life to her husband and family.

Nasedkin's work was "under the sign" of A. M. Gorky. Nasedkin studied Gorky's wandering routes, followed in his footsteps along the rivers Vetluga and Kerzhenets, and visited the Middle Volga. He painted landscapes and made sketches for future paintings. As a result, we know such works as Seeing Gorky Off Nizhny Novgorod in 1901 (1955), which was purchased for the permanent exhibition by the Central Gorky Museum in Moscow; Song of the Working Gang (1957); M. Gorky at the Grave of Taras Shevchenko (1961), which is stored at the Shevchenko National Reserve in Kaniv; M. Gorky and F. Chaliapin, etc.

History was not Nasedkin's only subject of interest. He also depicted contemporary events and public figures. In the spring and summer of 1961, he painted a work depicting the reception of Yuri Gagarin following his return from the first human spaceflight. The painting shows a crowd welcoming Gagarin. The work was exhibited at the Republican Exhibition in Kyiv and later at the All-Union Exhibition in Moscow.

In the 1960s, pictures on historical and revolutionary themes took the most important place in Ukrainian art. Nasedkin began working on the theme of the first years of Soviet power. Three paintings – To the Kolkhoz! (1960), Bread of Revolution (1965), and Food Squad (Requisition) (1967) – became a kind of triptych.

In 1968, the work Food Squad (Requisition) appeared at the all-union and republican exhibitions. Anatoly Nasedkin received the title of Merited Artist. For the works about the village, Anatoly Nasedkin was awarded the Shevchenko National Prize in 1985. Many years passed before Nasedkin felt himself able to create a work devoted to the military theme – the painting "No Land Beyond the Volga" (1975). "In No Land Beyond the Volga I showed a soldier of Stalingrad. For a long time, I was searching for a person who could reflect heroic traits of all the people who won the mortal combat," he said.

In 1975, the artist decided to talk about himself on the canvas. Self Portrait, written this year, is the image of a man – the creator, shown in a moment of deep reflection. The artist chose a very simple sitting position, modest, quiet, neutral grey-blue with a black shade of colorful range, which would harmonize with his psychological condition.

In general, the genre of the portrait attracted the artist no less than easel painting. In the family archive, there is a set of portraits of peasants, workers, students, and friends of the artist. Portraits of A.L. Nasedkin's family members (portraits of his mother, sister, niece, wife, daughter, son-in-law, and granddaughters) take a particular place. They constitute a unique pedigree.

In 1976, in Kharkiv and then in Kyiv, a successful exhibition of Nasedkin's works took place. It became a kind of summary of his twenty-five years' work. He was recognized as one of the best representatives of the Kharkiv art school.

From the early 1970s to the end of his life, Nasedkin was fond of still lives and landscapes. He liked to convey the freshness and beauty of a just-collected bouquet of wildflowers, or a momentary state of nature, or the dynamics of motion, colour, and composition, which characterised the spirit of time. Kharkiv's urban scenes featured significantly in his works at this time, including The Road to Shatilovka (1958), Construction of the Pioneer Pool (1970), First Snow (1971), View of Lenin Street (1981), and View of the Kolomenskaya Street (1982).

In the early 1990s, he returned to the theme of Shevchenko again. The artist began several large-scale canvases dedicated to the great Kobzar, making many sketches. Many invitations to the new exhibitions came from England, France, and Japan in the late 80s and early 1990s. Having celebrated his 70th anniversary, the artist was full of energy and plans. But on July 26, 1994, Nasedkin died.

== Works ==
- To kolkhoz (1960)
- Bred of Revolution (1965)
- Food Squad (Requisition) (1967)
