= Nikolay Zubov =

Nikolay Zubov may refer to:

- Nikolay Alexandrovich Zubov (1763-1805), Russian nobleman
- Nikolay Nikolaevich Zubov (1885-1960), Russian naval officer and oceanographer
- Nikolay Zubov (icebreaker), see Project 23550 patrol ship
