= Purga =

Purga may refer to following:

== People ==
- Heidy Purga (born 1975), Estonian journalist and politician
- Purga (drag queen)

== Places ==
- Purga, Estonia
- Purga, Queensland
- Purga, Slovenia

== Ships ==
- Purga-class patrol ship, type of ship operated by the Russian Coast Guard
- Purga (icebreaker), several ships
- Soviet trawler Purga

== See also ==
- Purgaz
