= Purga (icebreaker) =

Purga (Russian: Пурга, lit. 'blizzard') may refer to one of the following icebreakers:

- Purga (1957) a Soviet icebreaking patrol ship
- Purga (1960), a Soviet diesel-electric icebreaker built
- Purga (2022), a Russian Project 23550 icebreaking patrol ship

== Other ==
- Purga-class patrol ship, a series of ice-strengthened patrol ships (none of which is named Purga)
