= Project 23550 patrol ship =

Russian naval ship class

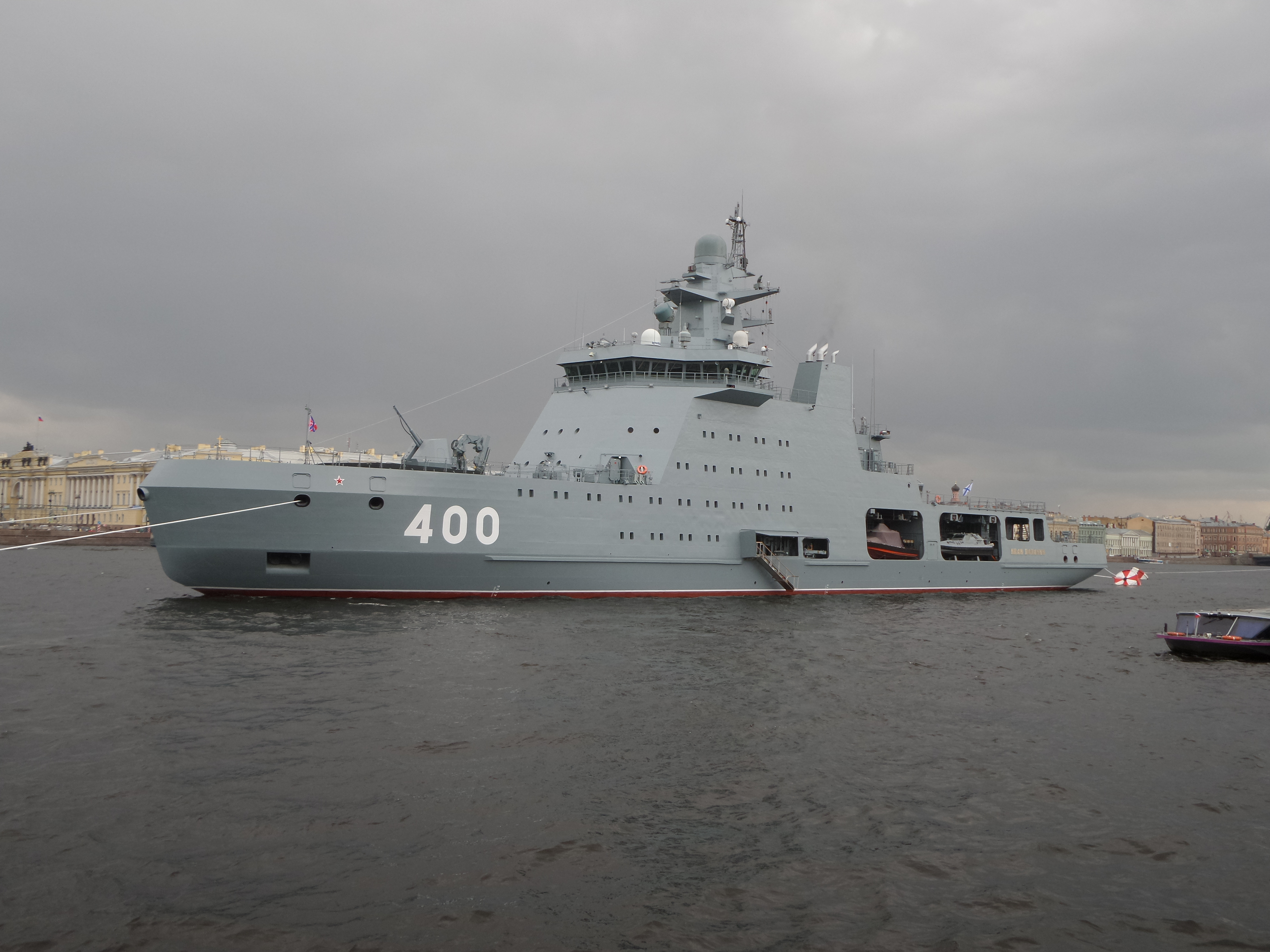
- Ivan Papanin in July 2024

Class overview
- Builders: Admiralty Shipyards, St. Petersburg; Vyborg Shipyard, Vyborg
- Operators: Russian Navy; Russian Coast Guard
- Preceded by: Ivan Susanin class; Purga class
- Built: 2017–present
- In commission: September 2025
- Planned: 4
- Building: 3
- Completed: 1
- Active: 1

General characteristics
- Type: Icebreaking patrol ship
- Displacement: 6,800 t (6,700 long tons; 7,500 short tons) standard; 8,500 t (8,400 long tons; 9,400 short tons) full load
- Length: 114 m (374 ft 0 in)
- Beam: 18 m (59 ft 1 in)
- Draught: 6 m (19 ft 8 in)
- Ice class: RS Arc7
- Installed power: 4 × Kolomna 28-9DG diesel generators (4 × 3,500 kW)
- Propulsion: Diesel–electric propulsion; two shafts (2 × 6,300 kW); Two bow thrusters
- Speed: 18 knots (33 km/h; 21 mph)
- Range: 10,000 nmi (19,000 km; 12,000 mi) at 10 knots (19 km/h; 12 mph)
- Complement: 60 core crew + 50 extra mission crew
- Armament: 1 × 76.2 mm (3 in) AK-176MA naval gun; 2 or 4 × 12.7 mm Kord machine guns; 2 × 30 mm AK-630M CIWS ("Ermak" type); 8 × 3M-54 Kalibr missiles ("Arktika" type)
- Aviation facilities: Helipad and hangar for Ka-27 helicopter

Project 23550 is a class of armed icebreaking patrol ships under construction for the Russian Navy. Two ships were ordered from Saint Petersburg-based Admiralty Shipyards in 2016. The ships are designed to patrol the Russian territorial waters and exclusive economic zone in the Arctic. The ships are also referred as "Arktika" type (Russian: шифр «Арктика», lit. 'codename Arctic').

During the launching ceremony of the lead ship, it was announced that two additional ships of slightly revised design would be built for the FSB Border Service of Russia by Vyborg Shipyard. The derivative design is also referred to as "Ermak" type (Russian: шифр «Ермак», lit. 'codename Yermak').

== Design ==
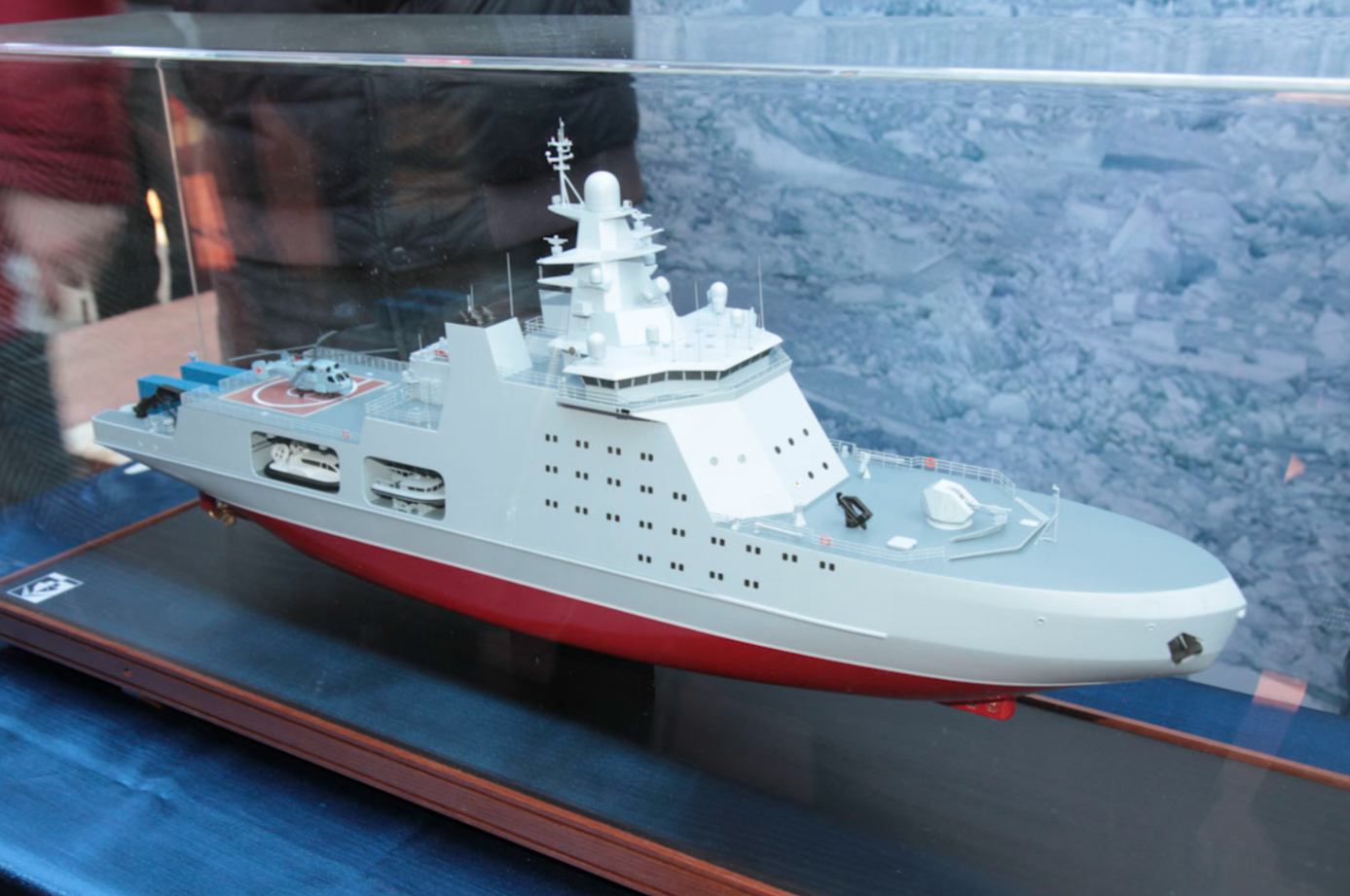
Scale model of the Project 23550 patrol ship

Project 23550 patrol ships have a planned displacement of 8,500 tonnes (8,400 long tons; 9,400 short tons), a length of 114 metres (374 ft 0 in) and a draught of 6 metres (19 ft 8 in). The ships will be equipped with two Raptor-class patrol boats, a Ka-27 helicopter and small hovercraft. The core crew is planned at 60 with accommodation for an additional 50 mission specialists. Armament will include a 76-millimeter (3 in) naval gun (some sources state a 100 mm (3.9 in) naval gun) and 3M-54 Kalibr anti-ship missiles in the Club-K container variant.

Project 23550 will have an integrated electric propulsion with four 3,500-kilowatt (4,700 hp) Kolomna 28-9DG main diesel gensets consisting of 16-cylinder 10D49 diesel engines driving alternators produced by Ruselprom. In addition, the ships will have two auxiliary diesel gensets with Kolomna diesel engines and Ruselprom alternators. While the early concept featured ABB Azipod azimuthing propulsion units, the final design has two conventional shaft lines, propellers and rudders. The 6,300-kilowatt (8,400 hp) propulsion motors will be produced by Ruselprom. The ships will have an endurance of 70 days and a range of 10,000 nautical miles (19,000 km; 12,000 mi) at economic speed of 10 knots (19 km/h; 12 mph). Their maximum speed is 18 knots (33 km/h; 21 mph).

The vessels are strengthened for navigation in ice-covered arctic seas according to the Russian Maritime Register of Shipping ice class Arc7. They are designed to break ice up to 1.7 metres (5 ft 7 in) thick.

Think tank Global Security pointed out several similarities between the Project 23550 design and NoCGV Svalbard, and Canada's Harry DeWolf class. All three class are of approximately the same displacement, capable of transitting similar thickness of ice and have similar size crews, with room for mission specialist.

In 2020, it was announced that the Russian Navy would begin sea trials to test the installation of module containers on patrol vessels permitting such ships to carry significantly upgraded armaments tailored to different missions. The containers were envisaged to carry various weapons including sonars and torpedoes or anti-ship and cruise missiles.

== Notable events ==
On 25 March 2026, one of the Project 23550 patrol ships under construction at Vyborg Shipyard (likely Purga) was damaged in what has been reported as a Ukrainian attack.

== Ships in class ==
Name	Russian	Namesake	Builder	IMO number	Laid down	Launched	Commissioned	Status
Russian Navy ("Arktika" type)
Ivan Papanin	Иван Папанин	Ivan Dmitrievich Papanin	Admiralty Shipyards, Saint Petersburg	9898151	19 April 2017	25 October 2019	5 September 2025	In service
Nikolay Zubov	Николай Зубов	Nikolay Nikolaevich Zubov	Admiralty Shipyards, Saint Petersburg	9898163	27 November 2019	25 December 2024	2024 (original plan)	Launched
Coast Guard of the FSB Border Service ("Ermak" type)
Purga	Пурга	Russian for "blizzard"	Vyborg Shipyard, Vyborg	9916599	25 July 2020	7 October 2022	?	Launched; likely damaged in Ukrainian drone attack in March 2026
Dzerzhinsky	Дзержинский	Felix Edmundovich Dzerzhinsky	Vyborg Shipyard, Vyborg	4775976	22 December 2023			Under construction
