= Ivan Papanin =

Soviet explorer (1894–1986)

- Иван Папанин
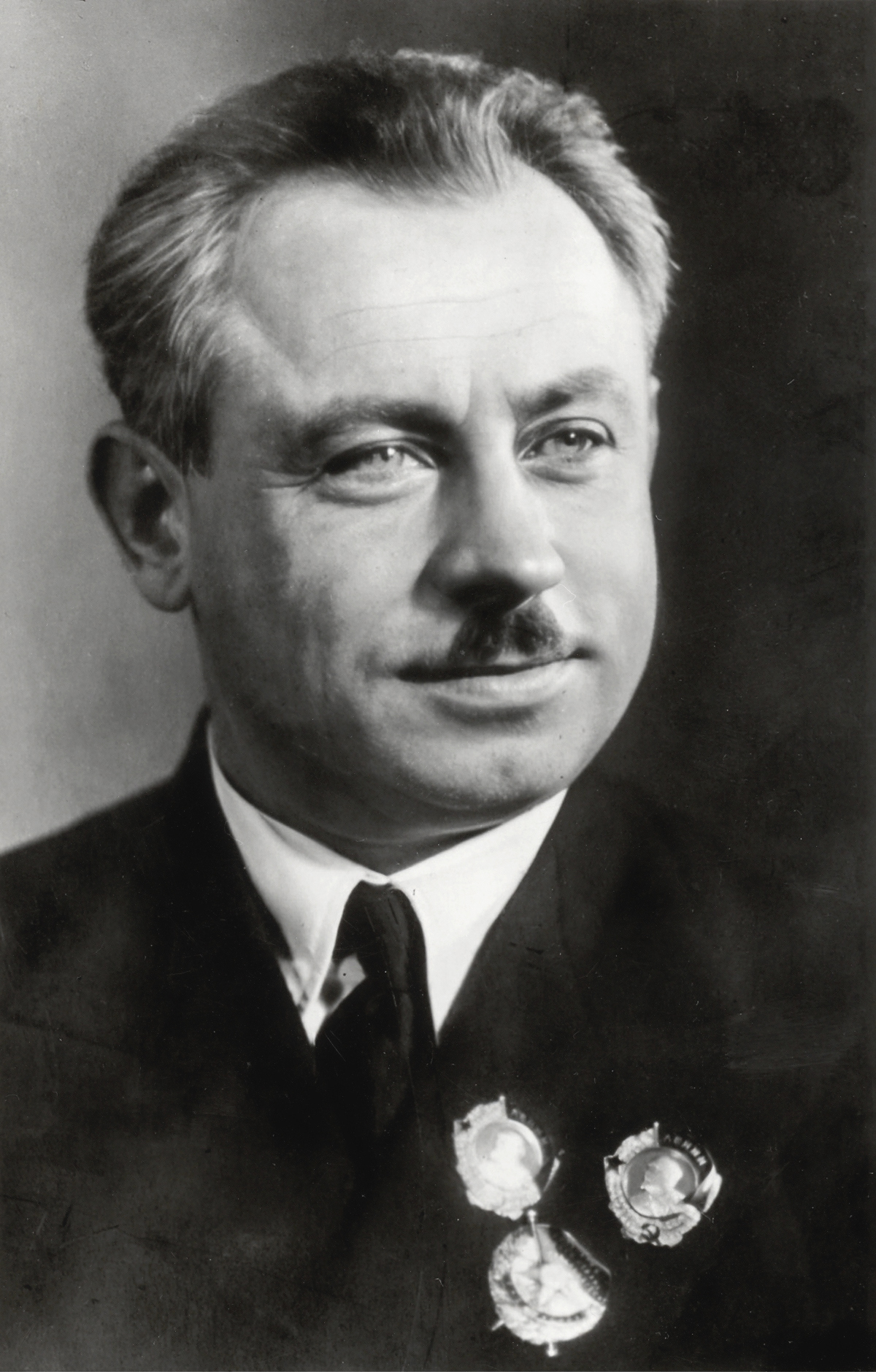
- Papanin in 1950
- Born: Ivan Dmitriyevich Papanin; 26 November 1894; Sevastopol, Russian Empire
- Died: 30 January 1986 (aged 91); Moscow, Soviet Union
- Occupations: Polar explorer, scientist, security officer

Ivan Dmitriyevich Papanin (Russian: Иван Дмитриевич Папанин; 26 November [O.S. 14 November] 1894 – 30 January 1986) was a Soviet polar explorer, scientist, Counter admiral, and twice Hero of the Soviet Union, who was awarded nine Orders of Lenin.

== Life and career ==
=== Early life and participation in the Russian Civil War ===
Papanin was born in Sevastopol into the family of a sailor of Crimean Greek origin. In 1909 he graduated Zemskaya elementary school.

In 1914 he was conscripted into the Imperial Russian Navy. He took part in the Russian Civil War on the Bolshevik side, fighting in Ukraine. In 1920 he was sent to Crimea to organize a guerrilla movement against the forces of the White movement leader, Baron Pyotr Wrangel.

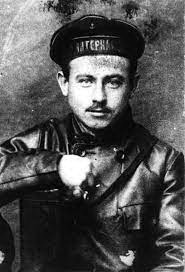
Ivan Papanin in 1918

In November 1920, after the Bolshevik takeover of Crimea, Papanin was appointed prosecutor and commandant of the Crimean branch of the Soviet secret police, the Cheka. Rosalia Zemlyachka, organizer of the partisan movement in Crimea, is reported to have been his superior and friend. In 1922 he received his first Soviet award, the order of the Red Banner for exemplary performing a task in liquidation of counterrevolutionaries in Crimea, Kharkiv, and other places.

=== As a polar explorer ===
In 1923, he worked for the Narkomat of Communications. In 1929 Papanin finished the Osoaviakhim special courses. In 1931-1932 he graduated from the People's Commissariat for Posts and Telegraphs higher courses in communications and the first course of the Planning Academy department of communications. In 1931, he took part in the expedition of the icebreaker Malygin to Franz Josef Land. Between 1932 and 1933, he was the head of a polar expedition on Tikhaya Bay on Franz Josef Land. In 1934-1935 he was in command of a polar station on Cape Chelyuskin.

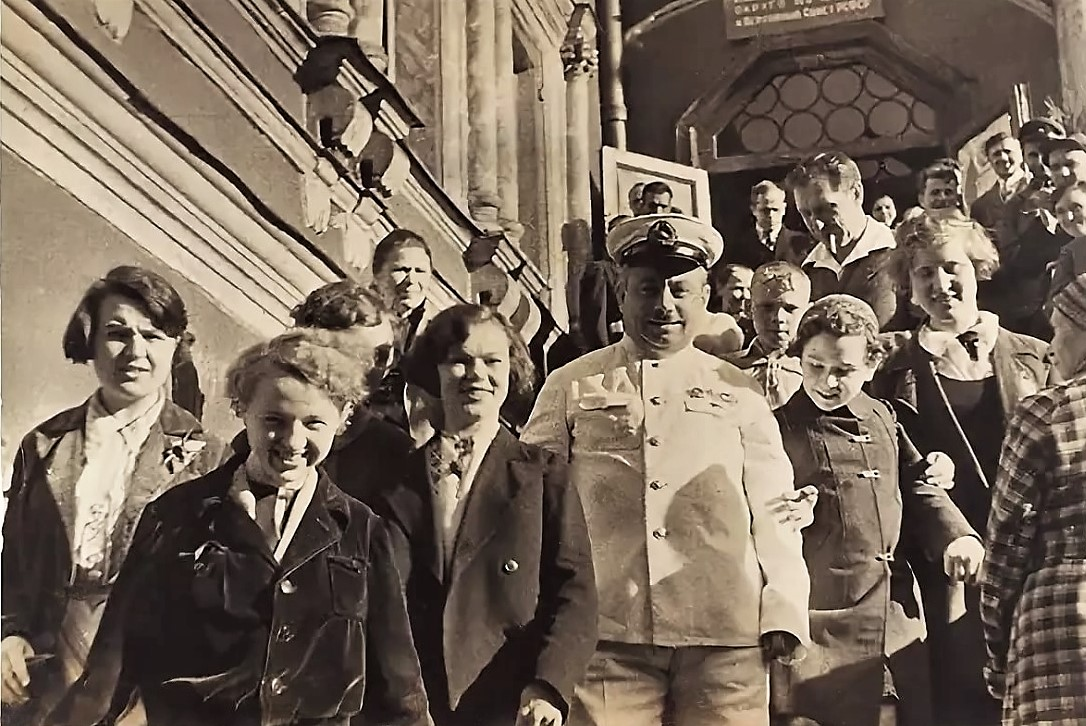
Ivan Papanin in June 1938.

In 1937, he was in charge of the famous North Pole-1 expedition. Four researchers, Ivan Papanin, Ernst Krenkel, Yevgeny Fyodorov and Pyotr Shirshov, landed on the drifting ice-floes in an airplane flown by Mikhail Vodopyanov. For 234 days, Papanin's team carried out a wide range of scientific observations in the near-polar zone, until they were taken back by the two icebreakers Murman and Taimyr. It was the first expedition of its kind in the world. All members of the expedition received the title of Hero of the Soviet Union, which was extremely rare before World War II. All members also received a science degree of Doctor of Geographic Sciences (without dissertation, thesis) and were admitted to the Geographical Society of the USSR. Upon returning from the expedition he published Life on an ice floe: Diary of Ivan Papanin.

In 1939-1946 Papanin was the successor to Otto Schmidt as head of the Glavsevmorput' (Glavniy Severniy Morskoy Put') - an establishment that oversaw all commercial operations on the Northern Sea Route. In 1940 he received a second Hero of the Soviet Union title for organizing the expedition that saved the Sedov. During World War II he was the representative of the State Defence Committee (Gosudarstvennij Komitet Oborony) responsible for all transportation by the Northern Sea Route. Between 1941 and 1952, he was a member of the Central Revision Commission of the Communist Party.

=== Later career ===
Between 1948 and 1951, he was the deputy director of Institute for Oceanology of the Academy of Sciences of the Soviet Union and from 1951 until his death in 1986, he was the Head of the Academy's Department of Maritime Expeditions. Until 1972, he was also the director of the Institute for the Biology of Inland Waters (Bilogii Vnutrennikh Vod).

=== Legacy ===
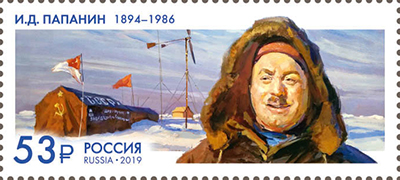
Russian commemorative stamp for Ivan Papanin, 2019

Papanin's name has been given to a cape on the Taymyr Peninsula, a mountain in Antarctica, and an underwater mountain in the Pacific Ocean. His name was also given to an ice-class cargo and research ship (call sign: UCJE) built in 1990 that operates in both Arctic seas and the Antarctic. In October 2019, Russia unveiled an 8,500-tonne, 300-foot-long icebreaking patrol ship named after him at the Admiralty Shipyard in St. Petersburg.

== Honours and awards ==
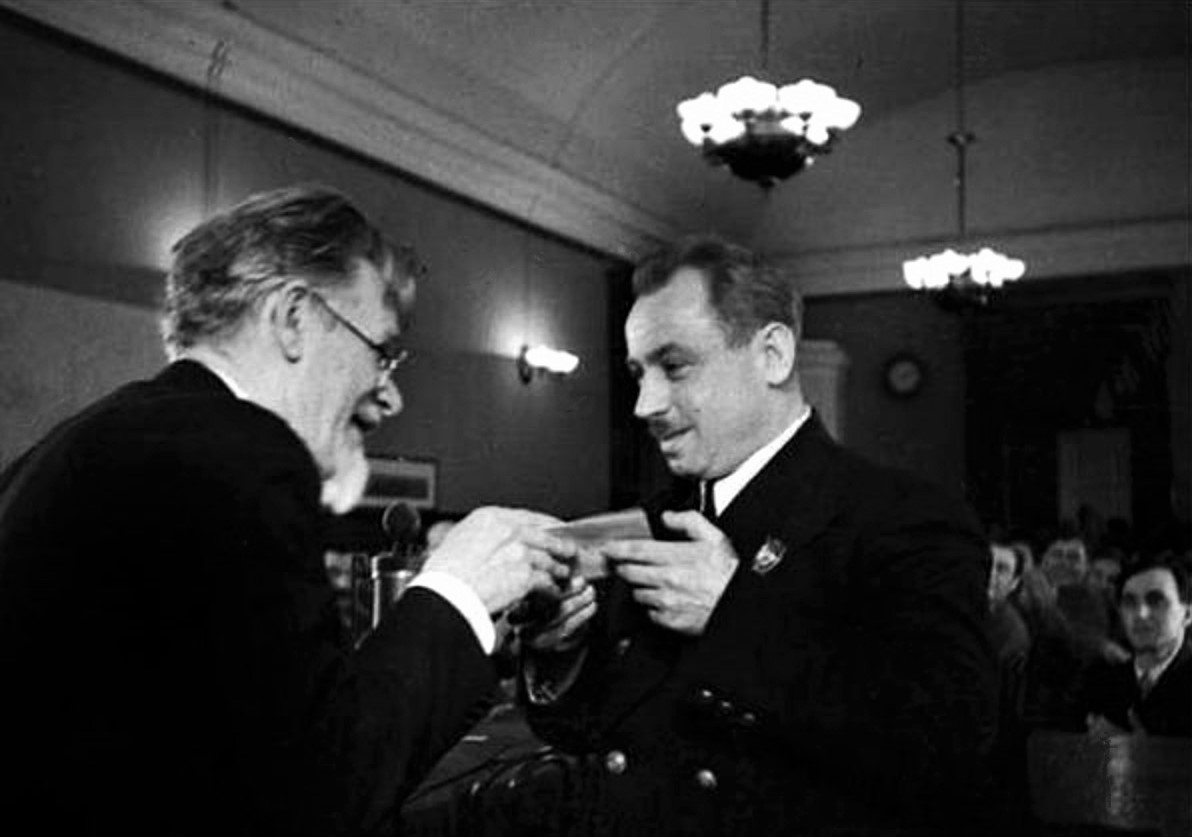
Papanin is receiving his certificate in honoring him as the Hero of the Soviet Union from Mikhail Kalinin (1938)

- Hero of the Soviet Union (1937, 1940)
- 9 Orders of Lenin (1937, 1938, May 1944, November 1944, 1945, 1956, 1964, 1974, 1984)
- Order of the October Revolution (1971)
- Order of the Red Banner, twice (1922, 1950)
- Order of Nakhimov, 1st class (1945)
- Order of the Patriotic War, 1st class (1985)
- Order of the Red Banner of Labour, twice (1955, 1980)
- Order of Friendship of Peoples (1982)
- Order of the Red Star (1945)
- Medal "For Battle Merit" (1944)
- Jubilee Medal "In Commemoration of the 100th Anniversary of the Birth of Vladimir Ilyich Lenin"
- Jubilee Medal "XX Years of the Workers' and Peasants' Red Army"

other medals and foreign decorations.

- Doctor of Geography (1938)
- Rear-Admiral (1943)
- Honorary Citizen of the Hero City of Murmansk (1974), Arkhangelsk (1975), Hero City of Sevastopol (1979), Lipetsk and the Yaroslavl Region
