= Aviaarktika =

Soviet airline near the arctic

- Commenced operations: September 1, 1930
- Ceased operations: January 3, 1960 (absorbed into Aeroflot)
- Operating bases: Omsk; Krasnoyarsk
- Fleet size: See Fleet below
- Headquarters: Krasnoyarsk, USSR (1930–1932); Moscow, USSR (1932–1960)
- Key people: Mark Shevelev

Aviaarktika was a Soviet airline which started operations on 1 September 1930 and was absorbed by Aeroflot on 3 January 1960.

== History ==
Aviaarktika was the flying branch of the Department of Polar Aviation of Glavsevmorput. Its first head was Mark Shevelev and it was originally based in Krasnoyarsk. It moved to Moscow in 1932.

Aviarktika established routes along the rivers and lakes of Siberia and Northern Russia; the Ob River with a base at Omsk, on the Irtysh and Yenisei rivers, with a base at Krasnoyarsk, on the Angara near Lake Baikal at Irkutsk, and at Yakutsk on the Lena.

== Fleet ==
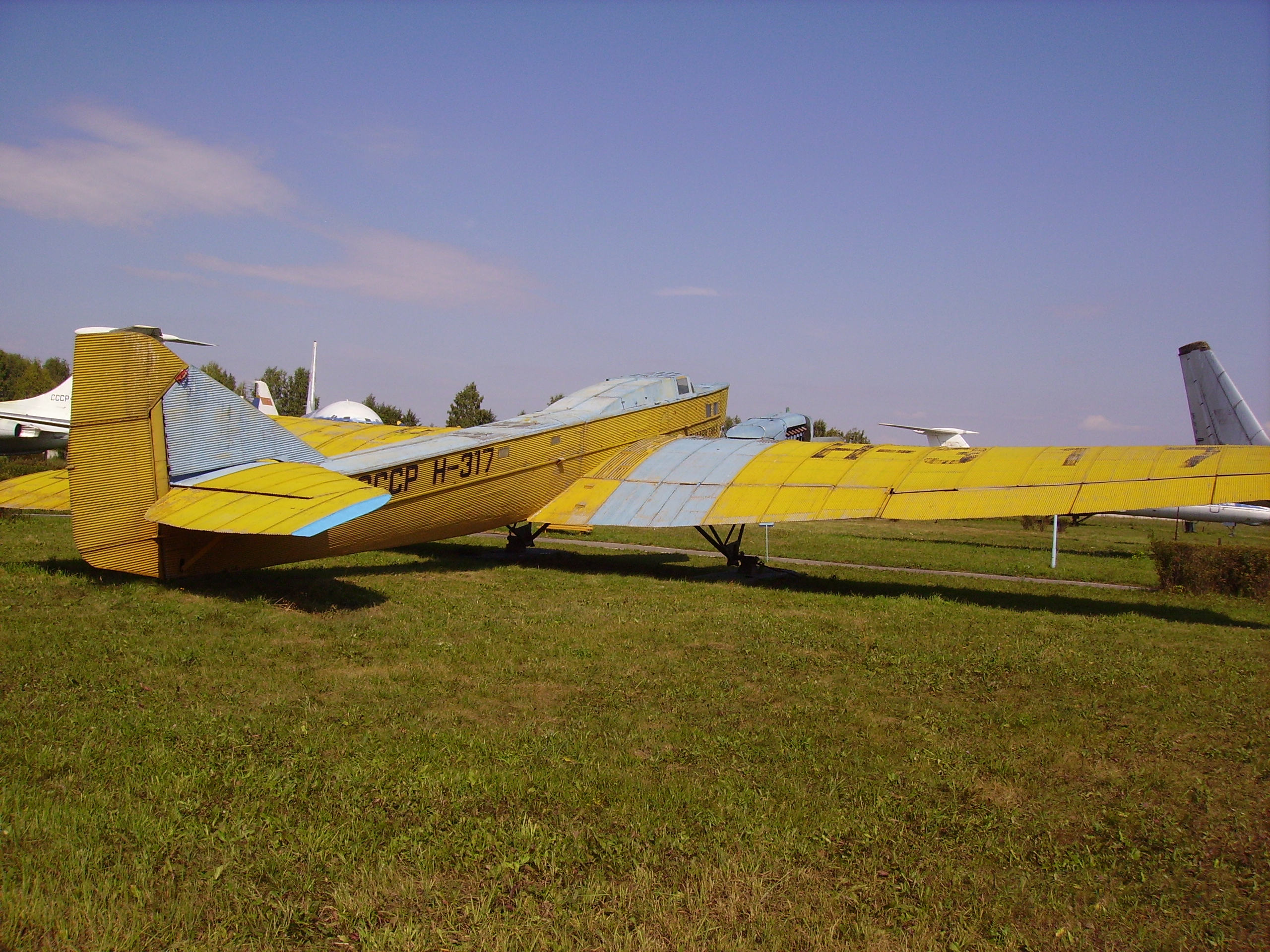
Aviaarktika Tupolev ANT-4 at the Ulyanovsk Aircraft Museum

Initially Aviaarktika flew the Junkers F.13 floatplane and six Dornier Wal flying boats. By 1933 there were 42 aircraft including Tupolev ANT-4 and ANT-6's.

AVIAARKTIKA Tupolev ANT-4, CCCP-H317, currently located at the Ulyanovsk Aircraft Museum in Ulyanovsk Baratayevka Airport (Central) (UWLL), is the only surviving example of the ANT-4. CCCP-H317 crash-landed in Siberian tundra in 1944 and was recovered 39 years later and restored for the museum.

== Accidents and incidents ==
=== 1930s ===
12 July 1933
Savoia-Marchetti S.55 CCCP-Н11 crashed in the Volga River 20 km (12 mi) southwest of Volsk after encountering windshear, killing three of five on board.
12 August 1937
Bolkhovitinov DB-A URSS-Н209 disappeared over the Arctic Ocean, probably over northern Siberia or Alaska, during a transpolar flight from Moscow to New York with six on board, including Sigizmund Levanevsky. Possible wreckage was sighted in 1999.

=== 1940s ===
22 July 1941
Tupolev G-1 CCCP-Н292 stalled and crashed in the Maly Anyuy River near Ostrovnoye on takeoff due to pilot error; all five on board survived.
25 September 1941
Dornier Do J Wal CCCP-Н238 force-landed in tundra between Kolymsky and Chokurdakh, Yakut ASSR due to engine failure; no casualties.
29 September 1941
Tupolev G-1 CCCP-Н289 landed hard on the Anadyr River near Snezhnoye and sank due to pilot error, killing the four crew.
2 December 1941
Polikarpov U-2 CCCP-Н274 crashed 25 km (16 mi) from Anadyr after losing speed while turning due to pilot error, killing both pilots.
28 January 1944
Tupolev G-1 CCCP-Н317 force-landed near Poloy (70 km (43 mi) southwest of Igarka) after the pilot became disorientated in icing conditions, collapsing the landing gear in the process; all eight on board survived. The wreckage was found from the air on February 3. In 1983, the aircraft was relocated and transported by an Mi-6 to Igarka and loaded onto an Il-76 and flown to Vyborg for restoration. In 1985, CCCP-Н317 was completed with engines and cockpit from another crashed G-1, CCCP-Н227. CCCP-Н317 was placed on display at the Ulyanovsk Aircraft Museum and remains the only complete ANT-4.
15 March 1944
Tupolev G-1 CCCP-Н316 crashed near Turukhansk; no casualties.
24 March 1944
Polikarpov U-2SP CCCP-Н335 crashed shortly after takeoff from Yenseisk after the pilot became disorientated in crosswinds; both pilots survived.
1 January 1945
Tupolev G-1 CCCP-Н288 crashed near Rybnoye after the pilot became disorientated in poor visibility (fog); all 13 on board survived.
19 April 1945
Tupolev G-1 CCCP-Н286 crashed on a river bank near Igarka in heavy snow due to crew and ATC errors, killing seven of 13 on board.
5 August 1945
Beriev MP-1 CCCP-Н198 disappeared during a Dudinka-Volochanka flight with nine on board.
11 September 1945
Beriev MP-1 CCCP-Н230 crashed near Tankovo shortly after takeoff from Vorogovo, killing both pilots, who were drunk.
20 October 1945
Siebel Si-204D CCCP-Н372 crashed near Osoaviakhima Airfield, Krasnoyarsk during a training flight following engine failure, killing the pilot, who was drunk.
December 4, 1945
Douglas C-47 CCCP-Н362 force-landed near Tiksi due to fuel exhaustion after repeated landing attempts, causing wing and landing gear damage; all 23 on board survived. The aircraft was repaired and returned to service.
18 December 1945
Douglas C-47 CCCP-Н367 crashed on takeoff from Tiksi Airport due to crew errors; no casualties.
25 December 1945
A Douglas C-47 crashed on takeoff from Dudinka due to an in-flight fire, killing all 10 on board.
30 March 1946
Polikarpov Po-2S-2 CCCP-Н356 crashed near Kazantsevo after the cargo shifted and jammed the controls; both pilots survived.
21 November 1946
Douglas C-47 CCCP-Н424 force-landed near Yakutsk following engine failure and landing gear problems; all 19 on board survived.
13 December 1946
Focke-Wulf Fw 200C-3 CCCP-N400 force-landed on the ice off Ostrov Litne, Yamalsky District due to engine problems; all 21 on board survived, but the aircraft, operating an Igarka-Arkhangelsk passenger service, was written off.
7 February 1947
Lisunov Li-2 CCCP-Н394 struck ice hummocks and crashed at Cape Schmidt due to double engine failure following fuel starvation; no casualties.
16 March 1947
Siebel Si-204D CCCP-Н409 crashed on takeoff from Dudinka due to pilot error; although on board initially survived, the pilot was severely injured and died two days later.
17 March 1947
Polikarpov Po-2 CCCP-N391 made an emergency landing in tundra near Dudinka after the pilot became disorientated; both crew survived and burned the aircraft to keep warm.
2 April 1947
Siebel Si-204 CCCP-N408 crashed on the bank of the Indigirka River at Chokurdakh after the left propeller reversed in flight; all five on board survived.
17 April 1947
Polikarpov Po-2 CCCP-N389 nosed over and crashed on the frozen Gulf of Ob; the pilot survived. The aircraft had flown to Cape Kamenny to deliver fuel to a Po-2 (CCCP-N433), but on the way back, the engine began vibrating and losing power and an emergency landing was made on the Gulf of Ob. The aircraft took off again, but was caught by a wind gust and crashed.
6 May 1947
Siebel Si-204 CCCP-N414 force-landed wheels-up near Berezovo (40 km (25 mi) west of Tula) after both engines failed; all five on board survived.
5 June 1947
Petlyakov Pe-8 CCCP-N395 stalled and crashed at Cape Kosisty while attempting a go-around after both right engines failed due to fuel exhaustion; the six crew survived. The flight engineer made a mistake in handling the fuel system, causing both right side engines to quit.
31 August 1947
Polikarpov Po-2 CCCP-N404 crashed on takeoff in the Maimecha River due to windshear; the pilot survived.
1 December 1947
Ilyushin Il-12 CCCP-N439 force-landed in a forest near Taldom after the left engine failed due to an oil leak; all five crew survived.
21 February 1948
Lisunov Li-2 CCCP-N427 crashed on takeoff from Khatanga Airport after both engines failed due to fuel starvation; no casualties.
7 March 1948
Lisunov Li-2 CCCP-N444 disappeared while operating a Dudinka-Anderma passenger service; the aircraft was found on 17 September 1950 on the slope of Netem-Pe mountain in the Urals; all 20 on board died. The aircraft had struck the mountain while in flight due to possible crew fatigue.
13 March 1948
Polikarpov Po-2S CCCP-N383 crashed while attempting to return to Cape Kamenny following engine failure; the pilot survived.
16 March 1948
Lisunov Li-2 CCCP-N456 crashed on takeoff from Vorkuta Airport due to snow on the runway; all six crew on board survived, but the aircraft was written off. The aircraft was involved in a search for missing Li-2 CCCP-N444.
21 March 1948
Douglas C-47 CCCP-N362 crashed on takeoff from Dudinka due to engine failure and pilot error; no casualties.
28 April 1948
Polikarpov Po-2 CCCP-N433 force-landed 40 km (25 mi) from Yaptik-Sale after the pilot became disorientated; both the pilot and passenger survived. The aircraft was flying to Seyakha to deliver food to the crew of Ju 52 CCCP-N380 that had broken down.
16 September 1948
Lisunov Li-2T CCCP-N464 disappeared while on an ice reconnaissance flight with seven on board; the aircraft had ditched at sea at night and although the crew were able to escape the aircraft, they did not survive the extreme weather. An empty dinghy was found a few days later, but neither the seven crew nor the aircraft have ever been found. It was never understood why the operator and pilots would perform such mission in such conditions with an unsuitable aircraft.
1 November 1948
Lisunov Li-2 CCCP-N494 stalled and crashed on the ice 16 km (9.9 mi) east of Cape Kosisty while attempting a forced landing following engine failure and wing icing, killing all six crew. The engine failure was caused by a design flaw. Wreckage and bodies were found on 17 November.
14 November 1948
Lisunov Li-2 CCCP-N435 failed to take off and struck gasoline tanks at Cape Kosisty Airport due to wing and fuselage icing; no casualties.
19 March 1949
Ilyushin Il-12 CCCP-N441 crashed at an unknown location during a forced landing following engine failure; no casualties.

=== 1950s ===
23 April 1950
Focke-Wulf Fw 200C-4 CCCP-N500 overran the runway while landing at Yakutsk Airport in a crosswind, causing the left landing gear to collapse and damaging the left wing and both left side engines; all nine on board survived, but the aircraft was written off. The aircraft had been re-engined with ASh-62 engines, which lacked reversible propellers.
26 June 1950
KM-2 (a Land-Lease PBN Nomad powered by ASh-82 engines) CCCP-N488 crashed on landing in the Khimki Reservoir, Moscow due to crew error, killing two of six on board.
16 September 1950
Polikarpov Po-2 CCCP-N406 failed to takeoff and crashed in the Arctic due to overloading; all four on board survived.
7 November 1950
Lisunov PS-84 CCCP-N359 struck ice hummocks and crashed while attempting to take off from Polar Station SP-2.
20 August 1951
Antonov An-2 CCCP-N566 nosed down and crashed on takeoff in the Yakut ASSR after a clamp was left on an aileron; all four on board escaped, but the navigator drowned when a portion of a wing he was holding on to sank.
18 September 1951
Antonov An-2 CCCP-N565 failed to take off, nosed over and burned out near the Tukalan River, Krasnoyarsk region after it got stuck in mud; both crew survived.
22 October 1951
Lisunov Li-2 CCCP-N547 caught fire, exploded and burned out at Katanga Airport during refueling; the explosion tore off the right engine and threw the flight mechanic back, who survived.
30 April 1952
Antonov An-2 CCCP-N568 crashed, probably in the Krasnoyarsk Territory, following engine failure; there were no casualties, but due to the remoteness and inaccessibility of the crash site, the aircraft was written off.
27 September 1952
Mil Mi-1 CCCP-N1 crashed in a ravine near Ust-Tareya, Krasnoyarsk region due to pilot error; all four on board survived.
28 September 1952
Antonov An-2 CCCP-N591 stalled and crashed at Ust-Tareya while attempting a go-around, killing all six on board.
11 May 1953
Lisunov Li-2 CCCP-N461 crashed near Katanga due to engine failure caused by fuel exhaustion; there were no casualties, but due to the remoteness of the crash site, the aircraft was written off.
8 May 1954
Antonov An-2 CCCP-N140 crashed and burned near the North Pole after the pilot reversed the propeller too soon; all five on board survived.
1954
Douglas R4D-5 CCCP-N417 crashed on landing at Polar Station SP-3, Antarctica after the landing gear struck an ice ridge and landed on its belly; the fuselage was used as a sauna and eventually sank. The aircraft was originally used by the US Navy for Operation Ski Jump, carrying out landings on drifting ice; the aircraft was abandoned after the landing gear collapsed on one of these flights and was found and repaired by the Soviets in May 1954.
4 March 1955
Ilyushin Il-12 CCCP-N479 force-landed near Kepino, Arkhangelsk Region due to an engine fire; killing four of 25 on board.

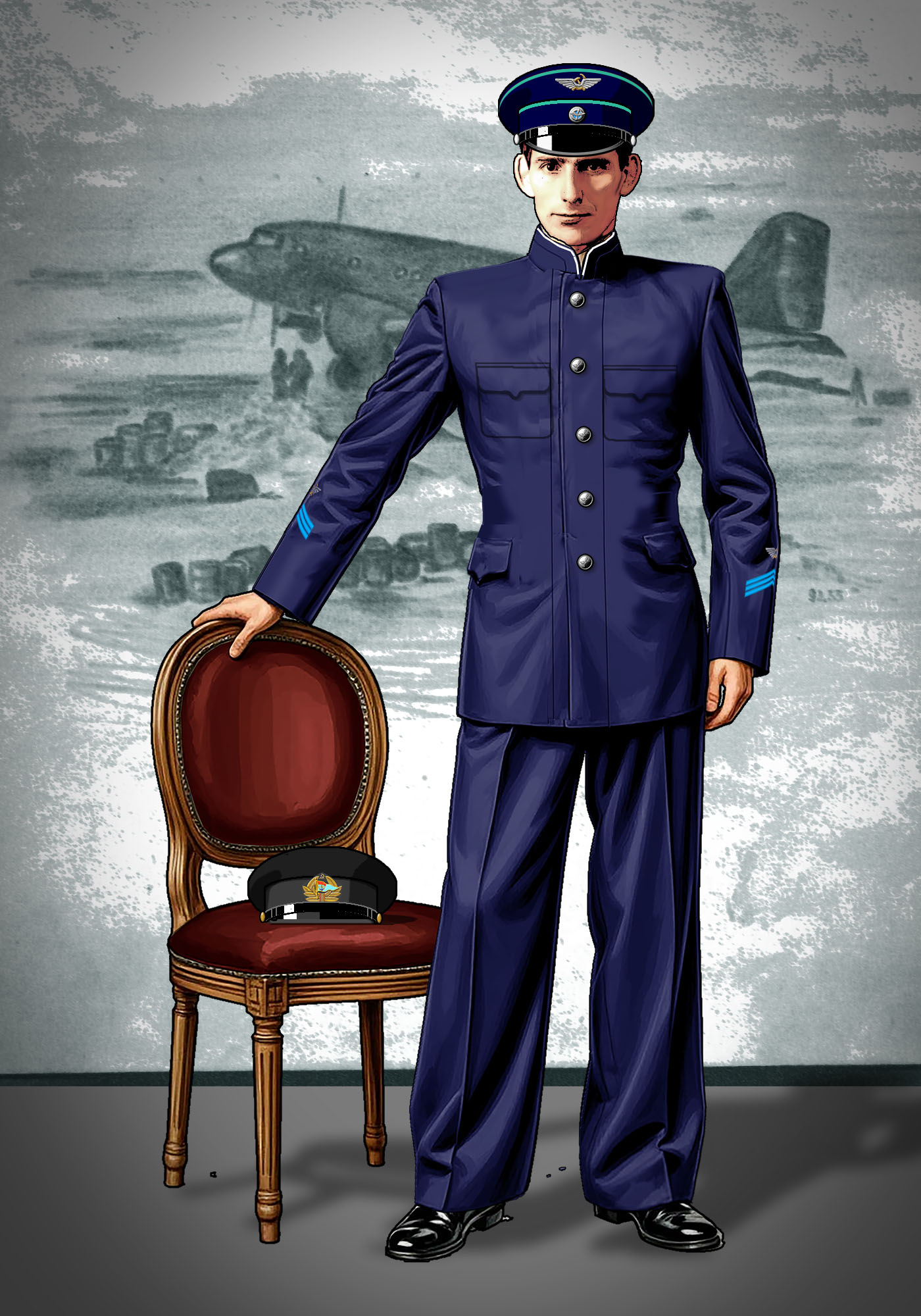
First-class aeroengine mechanic Lev Bankowski. On the chair is a British or French-style cap with a cockade, pre-1936, from the Chief Directorate of the Northern Sea Route (all sailors wore this type of cap from 1933). In the background: an Li-2 at the airfield in Norilsk. January 9, 1955. Polar aviation of the Chief Directorate of the Northern Sea Route. Moscow separate aviation detachment. Ministry of the Maritime Fleet.

2 April 1955
Lisunov Li-2 CCCP-N497 broke through the ice while landing at Mys Zhelaniya; all ten on board survived. Four days later the aircraft was swept out to sea by a storm where it sank.
26 May 1955
Lisunov Li-2 CCCP-N535 crashed on a drifting ice floe in the central Arctic Basin; all 10 passengers and crew on board survived and were evacuated; but the aircraft was set on fire and abandoned. The wreck was later spotted on 11 December 1959 by the Icelandic Coast Guard.
2 July 1955
Ilyushin Il-12 CCCP-N480 crashed on landing at Nagurskoye Air Base; the aircraft touched down on a port of the runway that had not been cleared of snow, breaking off the left landing gear and causing structural damage. There were no casualties.
11 September 1956
Lisunov Li-2 CCCP-N584 crashed near Cherepovets Airport at night during a training flight, killing the four crew.
22 September 1956
Mil Mi-4 CCCP-N42 was being ferried from Kazan to Khatanga when it broke up in mid-air and crashed near Pletnikha, Arzamas Oblast due to a design flaw, killing the four crew.
7 August 1957
Beriev Be-6K CCCP-N662 crashed 35 km from Mys Kamenny Airport after an in-flight fire caused by engine failure, killing the six crew.
February 1958
Lisunov Li-2V CCCP-N496 stalled and crashed on takeoff from Mirny Ice Station, Antarctica; the aircraft participated in the 3rd Soviet Antarctic expedition in 1958.
2 May 1958
Antonov An-2 CCCP-N588 crashed 38 mi from Igarka, killing the three crew.
30 December 1958
Ilyushin Il-14 CCCP-04196 crashed 65 km (40 mi) from Hatanga, Krasnoyarsk region, killing 16 of 17 on board.
10 August 1959
Lisunov Li-2 CCCP-04210 crashed at Chukotka Cape Shelagsky, killing seven of 10 on board.
