= Mark Shevelev =

Soviet general

- Марк Иванович Шевелёв
- Born: 24 October [O.S. 11 October] 1904; Saint Petersburg, Russian Empire
- Died: 6 October 1991 (aged 86); Moscow, USSR
- Military career
- Allegiance: Soviet Union
- Branch: Soviet Air Force
- Rank: Lieutenant-general of Aviation
- Conflicts: Russian Civil War; World War II
- Awards: Hero of the Soviet Union

Mark Ivanovich Shevelev (Russian: Марк Иванович Шевелёв; 24 October [O.S. 11 October] 1904 – 6 October 1991) was a Soviet pilot during World War II and one of founders of Soviet polar aviation. He was a head of aviation department Aviaarktika of the Chief Directorate of the Northern Sea Route, a Hero of the Soviet Union, and later reached the rank lieutenant-general.

== Early years ==
Mark Shevelev was born 24 October [O.S. 11 October] 1904 in Saint Petersburg to Jewish parents. After joining the Red Army in 1920 he participated in the Civil War, and later joined the Communist Party in 1921. He then went on to graduate from the air transportation department of Leningrad Institute of Transport in 1925.

== Polar Aviator ==
Mark Shevelev joined Soviet polar aviation in 1929. Since 1933 he headed aviation department of the Chief Directorate of the Northern Sea Route, Participated in 6 polar expeditions in 1929–1937. In 1937 he was the deputy of Otto Schmidt, in the expedition to airlift North Pole-1 personnel and equipment to the North Pole. He had been awarded the title Hero of the Soviet Union.

== During World War II ==
When Operation Barbarossa started, Mark Shevelev became deputy commander of air force division, then Chief of Staff of Soviet Long Range Aviation. Since Spring 1944 he commanded Soviet part of Northwest Staging Route.

== Post-war years ==
Deputy directory of Soviet Directorate of Civil Aviation in 1947–1952. Deputy Commander, Chief of Staff of Air Force army in 1953–1954. Chief of Directorate of Polar Civil Aviation in 1960–1971. Chaired 15 polar expeditions, including ice surveilliance for icebreaker Arktika during its expedition to the North Pole.

== Awards ==
- Two Orders of Lenin
- Order of Kutuzov, 2nd class
- Order of the Patriotic War, 1st class
- Order of the Red Banner of Labour, three times
- Order of Friendship of Peoples
- Order of the Red Star, three times
- USSR State Prize (1984)
