= Chief Directorate of the Northern Sea Route =

Soviet government organization

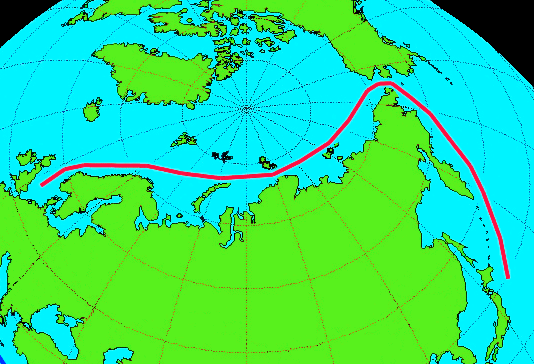
Depiction of a northern sea route between Europe and the Pacific

The Chief Directorate of the Northern Sea Route (Russian: Главное Управление Северного Морского Пути, romanized: Glavnoe upravlenie Severnogo morskogo puti), also known as Glavsevmorput or GUSMP (Russian: ГУСМП), was a Soviet government organization in charge of the maritime Northern Sea Route, established in January 1932 and dissolved in 1964.

== History ==
The organization traces its roots to AO Komseverput (Russian: Комитет Северного морского пути, romanized: Komitet Severnogo morskogo puti) or KSMP, a shipping company established by the Kolchak government in 1919 and subsequently nationalized by the Bolsheviks. In May 1931 AO Komseverput was reorganized into VO Glavkomseverput; the organization employed 35,000 men scattered all over Arctic, as well as a sizable staff in Moscow and in other mainland cities. A new office, Glavsevmorput, was established in December 1932 and absorbed VO Glavkomseverput in May 1933. Overall management was assigned to the Arctic explorer Otto Schmidt, who had previously managed the Arctic Institute (VAI, later AANII). Glavsevmorput had its own Polar Air service Aviaarktika, headed by Mark Shevelev.

Glavsevmorput, in addition to running Arctic shipping, also became the Soviet agency for exploiting resources across the far north and coordinating supplies and transport. It aimed to contribute to the development of northern coastal Siberia; the office was empowered to establish seaports, conduct extensive research, and trade with the United States and Japan as was necessary to its principal function. The organization's quick unchecked expansion, especially in its Moscow offices, was initially masked by the successes of the 1934–1936 seasons.

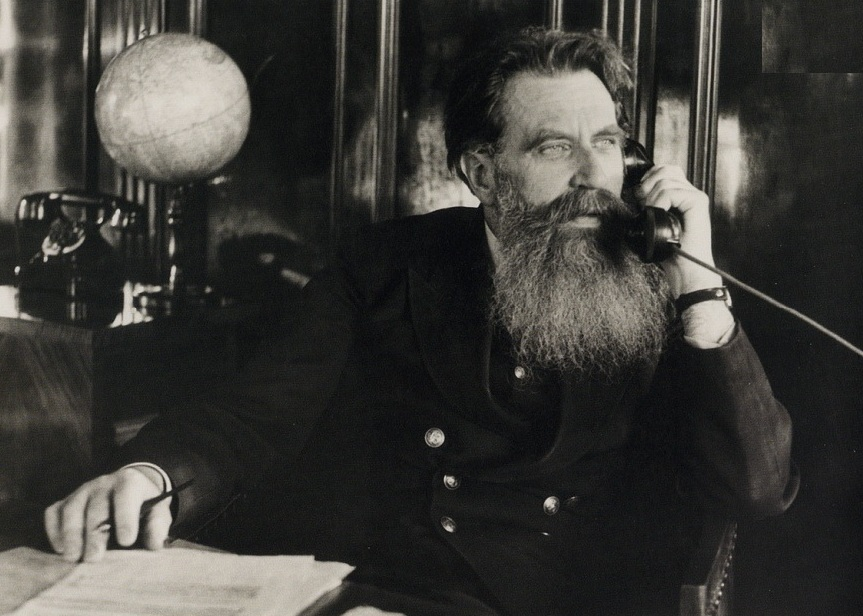
First director of the directorate, Otto Schmidt

However, the season of 1937, through a combination of unrealistic plans, bad weather and bad luck, proved a disaster. Twenty-five of 64 ships dispatched on the route (many of them not fit for Arctic conditions) were trapped with crews and cargoes in the Arctic winter; one, Rabochiy, sank. The débâcle, which coincided with the Great Purge of 1936–1938, led to a string of arrests; at least 673 Glavsevmorput personnel were arrested in a domino-effect NKVD operation. The oversized organization was streamlined and stripped of auxiliary functions that were delegated to Dalstroy (land facilities) and to the State trading company Gostorg (foreign trade). Glavsevmorput was to concentrate exclusively on maintaining the Northern Sea Route, specifically running its coastal shipping line.

Otto Schmidt, previously a high-profile public figure, was spared but demoted to scientific duties; overall management of the organization was reassigned to Ivan Papanin, a famous polar explorer. Papanin's first season, 1939, was a relatively safe and successful one; the Northern Sea Route had become a functioning regular line, rather than a dangerous experiment.

In 1953 the organization, previously enjoying the status of a national ministry, was downgraded to a department of the Merchant Fleet ministry. In 1964 the department was dissolved and its units divided amongst the Ministry of the Maritime Fleet, the Hydrometeorological Service of the USSR and the Soviet Ministry of Civil Aviation. The system continued working and reached peak capacity in 1987.

A large island at the mouth of the Kolyma River (Mikhalkino) was named Glavsevmorput (or GUSMP) Island in honour of the organization 69°30′N 161°30′E.

== Uniforms and rank insignia ==
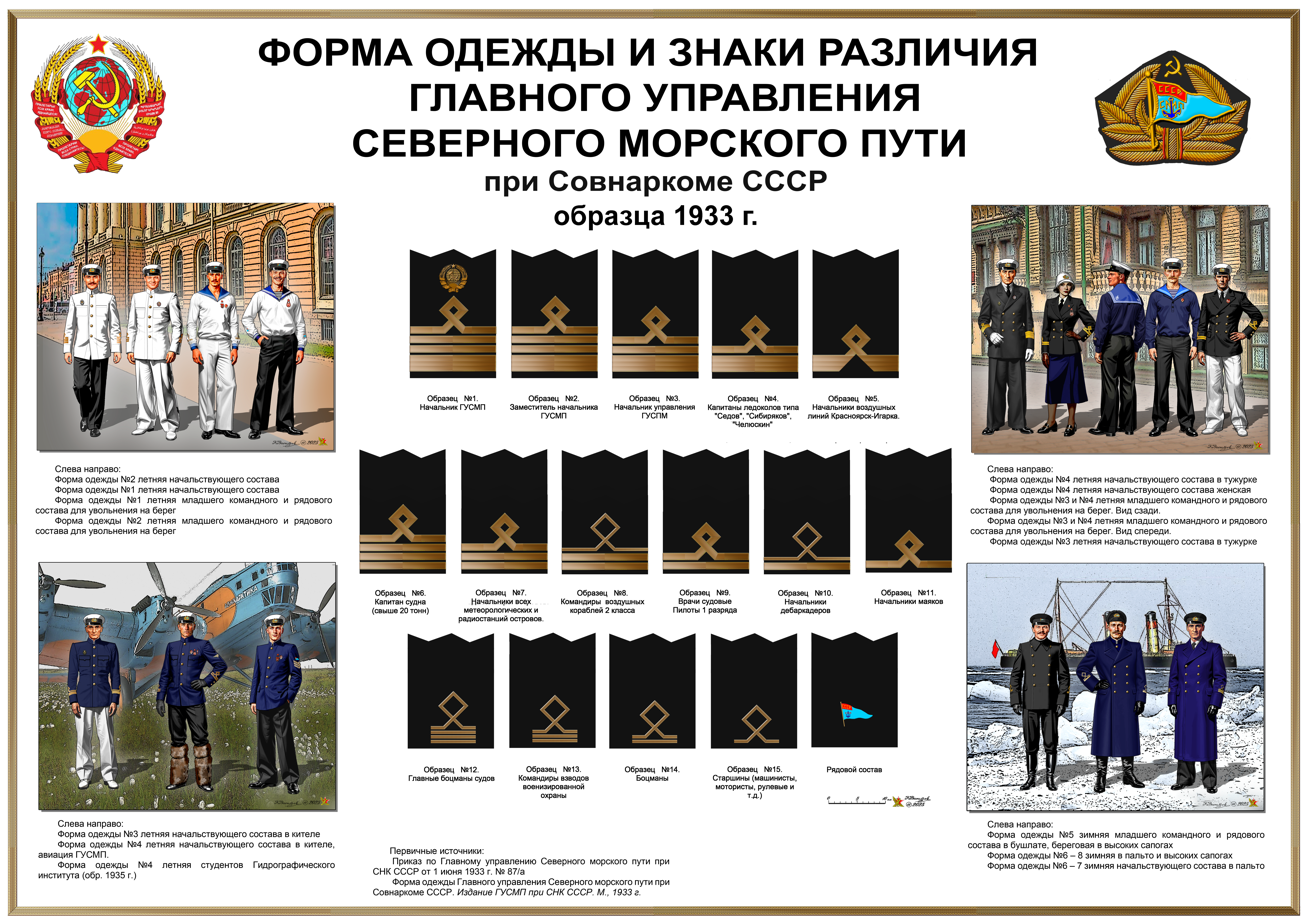
Uniforms and insignia of the Glavsevmorput, 1933-1936.

== See also ==
- Great Northern Expedition
