= Russian patrol ship Ivan Papanin =

Russian icebreaking patrol ship

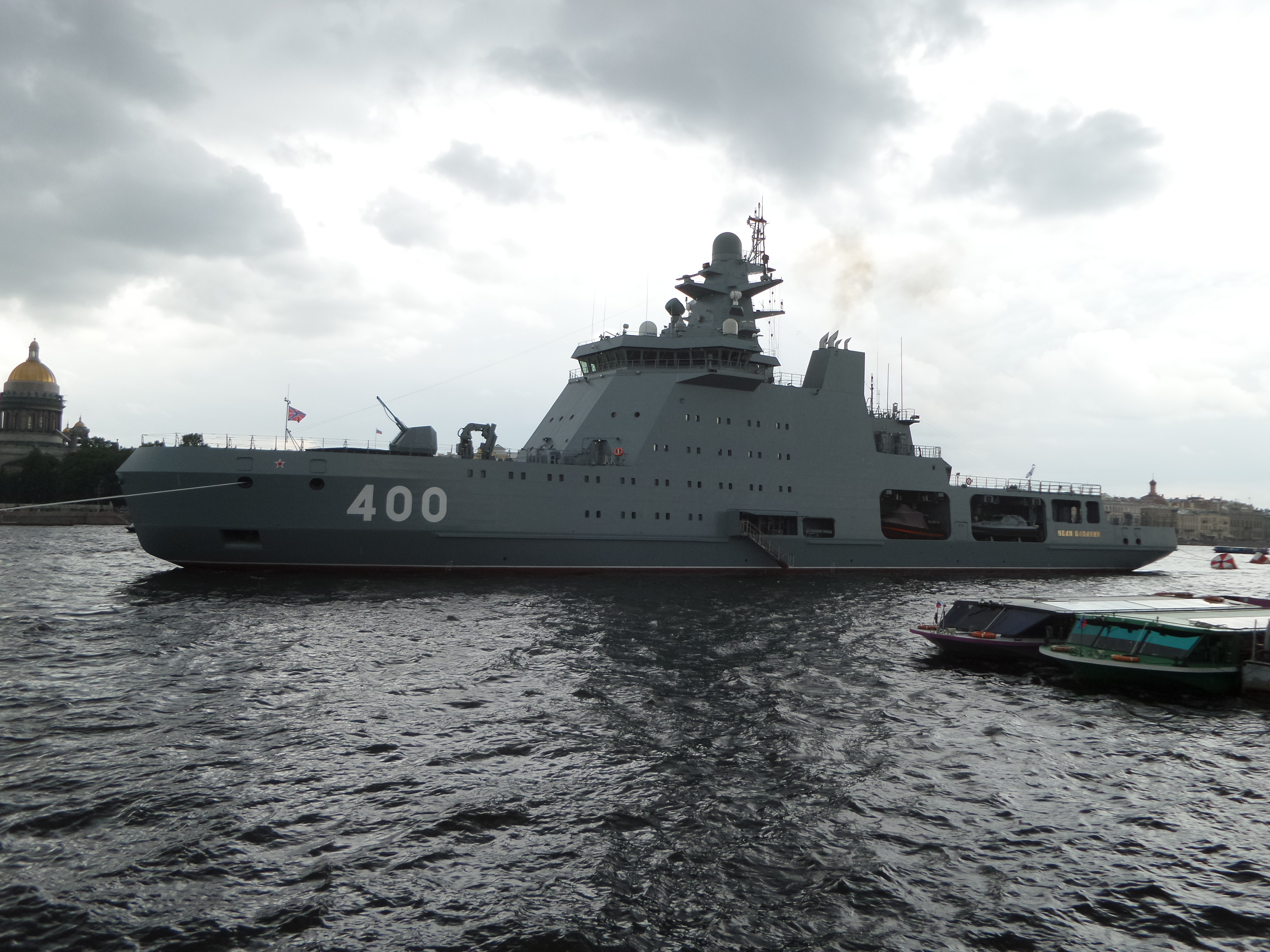
- Ivan Papanin in July 2024

History

Russia
- Name: Ivan Papanin (Russian: Иван Папанин)
- Namesake: Ivan Papanin
- Operator: (Russia) Northern Fleet
- Builder: Admiralty Shipyards (Saint Petersburg)
- Laid down: 19 April 2017
- Launched: 25 October 2019
- Commissioned: 5 September 2025
- Identification: IMO number: 9898151
- Status: In service

General characteristics
- Class & type: Project 23550 patrol ship
- Displacement: 6,800 t (6,700 long tons; 7,500 short tons) standard; 8,500 t (8,400 long tons; 9,400 short tons) full load
- Length: 114 m (374 ft 0 in)
- Beam: 18 m (59 ft 1 in)
- Draught: 6 m (19 ft 8 in)
- Ice class: RS Arc7
- Installed power: 4 × Kolomna 28-9DG diesel generators (4 × 3,500 kW)
- Propulsion: Diesel–electric propulsion; two shafts (2 × 6,300 kW); Two bow thrusters
- Speed: 18 knots (33 km/h; 21 mph)
- Range: 10,000 nmi (19,000 km; 12,000 mi) at 10 knots (19 km/h; 12 mph)
- Complement: 60 core crew + 50 extra mission crew
- Armament: 1 × 76.2 mm (3 in) AK-176MA naval gun; 2 × 12.7 mm Kord machine guns; 8 × 3M-54 Kalibr missiles (optional)
- Aviation facilities: Helipad and hangar for Ka-27 helicopter

Ivan Papanin (Russian: Иван Папанин) is a Russian icebreaking patrol ship. She is the first vessel built to the Project 23550 design. She was launched in October 2019 and went on sea trials in June 2024. The last estimate for commissioning was the summer 2025 following ice trials in Franz Josef Land. The Ivan Papanin joined the Russian Navy on September 5th, 2025.

The vessel resemble NoCGV Svalbard and Canada's Harry DeWolf class, but they are more heavily armed.

== Construction ==
The vessel was laid down at Admiralty Shipyards in 2017 and launched in 2019, though delivery to the Navy was repeatedly delayed due to import substitution issues.

== Operation history ==
The Russian Navy formally commissioned the Ivan Papanin, a Project 23550 patrol icebreaker, during a ceremony in Severomorsk, according to the Russian United Shipbuilding Corporation on September 5, 2025. The ship was reported active as of 2026, deploying with a Northern Fleet task force in Arctic waters.

== General characteristics ==
It displaces around 9,000 tons, measures 114 meters in length, and can reach speeds of up to 18 knots with a 12.6 MW propulsion system. It has an endurance of 70 days and a range of up to 10,000 nautical miles. The crew consists of 49 sailors with accommodation for an additional 47 personnel. The ship can also carry helicopters, drones, and two Raptor-class patrol boats.

Armament includes a 76.2 mm AK-176MA automatic naval gun, but the most notable feature is its ability to carry containerized missile systems. The Ivan Papanin can be equipped with up to eight Kalibr-K cruise missiles or Uran anti-ship missiles.
