= North Pole-1 =

Soviet drifting ice station in the Arctic Ocean, opened in 1937

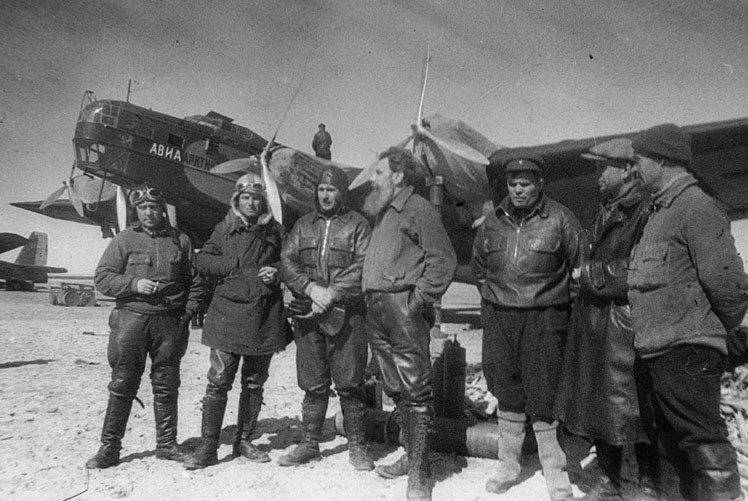
Otto Schmidt and pilots of their ANT-6-4M-34R "Aviaarktika" aircraft, a specialized model of the North Pole-1 expedition to the North Pole, from left to right: Ivan Spirin, Mark Shevelev, Mikhail Babushkin, Otto Schmidt, Mikhail Vodopyanov, Anatoly Alekseev and Vasily Molokov, 1937

North Pole-1 (Russian: Северный полюс-1) was the world's first crewed drifting ice station in the Arctic Ocean, primarily used for research.

North Pole-1 was established on 21 May 1937 and officially opened on 6 June, some 20 kilometres (12 mi) from the North Pole by the expedition into the high latitudes Sever-1, led by Otto Schmidt. The expedition had been airlifted by aviation units under the command of Mark Shevelev. "NP-1" operated for 9 months, during which the ice floe travelled 2,850 kilometres (1,770 mi). The commander of the station was Ivan Papanin. On 19 February 1938 the Soviet ice breakers Taimyr and Murman took four polar explorers off the station close to the eastern coast of Greenland. They arrived in Leningrad on 15 March on board the icebreaker Yermak.

The expedition members, hydrobiologist Pyotr Shirshov, geophysicist Yevgeny Fyodorov, radioman Ernst Krenkel, and the commander Ivan Papanin, were awarded the Hero of the Soviet Union title.
