= Yevgeny Fyodorov (scientist) =

Soviet geophysicist, statesman, and public figure (1910–1981)

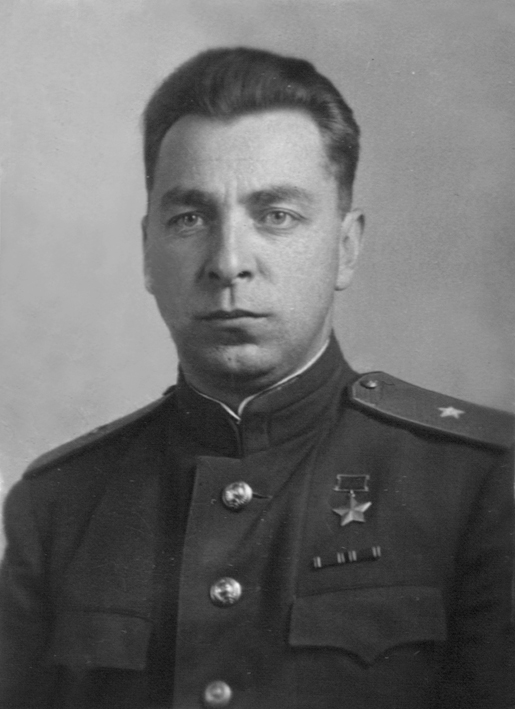
- Born: 10 April 1910; Bendery, Bessarabia Governorate, Russian Empire
- Died: 30 December 1981 (aged 71)
- Military career
- Allegiance: Soviet Union
- Awards: Hero of the Soviet Union

Signature
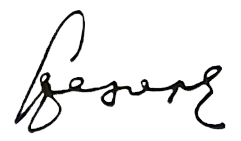

Yevgeny Konstantinovich Fyodorov (Russian: Евгений Константинович Фёдоров; 10 April [O.S. 28 March], 1910 – 30 December 1981) was a Soviet geophysicist, statesman, public figure, academician (1960), and Hero of the Soviet Union (1938).

== Biography ==
Yevgeny Fyodorov graduated from Leningrad State University in 1932. In 1932–1938, he was a research associate on several polar stations, including the first drifting ice station North Pole-1 (1937-1938). In 1938–1939, Yevgeny Fyodorov headed the Arctic and Antarctic Research Institute. In 1938 he joined the All-Union Communist Party (b).

In 1939-1947 and 1962–1974, he was in charge of the Soviet Weather Service (Гидрометеослужба СССР). In 1947–1955, Yevgeny Fyodorov was employed at the Geophysics Institute of the Soviet Academy of Sciences. He was the one to establish and then head the Applied Geophysics Institute of the Soviet Weather Service.

Yevgeny Fyodorov authored numerous works dedicated to his research on the Arctic geophysical fields, water balance of clouds, artificial influence on meteorological processes, study of highest atmospheric layers with the use of satellites, pollution etc. Yevgeny Fyodorov was awarded the USSR State Prize (1946, 1969), five Orders of Lenin, Order of the October Revolution, six other orders, and several medals.

Fyodorov was the second chairman of the Soviet Peace Committee, in the years 1979–1981.
