= Purga-class patrol ship =

Type of ship

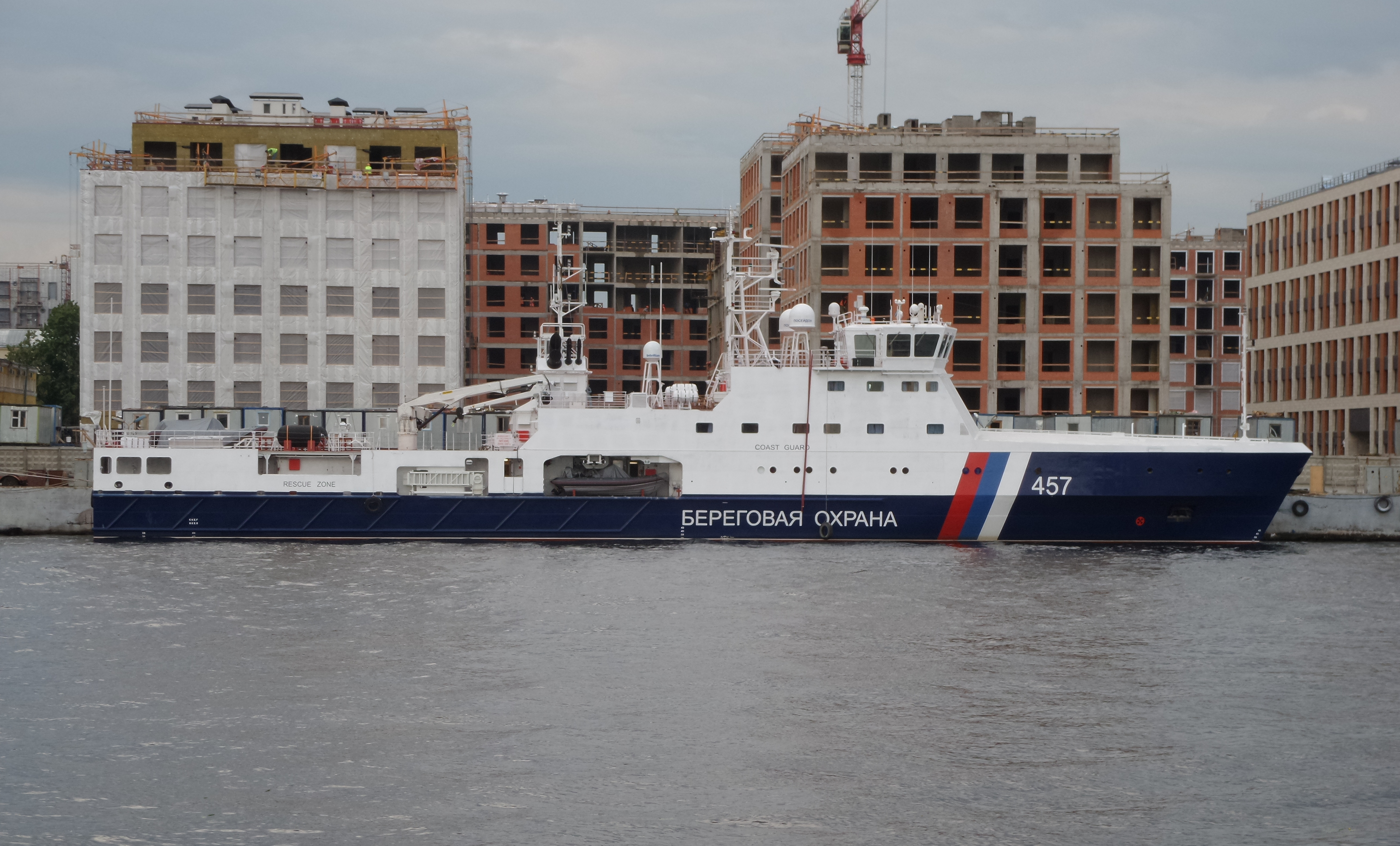
- Purga-class patrol ship PPK-831, 2022

Class overview
- Builders: Almaz shipbuilding company
- Operators: Russian Coast Guard
- Preceded by: Ivan Susanin class
- Succeeded by: Project 23550
- Built: 2007–2025
- In commission: 2010–present
- Planned: 12
- Completed: 12
- Active: 12

General characteristics
- Type: Patrol vessel
- Displacement: 1,066 tonnes (1,049 long tons; 1,175 short tons) full load
- Length: 71 m (232 ft 11 in)
- Beam: 10.4 m (34 ft 1 in)
- Draft: 3.5 m (11 ft 6 in)
- Propulsion: 2 × 5,440-metric-horsepower (5,370 hp) diesel engines ABC 16M VZDC-1000-180; 2 shafts
- Speed: 24 knots (44 km/h; 28 mph)
- Range: 6,000 nmi (11,000 km; 6,900 mi) at 14 knots (26 km/h; 16 mph)
- Complement: 25
- Sensors & processing systems: MR-231 radar
- Armament: Small arms; Provision for 1 × 30 mm AK-306M CIWS on bow (installed from Podolsk onwards)
- Aviation facilities: Helipad for Ka-226 helicopter

The Purga class, Russian designation Project 22120 Purga (Russian: Пурга, lit. 'Blizzard'), is a series of ice-strengthened patrol ships designed by Petrobalt Design Bureau and being built by Almaz for the Russian Coast Guard. Project 22120 is a new generation border patrol vessel with an icebreaking capability, allowing it independent navigation in areas with ice thickness up to 0.6 m during winter-spring and up to 0.8 m during summer-autumn season. The class is intended for operations in waters near Sakhalin, Russia's largest island.

== Ships ==
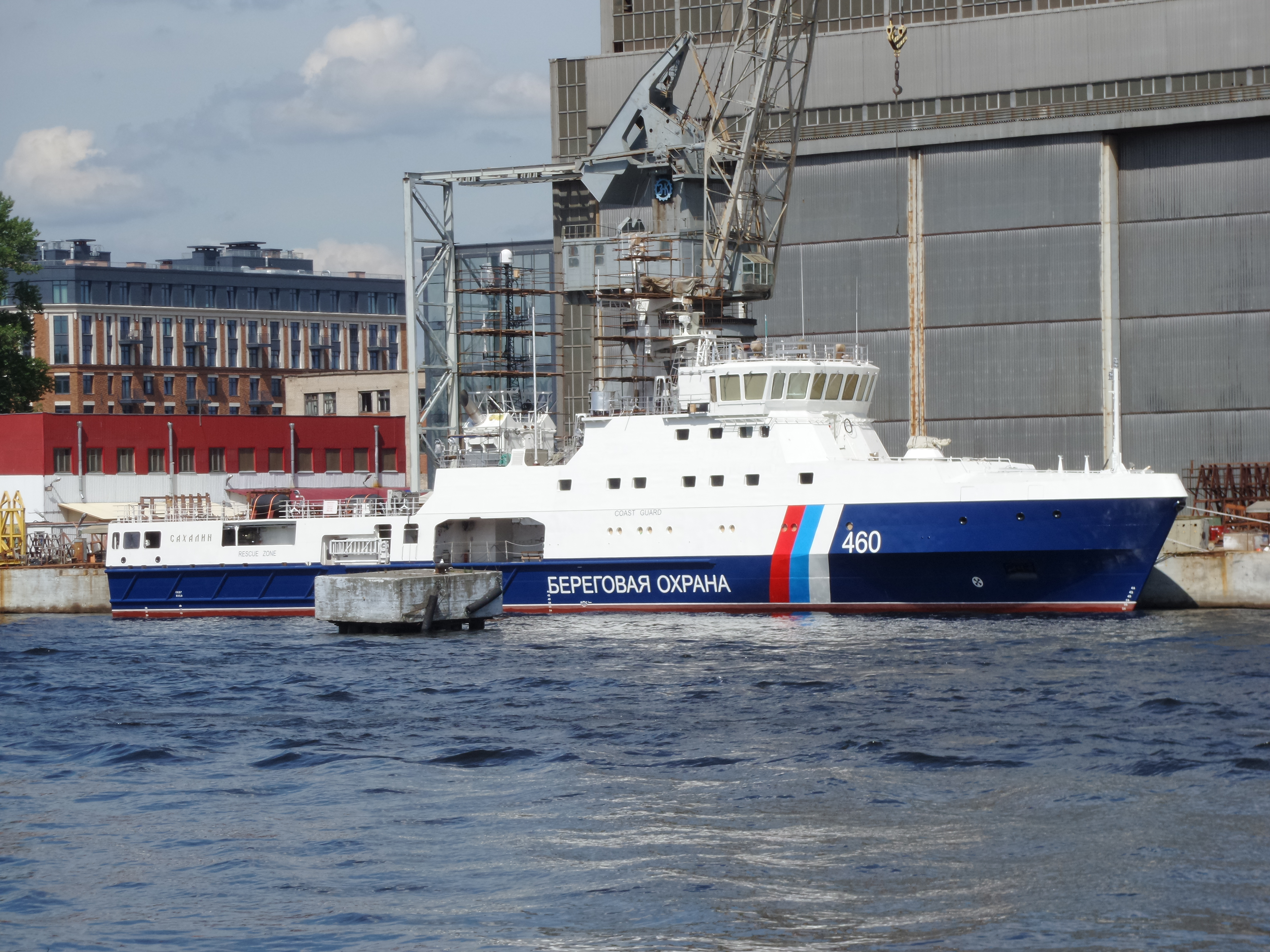
Sakhalin with a mounted bow 30 mm CIWS, 2024

Name	Builders	Laid down	Launched	Commissioned	Status	Fleet
Kontr-admiral Kolchin E.S. (ex-PPS-824, ex-PS-824, ex-PS-581)	Almaz shipbuilding company	2007	24 December 2009	22 December 2010	Active	Pacific
Kontr-admiral Dianov (ex-PPS-825, ex-PS-825)	Almaz shipbuilding company	25 November 2011	5 December 2012	6 July 2013	Active	Pacific
Kamchatka	Almaz shipbuilding company	24 May 2017	17 May 2018	23 November 2018	Active	Pacific
Zabaykalye	Almaz shipbuilding company	30 May 2018	end-April 2019	July 2019	Active	Pacific
Taymyr	Almaz shipbuilding company	30 May 2018	July 2019	10 July 2020	Active	Pacific
Admiral Ugryumov	Almaz shipbuilding company	22 November 2019	15 April 2021	16 August 2021	Active	Pacific
Ladoga	Almaz shipbuilding company	2020	10 June 2020	29 September 2021	Active	Northern
Primorye (ex-PPK-831)	Almaz shipbuilding company	2021	26 April 2022	30 September 2022	Active	Pacific
Podolsk	Almaz shipbuilding company	2022	20 May 2023	11 November 2023	Active	Pacific
Ufa	Almaz shipbuilding company	2022	15 June 2023	29 December 2023	Active	Pacific
Sakhalin	Almaz shipbuilding company	2023	28 May 2024	18 December 2024	Active	Pacific
Kholmsk	Almaz shipbuilding company	2023	10 June 2025	9 December 2025	Active	Pacific

== See also ==
- List of ships of the Soviet Navy
- List of ships of Russia by project number
