= Nikolay Nikolaevich Zubov =

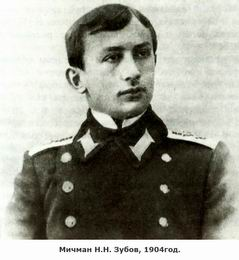
- Born: 11 May 1885; Lipcani, Bessarabia, Russian Empire
- Died: 11 November 1960 (aged 75); Moscow, Soviet Union
- Military career
- Allegiance: Russian Empire
- Awards: Order of Saint Anna; Order of Saint Stanislaus

Nikolay Nikolaevich Zubov (Russian: Николай Николаевич Зубов; 11 May 1885 - 11 November 1960) was a Russian naval officer, engineer, geographer, oceanographer and polar explorer. In 1901, Zubov joined the Sea Cadet Corps and in 1904, participated in the Russo-Japanese War. He was severely wounded in the Battle of Tsushima. In 1910, he obtained a degree in hydrography from the Navy Academy and took part in a 1912 expedition to Novaya Zemlya. He carried out many more expeditions into the arctic and in 1945 he was awarded the title of Engineer Rear admiral.

== Selected publications ==
- Морские воды и льды (Sea Waters and Ice), 1938
