= Ernst Krenkel =

Soviet arctic explorer, government official, and journalist

- Born: Ernst Teodorovich Krenkel; 24 December [O.S. 11 December] 1903; Belostok, Russian Empire
- Died: 8 December 1971 (aged 67); Moscow, Russian SFSR, Soviet Union
- Occupation(s): Geographer, explorer
- Awards: Hero of the Soviet Union

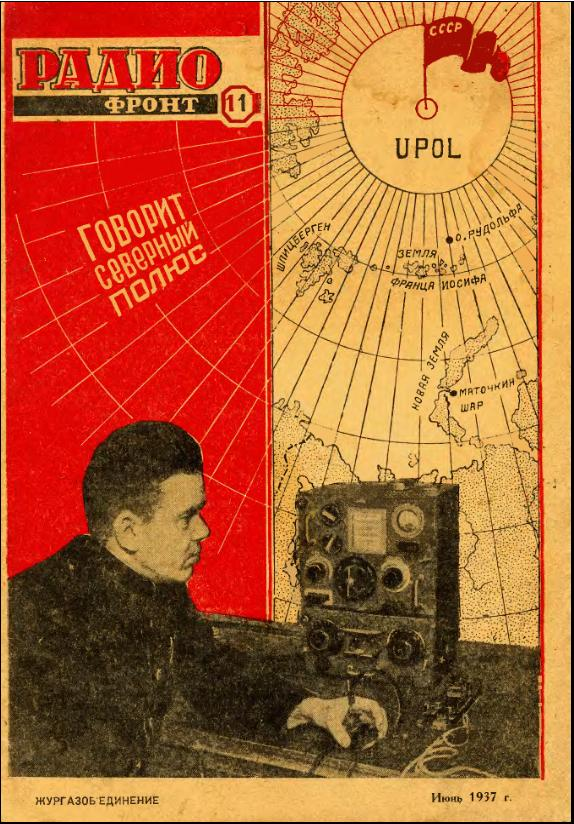
E. Krenkel as Polar radio operator on the cover of Radiofront magazine. 1937

Ernst Teodorovich Krenkel (Russian: Эрнст Теодо́рович Кре́нкель; 24 December [O.S. 11 December] 1903 in Białystok – 8 December 1971 in Moscow) was a Soviet Arctic explorer, radio operator, and doctor of geographical sciences (1938). He is best known as one of the four members of the North Pole-1 expedition, for which he was awarded the title of Hero of the Soviet Union in 1938. Amateur radio callsigns: EU2EQ, U3AA, UA3AA, RAEM.

== Publications ==
- Ernst Krenkel. (1937). Four Russians at North Pole Get Together Once a Day. The Science News-Letter, 32(865), 300–300.
- Ernst Krenkel. (1937). Ice Floe of Polar Scientists No Longer Is Northernmost. The Science News-Letter, 32(872), 407–408.
- Ernst Krenkel. (1978). RAEM is my call-sign. — Moscow: Progress Publishers. (English edition of memoirs.)

== Bibliography ==
- Ananyev, A. (2021). Heroes of the Ice: The Polar Explorer and the Ice Hockey Player as Two Masculine Identity Scripts of the Soviet Era. In J. Herzberg, A. Renner, & I. Schierle (Eds.), The Russian Cold: Histories of Ice, Frost, and Snow (1st ed., Vol. 22, pp. 226–248). Berghahn Books.
- McCannon, J. (1995). To storm the Arctic: Soviet polar exploration and public visions of nature in the USSR, 1932-1939. Ecumene, 2(1), 15–31.
- McCannon, J. (1997). Positive Heroes at the Pole: Celebrity Status, Socialist-Realist Ideals and the Soviet Myth of the Arctic, 1932-39. The Russian Review, 56(3), 346–365.
