= Vladimir Yetylin =

Russian politician

- Владимир Етылин
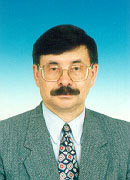
- Official portrait, 2001

Member of the State Duma from Chukotka constituency of Chukotka AO
- In office 1 July 2001 – 29 December 2003
- Preceded by: Roman Abramovich
- Succeeded by: Irina Panchenko

Chairman of the Chukotka Okrug Soviet of People's Deputies
- In office March 1990 – 9 October 1993

People's Deputy of the Soviet Union
- In office 25 May 1989 – 8 December 1991

Personal details
- Born: 15 October 1944 (age 81) Omolon, Bilibinsky District, Chukotka National Okrug, Kamchatka Oblast, Khabarovsk Krai, Russian SFSR, Soviet Union
- Party: Independent
- Other political affiliations: CPRF (2011); NPRF (2001–2007); CPSS (until 1991)
- Children: 1
- Education: Primorsky Agrarian Institute; Khabarovsk Higher Party School; Academy of Social Studies of the Central Committee of CPSS (1989)

Vladimir Mikhailovich Yetylin (Russian: Владимир Михайлович Етылин; sometimes referred as Vladimir Yetylen; born 15 October 1944) is a Soviet and Russian politician and former Member of the State Duma from Chukotka Autonomous Okrug (2001–2003).

== Biography ==
Vladimir Yetylin, an ethnic Chukchi, was born on 15 October 1944 in Chukotka village Omolon. His father was a hereditary deer herder.

Yetylin graduated Primorsky Agricultural Institute in Ussuriysk as an economist and, later, Khabarovsk Higher Party School.

In 1983-1984 Yetylin was Second Secretary of the Chukotka Okrug CPSS Committee. In 1989 Yetylin received an aspirant degree from the Academy of Social Studies of the Central Committee of CPSS and started working in research centre "Chukotka" at the Far Eastern Branch of the Russian Academy of Sciences as head of the laboratory of traditional environmental management and ethno-social relations.

In 1989 Vladimir Yetylin was elected people's deputy of the Soviet Union from Chukotka national-territorial constituency No.748. Yetylin was also elected to the Supreme Soviet of the Soviet Union and was a member of the Supreme Soviet Committee on Foreign Affairs. Vladimir Yetylin continued to be people's deputy and member of the Supreme Soviet until both bodies were disestablished in December 1991, prior to the Soviet Union dissolution.

In March 1990 Yetylin also received the position of Chairman of the Chukotka Okrug Soviet of People's Deputies, the main legislative body of the okrug. Yetylin held the chairmanship until the dissolution of all Soviets in Russia by Yeltsin's decree in October 1993. Yetylin returned to his previous job in research centre "Chukotka".

Vladimir Yetylin ran for State Duma in 1995 in the Chukotka constituency as an independent. He won only 3.71% of the vote and placed 5th, losing to incumbent deputy Tatyana Nesterenko (Independent, 42.17%).

In 1996 Vladimir Yetylin challenged incumbent Governor of Chukotka AO Aleksandr Nazarov, who was supported by the pro-Yeltsin All-Russian Coordination Council (OKS). In the December election Nazarov was re-elected with 65.18% of the vote, while Yetylin placed 2nd with 21.04%.

Yetylin again ran for State Duma in 1998 by-election, scoring the support of People’s Patriotic Union of Russia. Yetylin won 20.08% of the vote and placed 2nd, losing to Chief of the Government of Russia Staff Vladimir Babichev (Independent, 57.88%).

In 1999 Vladimir Yetylin for the third time tried to run for State Duma. Incumbent deputy for the Chukotka constituency Vladimir Babichev decided to retire which created an open seat contest. In the general election Yetylin again placed 2nd, winning 20.01%, and lost to billionaire Roman Abramovich (Independent, 59.78%).

Vladimir Yetylin for the second time ran for Governor of Chukotka AO in 2001. However, this time incumbent Governor Aleksandr Nazarov faced a strong challenge from State Duma member Roman Abramovich. In September 2000, 3 months before the election, a controversy surfaced surrounding the disappearance of nearly $35 million from the Economy of Chukotka Fund, led by Nazarov's aide Oleg Savchenko. The money were intended for the development of Okrug's economy but allegedly were spent for personal needs by Savchenko and his deputy Aleksandr Moskalenko. Simultaneously, Governor Nazarov was questioned by Federal Tax Police for his role in several tax crimes, including unpaid debts for "golden credits" and "Northern delivery" fraud. On 16 December, 8 days before the election, Aleksandr Nazarov withdrew from the race, which ensured Abramovich's win. Abramovich won the election with 90.68% of the vote, Vladimir Yetylin came in 2nd with just 3%. After the election Roman Abramovich made peace with his former opponents: he appointed former Governor Nazarov to the Federation Council and named Vladimir Yetylin his advisor for indigenous people of the North problems.

As Roman Abramovich was elected Governor, a by-election for his former seat in the State Duma was scheduled for July 2001. Vladimir Yetylin ran in the by-election but faced a serious opponent in Chief Federal Inspector for Chukotka Boris Vetoshev. Yetylin had the support of Governor Abramovich, while Vetoshev's campaign was backed by Unity political party. Yetylin narrowly won the election with 25.88%, while Vetoshev scored 22.11%.

In the State Duma Yetylin joined "People's Deputy" deputy group and was appointed to the Committee on Arctic and Far East Problems. In 2001 People's Deputy leader Gennady Raikov transformed the faction in a political party, which Yetylin also joined.

In 2003 Yetylin ran for re-election as a NPRF candidate in both the Chukotka constituency and in party list (No.1 in Far Eastern territorial group). In the constituency Yetylin faced opposition from the Abramovich Administration, which supported Deputy Governor Irina Panchenko (Independent). Even before the start of the campaign Yetylin encountered difficulties when local radio station declined to publish his message to voters. On 3 December 2003 Vladimir Yetylin withdrew from race in the constituency but remained in NPRF party list. In the general election NPRF received only 1.17% nationally (2.31% in Chukotka) and failed to pass a threshold, which resulted in Yetylin losing his seat.

After leaving State Duma Yetylin founded regional organisation "Rebirth of Chukotka" and became vice president for traditional sectors' issues of the Russian Association of the Indigenous People of the North, Siberia and the Far East.

In 2011 returned to politics and ran for the Duma of Chukotka Autonomous Okrug and for State Duma from CPRF. In the federal election Yetylin was No.4 in Chukotka territorial group, while in the regional election he was No.3 in the okrug-wide party list. Yetylin also ran in the constituency №2 against former Governor Roman Abramovich. Yetylin lost the election both in the constituency and by the party list.
