= Irina Panchenko =

Russian politician

- Ирина Панченко
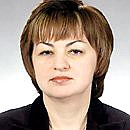

Member of the State Duma from Chukotka constituency of Chukotka AO
- In office 29 December 2003 – 24 December 2007
- Preceded by: Vladimir Yetylin
- Succeeded by: constituency eliminated Valentina Rudchenko (since 2016)

Personal details
- Born: 11 June 1968 (age 58) Moscow, Russian SFSR, Soviet Union
- Party: Independent
- Education: Plekhanov Moscow Institute of the National Economy

Irina Aleksandrovna Panchenko (Russian: Ирина Александровна Панченко) (born 11 June 1968) is a Russian politician and former Member of the State Duma from Chukotka Autonomous Okrug (2003–2007). She is also regarded as one of Roman Abramovich's close associates.

== Early life and career ==
Irina Panchenko was born on 11 June 1968 in Moscow.

Panchenko started working at the age of 17 as an accountant at the Ministry of Education of RSFSR. In 1990 Panchenko graduated Plekhanov Moscow Institute of National Economy.

In 1994–1995 Irina Panchenko worked in Moscow office of Glencore International A.G. as chief accountant. In 1995 Panchenko moved to Inpredkadry where she held the same position.

In 1997 Panchenko started working in Sibneft, an oil producer owned by Roman Abramovich. In Sibneft Panchenko started working as head of the department but later that year received the position as chief accountant. In July 1999 Irina Panchenko was promoted to Sibneft vice president for finance and was appointed to the council of directors. Panchenko moved to another Abramovich-owned company — Russian Aluminium, where she became first deputy general director – financial director.

== Political career ==
In December 2000 Roman Abramovich was elected Governor of Chukotka Autonomous Okrug with over 90% of the vote. In March 2001 Irina Panchenko was appointed by Abramovich as Deputy Governor – Deputy Chairman of the Chukotka Government for Finance, Economy and Property. In that position she played key part in development of regional economic strategy and oversaw all regional finances.

Irina Panchenko decided to run for the State Duma in 2003 as an independent. She became the first registered candidate in the Chukotka constituency. Incumbent State Duma member Vladimir Yetylin (NPRF) faced opposition from regional authorities and withdrew from the race on 3 December 2003, leaving Panchenko with just two opponents — GTRK "Chukotka" staff member Aleksandr Rudoy (Independent) and health worker Eduard Petrenko (Independent). In the general election Irina Panchenko easily won with 79.17% of the vote.

In the State Duma Irina Panchenko joined United Russia faction and was appointed to the Committee on Budget and Taxes. During her tenure in the State Duma Panchenko co-sponsored just two bills, of which only a single one was passed. The bill in question was a minor amendment to the Federal Tax Code, which added phrase "on the territory of the Russian Federation" to three separate paragraphs.

Panchenko declined to seek a second term in the State Duma and retired in December 2007. After Roman Abramovich left his position as Speaker of the Duma of Chukotka Autonomous Okrug in July 2013, Irina Panchenko completely retired from politics.

After leaving State Duma Irina Panchenko gained control over Sibneft-owned "Prodo" and LLP "Greenhouse" food companies (besides Panchenko, the companies are co-owned by former Chukotka Senator Efim Malkin, another Abramovich associate). In 2018 Panchenko and Malkin bought 25% in "Poronay" company, a key asset in large Sakhalin fishing conglomerate "Gidrostroy", owned by former Senator Aleksandr Verkhovsky.

In 2021 Forbes Woman Russia included Panchenko into its list of richest self-made Russian women. She placed 13th with an estimated wealth of $125 million.
