= Chukotka constituency =

Russian legislative constituency

Chukotka single-member constituency
- Constituency of the Russian State Duma

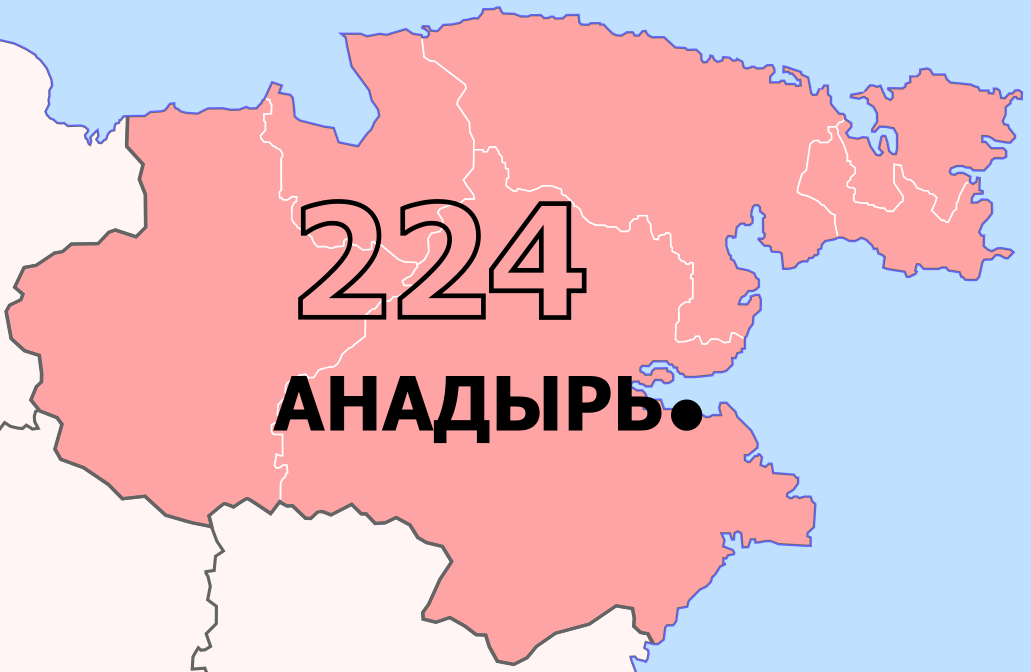
- Deputy: Aleksandr Dudorov; United Russia
- Federal subject: Chukotka Autonomous Okrug
- Districts: Anadyr, Anadyrsky, Bilibinsky, Chaunsky, Chukotsky, Iultinsky, Providensky
- Voters: 30,747 (2026)

The Chukotka constituency (No.224 (Note: No.223 in 1993-2007)) is a Russian legislative constituency in the Chukotka Autonomous Okrug. The constituency encompasses the entire territory of Chukotka. It is also the smallest single-member constituency of the State Duma by the number of registered voters.

The constituency has been represented since 2026 by United Russia deputy Aleksandr Dudorov, former Deputy Governor of Nenets Autonomous Okrug and Golitsyno mayor, who won the open seat after one-term United Russia incumbent Yelena Yevtyukhova ran for Duma of Chukotka Autonomous Okrug.

== Boundaries ==
1993–2007: Anadyr, Anadyrsky District, Beringovsky District, (Note: Merged into Anadyrsky District in 2011) Bilibinsky District, Chaunsky District, Chukotsky District, Iultinsky District, Providensky District, Shmidtovsky District (Note: Merged into Iultinsky District in 2011)

2016–present: Anadyr, Anadyrsky District, Bilibinsky District, Chaunsky District, Chukotsky District, Iultinsky District, Providensky District
The constituency has been covering the entirety of the Chukotka Autonomous Okrug since its initial creation in 1993.

== Members elected ==
Election	Member	Party
1993	Tatyana Nesterenko (Note: in 1998 was appointed Deputy Minister of Finance)	Independent
1995	Tatyana Nesterenko	Independent
1998	Vladimir Babichev	Independent
1999	Roman Abramovich (Note: in 2000 was elected Governor of Chukotka Autonomous Okrug)	Independent
2001	Vladimir Yetylin	Independent
2003	Irina Panchenko	Independent
2007	Proportional representation - no election by constituency	
2011	Proportional representation - no election by constituency	
2016	Valentina Rudchenko	United Russia
2021	Yelena Yevtyukhova	United Russia
2026	Aleksandr Dudorov	United Russia

== Election results ==
=== 1993 ===
Summary of the 12 December 1993 Russian legislative election in the Chukotka constituency
Candidate	Party	Votes	%
Tatyana Nesterenko	Independent	10,812	25.50%
Yekaterina Nutanaun	Independent	6,304	14.87%
Larisa Abryutina	Independent	5,566	13.13%
Aleksandr Omrypkir	Independent	5,007	11.81%
Vladimir Gorbunov	Independent	1,906	4.49%
against all		10,129	23.89%
Total		42,404	100%

=== 1995 ===
Summary of the 17 December 1995 Russian legislative election in the Chukotka constituency
Candidate	Party	Votes	%
Tatyana Nesterenko (incumbent)	Independent	17,005	42.17%
Maya Ettyryntyna	Communist Party	9,204	22.83%
Viktor Filatov	Liberal Democratic Party	2,860	7.09%
Larisa Abryutina	Common Cause	1,638	4.06%
Vladimir Yetylin	Independent	1,495	3.71%
Dmitry Ledovskoy	Independent	1,201	2.98%
Igor Riga	Democratic Choice of Russia – United Democrats	986	2.45%
Ilsur Idiatov	Independent	721	1.79%
Vladimir Voblikov	Faith, Work, Conscience	428	1.07%
Aleksandr Volkov	Independent	417	1.03%
against all		3,989	9.89%
Total		40,323	100%

=== 1998 ===
Summary of the 31 May 1998 Russian by-election in the Chukotka constituency
Candidate	Party	Votes	%
Vladimir Babichev	Independent	14,405	57.88%
Vladimir Yetylin	Independent	4,997	20.08%
Igor Riga	Independent	790	3.17%
Aleksandr Vasin	Independent	423	1.70%
against all		2,997	12.04%
Total		24,888	100%

=== 1999 ===
Summary of the 19 December 1999 Russian legislative election in the Chukotka constituency
Candidate	Party	Votes	%
Roman Abramovich	Independent	18,138	59.78%
Vladimir Yetylin	Independent	6,071	20.01%
Aleksandr Kiselyov	Independent	1,590	5.24%
against all		3,983	13.13%
Total		30,339	100%

=== 2001 ===
Summary of the 1 July 2001 Russian by-election in the Chukotka constituency
Candidate	Party	Votes	%
Vladimir Yetylin	Independent	4,534	25.88%
Boris Vetoshev	Independent	3,873	22.11%
Larisa Abryutina	Independent	3,169	18.09%
Nikolay Zheleznov	Independent	952	5.43%
Vladimir Dmitrik	Independent	596	3.40%
Aleksandr Melnikov	Independent	433	2.47%
against all		3,557	20.30%
Total		17,519	100%

=== 2003 ===
Summary of the 7 December 2003 Russian legislative election in the Chukotka constituency
Candidate	Party	Votes	%
Irina Panchenko	Independent	19,222	79.17%
Aleksandr Rudoy	Independent	1,188	4.89%
Eduard Petrenko	Independent	915	3.77%
against all		2,133	8.79%
Total		24,280	100%

=== 2016 ===
Summary of the 18 September 2016 Russian legislative election in the Chukotka constituency
Candidate	Party	Votes	%
Valentina Rudchenko	United Russia	10,435	56.54%
Yulia Butakova	Liberal Democratic Party	3,214	17.42%
Vladimir Galtsov	Communist Party	1,631	8.84%
Yelena Polovodova	A Just Russia	1,126	6.10%
Viktor Kolpakov	Communists of Russia	820	4.44%
Total		17,226	100%

=== 2021 ===
Summary of the 17-19 September 2021 Russian legislative election in the Chukotka constituency
Candidate	Party	Votes	%
Yelena Yevtyukhova	United Russia	6,156	36.95%
Yulia Butakova	Liberal Democratic Party	3,310	19.87%
Vladimir Galtsov	Communist Party	2,550	15.31%
Maria Yefimova	Party of Pensioners	1,593	9.56%
Aleksandr Semerikov	A Just Russia — For Truth	1,585	9.51%
Total		16,659	100%

=== 2026 ===
Summary of the 18-20 September 2026 Russian legislative election in the Chukotka constituency
Candidate	Party	Votes	%
Aleksandr Dudorov	United Russia	9,279	56.66%
Vladimir Galtsov	Communist Party	2,166	13.23%
Dmitry Novikov	Liberal Democratic Party	1,518	9.27%
Svetlana Pustilnik	New People	1,366	8.34%
Dmitry Tkachev	A Just Russia	1,163	7.10%
Total		16,376	100%
