= Maya Ettyryntyna =

Russian politician (1940–2002)

- Майя Эттырынтына
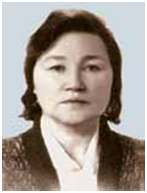

Member of the Federation Council from Chukotka AO
- In office 11 January 1994 – 23 January 1996
- Preceded by: Office established
- Succeeded by: Aleksandr Nazarov (executive authority); Sergey Povodyr (legislative authority)

People's Deputy of the Russian Federation
- In office 18 March 1990 – 4 October 1993

Personal details
- Born: 21 December 1940 Toygunen, Chukotsky District, Chukotka National Okrug, Kamchatka Oblast, Khabarovsk Krai, Russian SFSR, Soviet Union
- Died: 19 January 2002 (aged 61)
- Party: Independent
- Other political affiliations: CPRF; CPSS (until 1991)
- Education: Khabarovsk State Medical Institute (1964)

Maya Ivanovna Ettyryntyna (Russian: Майя Ивановна Эттырынтына; 21 December 1940 – 19 January 2002) was a Soviet and Russian politician and former Member of the Federation Council from Chukotka Autonomous Okrug (1994–1996).

== Early life and career ==
Maya Ettyryntyna, an ethnic Chukchi, was born on 21 December 1940 in Toygunen reindeer encampment (in the 1950s it was merged with other small encampments into Neshkan village) in the far northern corner of Chukotka.

In 1964 Ettyryntyna graduated Khabarovsk State Medical Institute and later worked as a primary-care physician in Anadyr and Khabarovsk. In 1974 she was promoted to chief doctor of the Chukotsky District, in 1980-1985 Ettyryntyna was chief of medical statistics at the Chukotka Central Okrug Hospital, and in 1985 she became chief doctor at the Chukotka Okrug Tuberculosis Dispensary.

== People's Deputy ==
Maya Ettyryntyna was active in local politics, being elected to the District and Okrug Soviets of People's Deputies.

On 18 March 1990 Ettyryntyna was elected people's deputy of Russia from Chukotka national-territorial constituency No.166. She was also elected to the Supreme Soviet of Russia, where in September 1991 she was appointed to the Soviet of Nationalities Commission on Social and Economic Development of National Autonomies and Small Indigenous Peoples. Ettyryntyna also was member of the Communists of Russia faction.

As a people's deputy, Maya Ettyryntyna was major proponent of expanding Chukotka Okrug's autonomy, implementation of regional khozraschyot, and economic and administrative independence of the Chukotka Okrug Soviet of People's Deputies. Former Soviet of Nationalities Chairman Ramazan Abdulatipov in his memoir noted Ettyryntyna's help in securing Northern delivery service.

Maya Ettyryntyna was consequential opponent of Boris Yeltsin and his reforms. Pro-Democratic Information Analysis Unit in its bulletin gave Ettyryntyna scores of -74 during I-IV Congresses of People's Deputies and -100 during VI Congress, which refers to "radical communist" in their classification (among major reformist pieces of legislation Ettyryntyna supported depoliticisation of the Army and professionalisation of deputy's status). In February 1992 Ettyryntyna was among 43 people's deputies, who signed a motion to the Constitutional Court of Russia to review the legality of President Yeltsin's decrees that outlawed CPSS and CP RSFSR. Ettyryntyna later joined 22 other deputies in signing the appeal to the prosecutor's office to investigate actions of security officers, who allegedly used physical force to escort people's deputy Yury Slobodkin from the audience during the 5 June 1993 Constitutional Consultation.

During the 1993 constitutional crisis Maya Ettyryntyna stayed at the besieged Supreme Soviet, where she and Lyudmila Bakhtiyarova were responsible for food rationing. Ettyryntyna and fellow female people's deputies Svetlana Goryacheva, Zoya Oykina, Nina Solodyakova, Zoya Kornilova and Nina Medvedeva on 24 September pleaded to the Dzerzhinsky Division soldiers to lift the blockade, to no avail. However, during the subsequent unrest Ettyryntyna received a rib injury. For her position during the constitutional crisis Ettyryntyna was stripped of social guarantees established for people's deputies by President Yeltsin.

== Federation Council ==
After the dissolution of the Supreme Soviet on 4 October 1993 Maya Ettyryntyna was appointed Chair of the Regional Commission on the Bering Strait, which fostered joint cooperation between Russia and the United States in the region.

In December 1993 Maya Ettyryntyna ran for newly created Federation Council in the Chukotka two-member constituency as an independent. Ettyryntyna placed first in the election with 27.29% of the vote, second mandate was won by Lyudmila Kotesova, Chief of Regional Justice Department (Choice of Russia, 25.09%).

In the Federation Council Ettyryntyna was appointed Secretary of the Committee on Commonwealth of Independent States Affairs and Secretary of the Counting Commission. She also joined "Constructive Cooperation" deputies' group, which united nearly all radical opposition and several centrists members. Ettyryntyna also joined the Russian delegation of Inter-republic faction "Economic Union", composed of members of Federal Assembly of Russia, Verkhovna Rada of Ukraine, Supreme Council of Belarus and Supreme Council of Kazakhstan, however, the faction never functioned.

During her tenure, Ettyryntyna held centrist position, for example, in April 1994 she did not approve the signing of the Treaty on Social Consensus, proposed by Yeltsin as a symbol of overcoming differences between political opponents, however, she also refused to sign a letter to the State Duma in July 1994 to call for a vote of no confidence to the Government of Russia.

After direct elections to the Federation Council were abolished and dual mandate principle of formation was adopted, many Federation Council members, including Ettyryntyna, would have been out of the body since January 1996. Maya Ettyryntyna decided to run for State Duma and was nominated by CPRF in the Chukotka constituency (which completely coincides with her current constituency). In December general election Ettyryntyna placed 2nd with 22.83% of the vote, losing to incumbent State Duma member Tatyana Nesterenko (Independent, 42.17%).

Ettyryntyna later worked in the Federation Council Apparatus. She died on 19 January 2002 at the age of 61.

== Personal life ==
Maya Ettyryntyna was married and had several children.

She also was member of the board of the Soviet Peace Fund.
