= Rudchenko =

Rudchenko (Ukrainian: Рудченко) is a Ukrainian surname. Notable people with the surname include:

- Panas Rudchenko, real name of Panas Myrny (1849–1920), Ukrainian writer
- Valentina Rudchenko (born 1955), Russian politician
