= Mikhail Orlov =

Mikhail Orlov may refer to:

- Mikhail Fyodorovich Orlov (1788–1842), Russian General-major and Decembrist
- Mikhail Orlov (racewalker) (born 1967), Russian race walker
- Mikhail Orlov (diplomat), Ambassador of the Soviet Union to Seychelles, 1981–1987
- Glenn Michael Souther, American defector to the Soviet Union who changed his name to Mikhail Yevgenyevich Orlov
