= Aramas Dallakyan =

Armenian-Russian politician

- Արամայիս Դալլաքյան

Senator from the Chukotka Autonomous Okrug on legislative authority
- In office 5 June 2015 – 1 October 2021
- Preceded by: Efim Malkin
- Succeeded by: Anastasia Zhukova

Chairman of the Duma of the Chukotka Autonomous Okrug
- In office 2 June 2013 – 5 June 2015
- Preceded by: Roman Abramovich
- Succeeded by: Valentina Rudchenko

Personal details
- Born: Aramas Dzhaganovich Dallakyan; 4 May 1951 (age 74); Vahan, Armenia, Soviet Union
- Political party: United Russia

Aramas Dzhaganovich Dallakyan (Armenian: Արամայիս Ջագանովիչ Դալլաքյան; born on 4 May 1951), is an Armenian-Russian politician who had served as the Senator from the Chukotka Autonomous Okrug on legislative authority from 2015 to 2021.

== Biography ==
=== Early life ===
Aramas Dallakyan was born in Vahan, Armenia on 4 May 1951. In 1977 he graduated from the Higher Komsomol School under the Central Committee of the Komsomol (now the Moscow Humanitarian University).

=== Komsomol (1977 – 1997) ===
From 1977 to 1990 he worked in Chukotka in the local leadership structures of the Komsomol and the CPSU. In 1990, he was the first deputy chairman of the Council of People's Deputies of the Chukotka Autonomous Okrug, and in 1993 he moved to the district administration. In 1996, he became the deputy governor of the Chukotka Autonomous Okrug serving under governors Aleksandr Nazarov and Roman Abramovich. He oversaw issues of immigration control and international relations, as well as organizational, administrative and legal issues, and managed the staff of the governor and the district government.

=== Higher education (1997 – 2011) ===
In 1997, he received a higher legal education from the Russian Academy of Public Administration under the President of the Russian Federation with a specialization in the field of state building and law. In 2006, he defended his dissertation for the degree of Candidate of Economic Sciences at the St. Petersburg State University of Engineering and Economics on the topic "Organizational and economic mechanism of financial stabilization of the northern regions: on materials of the Chukotka Autonomous Okrug".

=== Duma and Federation Council (2011 – present) ===
On 12 October 2008, he was elected as a deputy of the Duma of the Chukotka Autonomous Okrug of the IV convocation, and on October 22, he was elected deputy chairman of the Duma, who under Abramovich.

On March 13, 2011, he was elected to the Chukotka Duma of the 5th convocation from one of the two three-mandate constituencies, and on March 29, he was re-elected as one of the three first deputy chairmen, who again became Abramovich.

On 2 July 2013, Dallakyan was elected Chairman of the Duma after Abramovich left.

On 2 June 2015, the representative of the legislative body of state power of Chukotka in the Federation Council, Efim Malkin, prematurely abandoned his mandate. Dallakyan wrote a statement about his dismissal from the post of chairman of the Chukotka Duma on 5 June 2015, and the deputies unanimously supported him, electing Valentina Rudchenko as the new speaker at the proposal of the United Russia faction and, based on the results of a secret ballot, endowing Dallakyan with the powers of a member of the Federation Council.

On 1 October 2021, he left the Federation Council.

== Awards ==
- Medal of the Order “For Merit to the Fatherland”, 2nd class (6 July 1999) — for services to the state, many years of conscientious work, and significant contribution to strengthening friendship and cooperation among peoples.
- Honored Lawyer of the Russian Federation (3 October 2011) — for active legislative activity and many years of dedicated service.
