= By-elections to the 2nd Russian State Duma =

By-elections to the 2nd State Duma of the Russian Federation were held to fill vacant seats in the State Duma between the 1995 election and the 1999 election.

Constituency	Date	Former MP	Party	Cause	Winner	Party	Retained
Makhachkala No.11, Dagestan	8 December 1996	Gamid Gamidov	Independent	New post	Nadirshakh Khachilayev	Union of Muslims of Russia	No
Tula No.176, Tula Oblast	9 February 1997	Alexander Lebed	KRO	New post	Alexander Korzhakov	Independent	No
Kirov No.92, Kirov Oblast	23 March 1997	Vladimir Sergeyenkov	Independent	New post	Nikolay Shaklein	Independent	Yes
Anna No.74, Voronezh Oblast	23 March 1997	Ivan Rybkin	Ivan Rybkin Bloc	New post	Dmitry Rogozin	KRO	No
Petrovsky No.54, Stavropol Krai	20 April 1997	Alexander Chernogorov	CPRF	New post	Vasily Khmyrov	CPRF	Yes
Magadan No.103, Magadan Oblast	18 May 1997	Valentin Tsvetkov	Independent	New post	Vladimir Butkeyev	DVR	No
Khakassia No.30, Khakassia	1 June 1997	Aleksey Lebed	Independent	New post	Vacant. By-election declared invalid due to low turnout.		No
Proletarsky No.145, Rostov Oblast	1 June 1997	Sergey Shakhray	PRES	New post	Nikolay Kolomeytsev	CPRF	No
Pavlovsk No.76, Voronezh Oblast	22 June 1997	Aleksandr Merkulov	CPRF	New post	Yelena Panina	Russian Zemstvo movement	No
Kyshtym No.184, Chelyabinsk Oblast	29 June 1997	Pyotr Sumin	KRO	New post	Vacant. By-election declared invalid due to low turnout.		No
Sovetsky No.186, Chelyabinsk Oblast	29 June 1997	Vladimir Utkin	KRO	New post	Vacant. By-election declared invalid due to low turnout.		No
Agin-Buryat No.215, ABAO	14 September 1997	Bair Zhamsuyev	Independent	New post	Iosif Kobzon	Independent	Yes
Georgiyevsk No.52, Stavropol Krai	14 September 1997	Nikolay Manzhosov	CPRF	Death	Ivan Meshcherin	CPRF	Yes
Khakassia No.30, Khakassia	26 October 1997	None	None	Nobody received enough votes in the previous by-election	Georgy Maytakov	NDR	No
Ordzhonikidzevsky No.165, Sverdlovsk Oblast	23 November 1997	Galina Karelova	Independent	New post	Vacant. By-election declared invalid due to low turnout.		No
Kyshtym No.184, Chelyabinsk Oblast	14 December 1997	None	None	Nobody received enough votes in the previous by-election	Vladimir Gorbachyov	NDR	No
Magnitogorsk No.185, Chelyabinsk Oblast	14 December 1997	Alexander Pochinok	DVR–OD	New post	Alexander Chershintsev	Independent	No
Sovetsky No.186, Chelyabinsk Oblast	14 December 1997	None	None	Nobody received enough votes in the previous by-election	Valery Gartung	Independent	No
Birsk No.3, Bashkortostan	8 February 1998	Alzam Sayfullin	APR	Death	Vladimir Protopopov	Independent	No
Buynaksk No.10, Dagestan	29 March 1998	Ramazan Abdulatipov	Independent	New post	Magomedfazil Azizov	Independent	Yes
Balakovo No.156, Saratov Oblast	29 March 1998	Alexander Maksakov	CPRF	Death	Nikolay Sukhoy	APR	No
Orekhovo-Borisovo No.197, Moscow	12 April 1998	Irina Hakamada	Common Cause	New post	Andrei Nikolayev	Union of People's Power and Labor	No
Ordzhonikidzevsky No.165, Sverdlovsk Oblast	12 April 1998	None	None	Nobody received enough votes in the previous by-election	Dmitry Golovanov	Independent	Yes
Kamchatka No.87, Kamchatka Oblast	19 April 1998	Mikhail Zadornov	Yabloko	New post	Alexander Zaveryukha	APR	No
Gorny Altai No.2, Altai Republic	31 May 1998	Semyon Zubakin	DVR–OD	New post	Mikhail Lapshin	APR	No
Chukotka No.223, Chukotka	31 May 1998	Tatyana Nesterenko	Independent	New post	Vladimir Babichev	NDR	No
North Ossetian No.21, North Ossetia	21 June 1998	Alexander Dzasokhov	Independent	New post	Khazbi Bogov	Independent	Yes
Dzerzhinsk No.119, Nizhny Novgorod Oblast	27 September 1998	Mikhail Seslavinsky	NDR	New post	Ardalyen Panteleyev	Independent	No
Yamalo-Nenets No.225, Yamalo-Nenets AO	27 September 1998	Vladimir Goman	Independent	New post	Vacant. By-election declared invalid due to lack of candidates.		No
Engels No.159, Saratov Oblast	18 October 1998	Oleg Mironov	CPRF	New post	Vasily Desyatnikov	NDR	No
Kanevskaya No.39, Krasnodar Krai	22 November 1998	Aleksandr Petrik	CPRF	Death	Aleksandr Burulko	CPRF	Yes
Lyublino No.195, Moscow	6 December 1998	Boris Fyodorov	Forward, Russia!	New post	Vacant. By-election declared invalid due to low turnout.		No
