= 2026 Chukotka Autonomous Okrug legislative election =

Regional legislative election in Russia

- 18–20 September 2026

All 15 seats in the Duma 8 seats needed for a majority
- Turnout: 52.99% ▼4.70 pp

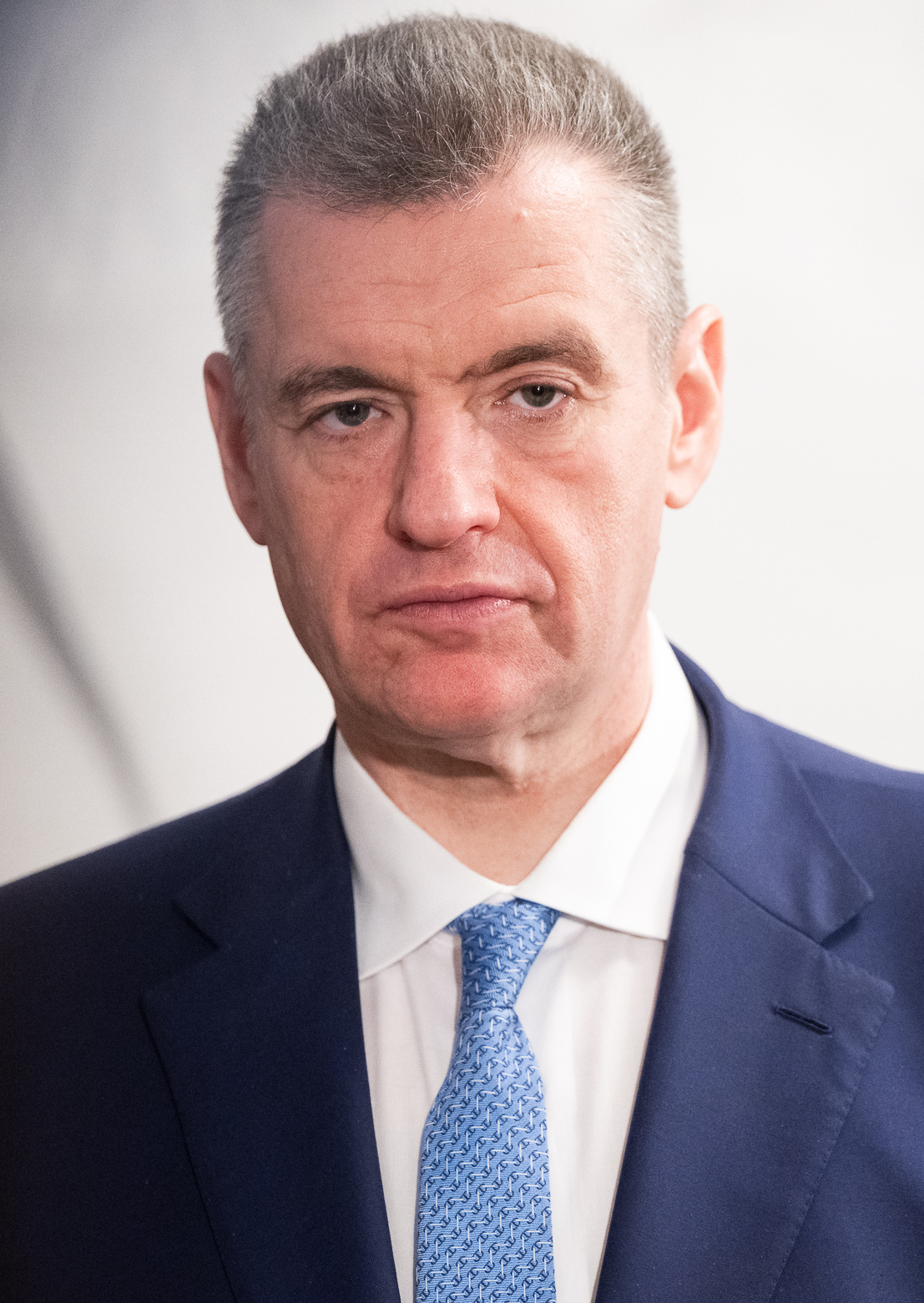
	Majority party	Minority party
Candidate	Leonid Nikolayev	Leonid Slutsky
Party	United Russia	LDPR
Last election	44.86%, 11 seats	22.20%, 1 seat
Seats won	12	1
Seat change	▲1	Steady
Popular vote	9,705	2,514
Percentage	59.93%	15.52%
Swing	▲15.07 pp	▼6.68 pp
	Third party	Fourth party
	CPRF	SR
Candidate	Vladimir Galtsov	Anton Lobanov
Party	CPRF	A Just Russia
Last election	15.91%, 1 seat	12.26%, 1 seat
Seats won	1	1
Seat change	Steady	Steady
Popular vote	1,856	1,427
Percentage	11.46%	8.81%
Swing	▼4.45 pp	▼3.45 pp
Chairman before election
Leonid Nikolayev
United Russia
Elected Chairman
Leonid Nikolayev
United Russia
Senator before election
Anastasia Zhukova
United Russia
Senator after election
Sergey Karginov
LDPR

The 2026 Duma of the Chukotka Autonomous Okrug election took place on 18–20 September 2026, on common election day, coinciding with the 2026 Russian legislative election. All 15 seats in the Duma were up for re-election.

United Russia increased its already overwhelming majority in the Duma, winning 59.9% of the vote and all 6 seats in triple-mandate constituencies. Liberal Democratic Party of Russia, Communist Party of the Russian Federation and A Just Russia all retained their factions, although with decreased vote shares.

== Electoral system ==
Under current election laws, the Duma is elected for a term of five years, with parallel voting. 9 seats are elected by party-list proportional representation with a 5% electoral threshold, with the other part elected in 2 triple-member constituencies by block voting. Seats in the proportional part are allocated using the Imperiali quota, modified to ensure that every party list, which passes the threshold, receives at least one mandate.

== Candidates ==
=== Party lists ===
To register regional lists of candidates, parties need to collect 0.5% of signatures of all registered voters in the Chukotka Autonomous Okrug.

The following parties were relieved from the necessity to collect signatures:

- United Russia
- Communist Party of the Russian Federation
- Liberal Democratic Party of Russia
- A Just Russia
- New People

№	Party	Party-list leaders	Candidates	Status
1	United Russia	Leonid Nikolayev • Yelena Yevtyukhova • Aleksandr Agapov • Lyubov Bryantseva • Ignat Skobelev	16	Registered
2	A Just Russia	Anton Lobanov • Samira Vukvukay • Denis Litovka • Yelena Zimina • Irina Meshcheryakova	14	Registered
3	Communist Party	Vladimir Galtsov • Maria Leyta • Yelena Yarygina • Anatoly Rakitin • Konstantin Lutsenko	15	Registered
4	Liberal Democratic Party	Leonid Slutsky • Sergey Karginov • Yulia Butakova • Natalya Antonova • Yekaterina Chekhovskaya	16	Registered

=== Triple-mandate constituencies ===
Two triple-mandate constituencies were formed in the Chukotka Autonomous Okrug. To register candidates in triple-mandate constituencies need to collect 3% of signatures of registered voters in the constituency.

Number of candidates in triple-mandate constituencies
Party	Candidates	
Party	Nominated	Registered
United Russia	6	6
A Just Russia	4	4
Independent	3	0
Total	13	13

== Results ==
=== Results by party lists ===
Summary of the 18–20 September 2026 Duma of the Chukotka Autonomous Okrug election results
Party	Party list					Constituency		Total	
Party	Votes	%	±pp	Seats	+/–	Seats	+/–	Seats	+/–
United Russia	9,705	59.93	▲15.07	6	Steady	6	▲1	12	▲1
Liberal Democratic Party	2,514	15.52	▼6.68	1	Steady	–	–	1	Steady
Communist Party	1,856	11.46	▼4.45	1	Steady	–	–	1	Steady
A Just Russia	1,427	8.81	▼3.45	1	Steady	0	Steady	1	Steady
Invalid ballots	692	4.27	▼0.46	—	—	—	—	—	—
Total	16,194	100.00	—	9	Steady	6	Steady	15	Steady
Turnout	16,194	52.99	▼4.70	—	—	—	—	—	—
Registered voters	30,559	100.00	—	—	—	—	—	—	—

Leonid Nikolayev (United Russia) was re-elected as Chairman of the Duma. State Duma member Sergey Karginov (LDPR) was appointed to the Federation Council, replacing incumbent Senator Anastasia Zhukova (United Russia).

=== Results in triple-member constituencies ===
==== District 1 ====
Summary of the 18–20 September 2026 Duma of the Chukotka Autonomous Okrug election in Eastern constituency No.1
Candidate	Party	Votes	%
Natalya Kymyyet	United Russia	5,688	61.69%
Vadim Tegrettyn	United Russia	5,152	55.88%
Vladislav Zotikov	United Russia	4,837	52.36%
Aleksandr Semerikov	A Just Russia	2,036	22.08%
Arltan Erdniyev	A Just Russia	1,585	17.19%
Total		9,220	100%

==== District 2 ====
Summary of the 18–20 September 2026 Duma of the Chukotka Autonomous Okrug election in Western constituency No.2
Candidate	Party	Votes	%
Lyudmila Danilova	United Russia	3,734	54.54%
Yevgeny Patrushev	United Russia	3,295	48.13%
Viktor Yelagin	United Russia	2,879	42.05%
Valentina Khristoforova	A Just Russia	1,807	26.39%
Darina Tyutyunnik	A Just Russia	1,627	23.77%
Total		6,846	100%

=== Members ===
Incumbent deputies are highlighted with bold, elected members who declined to take a seat are marked with ~~strikethrough~~.

Constituency
No.	Member	Party
1	Natalya Kymyyet	United Russia
1	Vadim Tegrettyn	United Russia
1	Vladislav Zotikov	United Russia
2	Lyudmila Danilova	United Russia
2	Yevgeny Patrushev	United Russia
2	Viktor Yelagin	United Russia

Party lists
Member	Party
Leonid Nikolayev	United Russia
~~Yelena Yevtyukhova~~	United Russia
Aleksandr Agapov	United Russia
~~Lyubov Bryantseva~~	United Russia
Ignat Skobelev	United Russia
Yevgeny Bukhlov	United Russia
Emilia Ramazanova	United Russia
Pyotr Klimov	United Russia
~~Leonid Slutsky~~	Liberal Democratic Party
Sergey Karginov	Liberal Democratic Party
Vladimir Galtsov	Communist Party
Anton Lobanov	A Just Russia

== See also ==
- 2026 Russian regional elections
