= Yelena Yevtyukhova =

Russian politician

- Елена Евтюхова
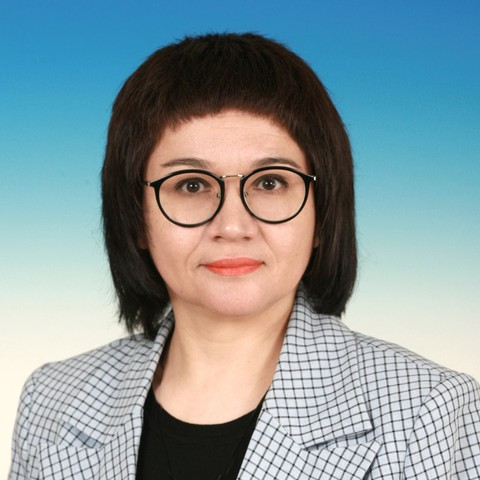
- Official portrait, 2021

Deputy Governor of Chukotka Autonomous Okrug
- Incumbent
- Assumed office 6 October 2026
- Governor: Vladislav Kuznetsov
- Preceded by: Office established

Member of the State Duma
- In office 19 September 2021 – 30 September 2026
- Preceded by: Valentina Rudchenko
- Succeeded by: Aleksandr Dudorov
- Constituency: Chukotka-at-large (No. 224)

Personal details
- Born: 7 August 1970 (age 56) Ust-Belaya, Anadyrsky District, Chukotka National Okrug, Magadan Oblast, Russian SFSR, Soviet Union
- Party: United Russia
- Education: Moscow State University of Economics, Statistics, and Informatics

Yelena Aleksandrovna Yevtyukhova (Russian: Елена Александровна Евтюхова; born 7 August 1970) is a Russian civil servant and politician of Chukchi descent. Yevtyukhova served a term as a member of the State Duma from Chukotka Autonomous Okrug from 2021 to 2026.

== Early life and education ==
Yelena Yevtyukhova was born on 7 August 1970 in Ust-Belaya village, 213 km southwest of Anadyr.

From 1987 to 1990 Yevtyukhova studied in Anadyr Pedagogical College of Indigenous People of the North. She graduated with a degree of "primary school teacher". In 2013 Yevtyukhova graduated Moscow State University of Economics, Statistics, and Informatics with a speciality in law.

== Career ==
For 25 years Yelena Yevtykhova worked in Chaunsky District. She started working as a teacher but later continued her career in public sector as main advisor at the regional Department of Indigenous People Affairs. Then she became Deputy Head of Administration of Chaunsky District.

In 2015 Governor Roman Kopin appointed Yelena Yevtyukhova as Head of the Department of Indigenous People Affairs and Deputy Head of Governor's Office. That year Yevtyukhova was also elected as chairwoman of the regional council of United Russia supporters.

For the 2021 State Duma election incumbent deputy for the Chukotka constituency Valentina Rudchenko declined to seek re-election, and Yevtyukhova ran to replace the retiring deputy. Yevtyukhova won the United Russia primary in the constituency with 28.43% of the vote. She also won a primary for Duma of Chukotka Autonomous Okrug, finishing ahead of Rudchenko in a party list contest. In the general election Yelena Yevtyukhova placed first in the constituency with 36.95% of the vote. She also was elected to the Duma of Chukotka Autonomous Okrug but chose to work in the State Duma instead.

In the State Duma Yevtyukhova joined United Russia faction and was appointed to the Committee on Russian Far East and Arctic Development. In December 2021 Yevtyukhova changed her committee assignments and joined Duma Committee on Nationalities. She also currently served on Liaison Deputies' Groups to the Balkan states, to Finland, and to Norway.

On 15 February 2022 Yevtyukhova was one of 351 State Duma members, who approved a letter to President Vladimir Putin, asking her to recognise the independence of Donetsk and Lugansk people's republics, both breakaway states were recognised by the Russian Federation on 21 February. Two days later the European Union placed sanctions on all 351 State Duma members who voted to approve a letter to Putin, including Yelena Yevtyukhova. On 24 March Yevtyukhova was designated by the OFAC as one of the key enablers of the Russian invasion and was put under US sanctions along with 328 fellow State Duma members.

In April 2026 Yelena Yevtyukhova announced she would not seek a second term in the State Duma and intend to return working in Chukotka. Yevtyukhova then endorsed former Deputy Governor of Nenets Autonomous Okrug Aleksandr Dudorov as her successor in the federal parliament.

Instead, Yevtyukhova ran for Duma of the Chukotka Autonomous Okrug, placing second on the United Russia party list. United Russia received six party-list seats in the September 2026 election, however, Yevtyukhova declined to take a seat and left it for okrug hospital chief doctor Emilia Ramazanova.

On October 6, 2026, Governor of Chukotka Autonomous Okrug Vladislav Kuznetsov appointed Yevtyukhova as his first deputy. Yevtyukhova was put in charge of indigenous people affairs, which would be the first time the position had the first deputy governor rank.
