= Merzlyakov =

Merzlyakov (Russian: Мерзляков, from мерзнуть meaning to freeze, be cold) is a Russian masculine surname. Its feminine counterpart is Merzlyakova. It may refer to

- Aleksey Merzlyakov (1778–1830), Russian poet, critic and translator
- Yuri Merzlyakov (born 1949), Russian diplomat
