= List of ambassadors of Russia to the Comoros =

Ambassador of the Russian Federation to the Union of the Comoros
- Emblem of the Russian Foreign Ministry
- Incumbent; Andrey Andreyev since 2 December 2020
- Ministry of Foreign Affairs; Embassy of Russia in Antananarivo
- Style: His Excellency; The Honourable
- Reports to: Minister of Foreign Affairs
- Seat: Antananarivo
- Appointer: President of Russia
- Term length: At the pleasure of the president
- Website: Embassy of Russia in Madagascar

The ambassador of Russia to the Comoros is the official representative of the president and the government of the Russian Federation to the president and the government of the Comoros.

The ambassador and his staff work at large in the Russian embassy in Antananarivo, Madagascar. The current Russian ambassador to the Comoros is Andrey Andreyev, incumbent since 2 December 2020. The ambassador to the Comoros is a non-resident ambassador who has dual accreditation as ambassador to Madagascar since 1993.

== History of diplomatic relations ==
Diplomatic relations between the Soviet Union and the Comoros were established on 6 January 1976. Relations were initially handled through the Soviet embassy in Seychelles, with the Soviet ambassador to Seychelles dually accredited to the Comoros. The first ambassador, Aleksandr Startsev, was appointed on 20 January 1978. The practice continued until the third ambassador, Viktor Anisimov, who served concurrently as ambassador to the Seychelles and to the Comoros until 20 February 1991, when he was replaced as ambassador to the Seychelles, but retained his post to the Comoros, now solely accredited. With the dissolution of the Soviet Union in 1991, the Comoros recognised the Russian Federation as its successor state. The incumbent Soviet ambassador, Anisimov, continued as the Russian ambassador until December 1993. He was succeeded by Yuri Merzlyakov, the incumbent ambassador to Madagascar, who was given concurrent accreditation as the ambassador to Comoros.

== List of representatives of Russia to the Comoros (1978–present) ==
=== Ambassadors of the Soviet Union to the Comoros (1978–1991) ===
Name	Title	Appointment	Termination	Notes
Aleksandr Startsev	Ambassador	20 January 1978	10 August 1981	Concurrently ambassador to Seychelles; Credentials presented on 29 January 1978
Mikhail Orlov	Ambassador	16 May 1983	10 April 1987	Concurrently ambassador to Seychelles; Credentials presented on 22 July 1983
Viktor Anisimov	Ambassador	10 April 1987	25 December 1991	Concurrently ambassador to Seychelles until 20 February 1991

=== Ambassadors of the Russian Federation to the Comoros (1991–present) ===
Name	Title	Appointment	Termination	Notes
Viktor Anisimov	Ambassador	25 December 1991	28 December 1993	
Yuri Merzlyakov	Ambassador	28 December 1993	16 May 1997	Concurrently ambassador to Madagascar
Aleksandr Makarenko	Ambassador	16 May 1997	4 June 2001	Concurrently ambassador to Madagascar
Yuri Romanov	Ambassador	4 June 2001	16 February 2006	Concurrently ambassador to Madagascar
Vladimir Goncharenko	Ambassador	16 February 2006	19 June 2013	Concurrently ambassador to Madagascar
Stanislav Akhmedov	Ambassador	19 June 2013	2 December 2020	Concurrently ambassador to Madagascar
Andrey Andreyev	Ambassador	2 December 2020		Concurrently ambassador to Madagascar; Credentials presented on 5 July 2021
