= List of ambassadors of Russia to Madagascar =

Ambassador of the Russian Federation to the Republic of Madagascar
- Emblem of the Russian Foreign Ministry
- Incumbent; Andrey Andreyev since 2 December 2020
- Ministry of Foreign Affairs; Embassy of Russia in Antananarivo
- Style: His Excellency; The Honourable
- Reports to: Minister of Foreign Affairs
- Seat: Antananarivo
- Appointer: President of Russia
- Term length: At the pleasure of the president
- Website: Embassy of Russia in Madagascar

The ambassador of Russia to Madagascar is the official representative of the president and the government of the Russian Federation to the president and the government of Madagascar.

The ambassador and his staff work at large in the Russian embassy in Antananarivo. The current Russian ambassador to Madagascar is Andrey Andreyev, incumbent since 2 December 2020. The ambassador to Madagascar has had dual accreditation as the non-resident ambassador to the Comoros since 1993.

== History of diplomatic relations ==
Diplomatic relations between the Soviet Union and Madagascar were established on 29 September 1972. Relations were initially handled through the Soviet embassy in Paris, with the Soviet ambassador to France dually accredited to what was then the Malagasy Republic, and from 1975, the Democratic Republic of Madagascar. The first ambassador, Pyotr Abrasimov, was appointed on 20 December 1972. He was succeeded by Stepan Chervonenko as ambassador to France with concurrent accreditation to Madagascar in 1973. The embassy in Antananarivo was opened in 1974, and on 20 March 1974 Alexander Alexeyev was appointed as the first ambassador solely accredited to Madagascar.

With the dissolution of the Soviet Union in 1991, Madagascar recognised the Russian Federation as its successor state. The incumbent Soviet ambassador, Yuri Sepelyov, continued as the Russian ambassador until April 1993. He was succeeded by Yuri Merzlyakov, who in December 1993, was given concurrent accreditation as the ambassador to the Comoros. Prior to this, the ambassador to Seychelles had been concurrently accredited to the Comoros.

== List of representatives of Russia to Madagascar (1972–present) ==
=== Ambassadors of the Soviet Union to Madagascar (1972–1991) ===
Name	Title	Appointment	Termination	Notes
Pyotr Abrasimov	Ambassador	20 December 1972	9 April 1973	Concurrently ambassador to France; Credentials presented on 29 December 1972
Stepan Chervonenko	Ambassador	3 July 1973	20 March 1974	Concurrently ambassador to France; Credentials presented on 24 August 1973
Alexander Alexeyev	Ambassador	20 March 1974	7 June 1980	Credentials presented on 8 June 1974
Leonid Musatov	Ambassador	7 June 1980	20 October 1986	Credentials presented on 12 June 1980
Pavel Petrik	Ambassador	20 October 1986	11 October 1989	
Yuri Sepelyov	Ambassador	11 October 1989	25 December 1991	

=== Ambassadors of the Russian Federation to Madagascar (1991–present) ===
Name	Title	Appointment	Termination	Notes
Yuri Sepelyov	Ambassador	25 December 1991	29 April 1993	
Yuri Merzlyakov	Ambassador	29 April 1993	16 May 1997	
Aleksandr Makarenko	Ambassador	16 May 1997	4 June 2001	
Yuri Romanov	Ambassador	4 June 2001	16 February 2006	
Vladimir Goncharenko	Ambassador	16 February 2006	19 June 2013	
Stanislav Akhmedov	Ambassador	19 June 2013	2 December 2020	Credentials presented on 11 September 2013
Andrey Andreyev	Ambassador	2 December 2020		Credentials presented on 7 April 2021
