= Vahan, Armenia =

Village in Gegharkunik, Armenia

Vahan Վահան
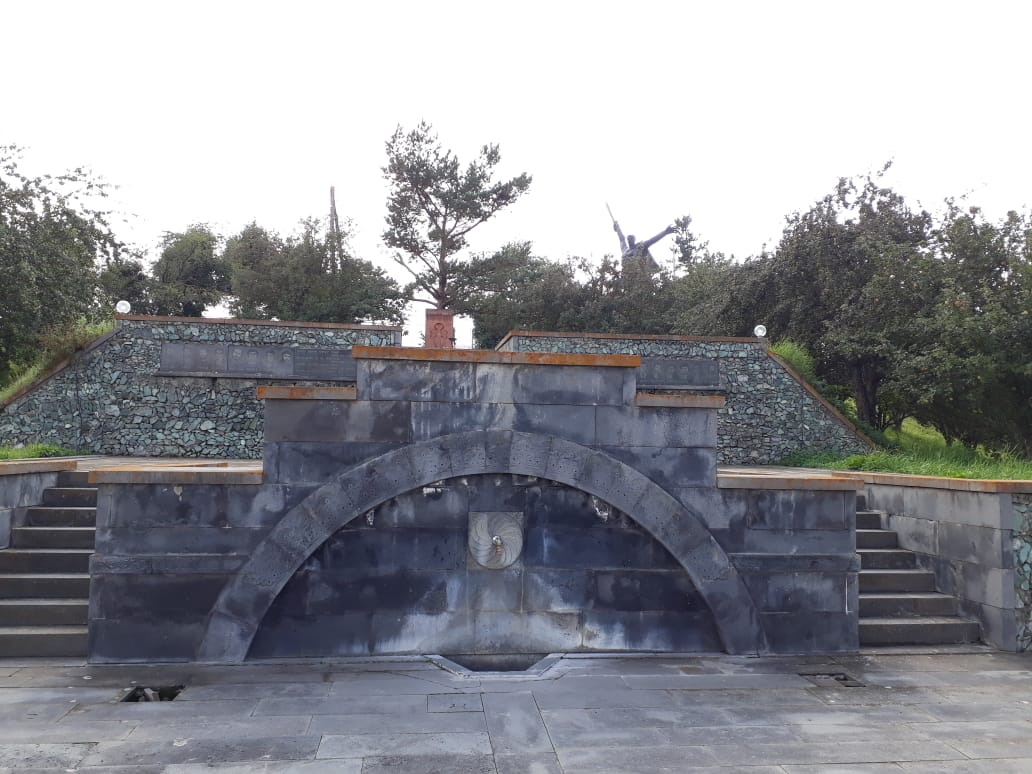
- WWII monument in Vahan

- Location within Armenia Location within Gegharkunik
- Coordinates: 40°34′32″N 45°23′56″E
- Country: Armenia
- Province: Gegharkunik
- Municipality: Chambarak
- Founded: 1925
- Elevation: 1,926 m (6,319 ft)

Population (2011)
  - Total: 1,127
- Time zone: UTC+4 (AMT)
- Postal code: 1318

Vahan (Armenian: Վահան) is a village in the Chambarak Municipality of the Gegharkunik Province of Armenia. Nearby upon a hill towards the eastern end of the village is an early Iron Age cyclopean fort.

== Etymology ==
When the village was founded in 1925, it was named Ordzhonikidze in honor of Soviet politician and politburo member, Sergo Ordzhonikidze.

== Notable people ==
- Aramas Dallakyan, politician

== Gallery ==
World War II monument in Vahan

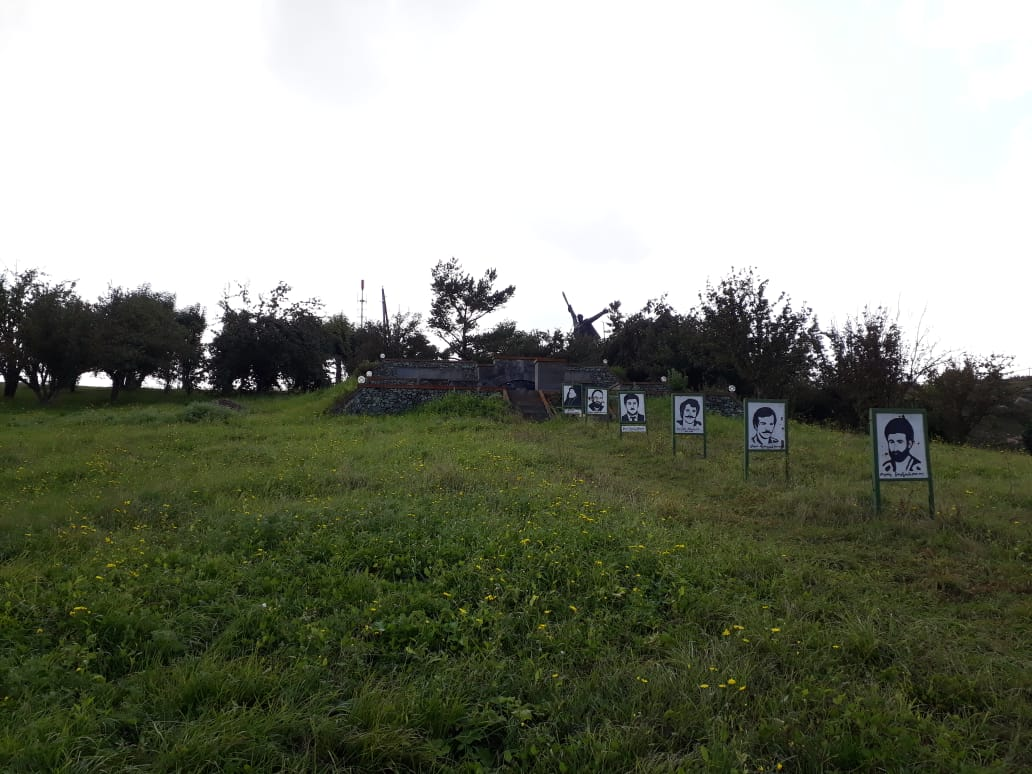

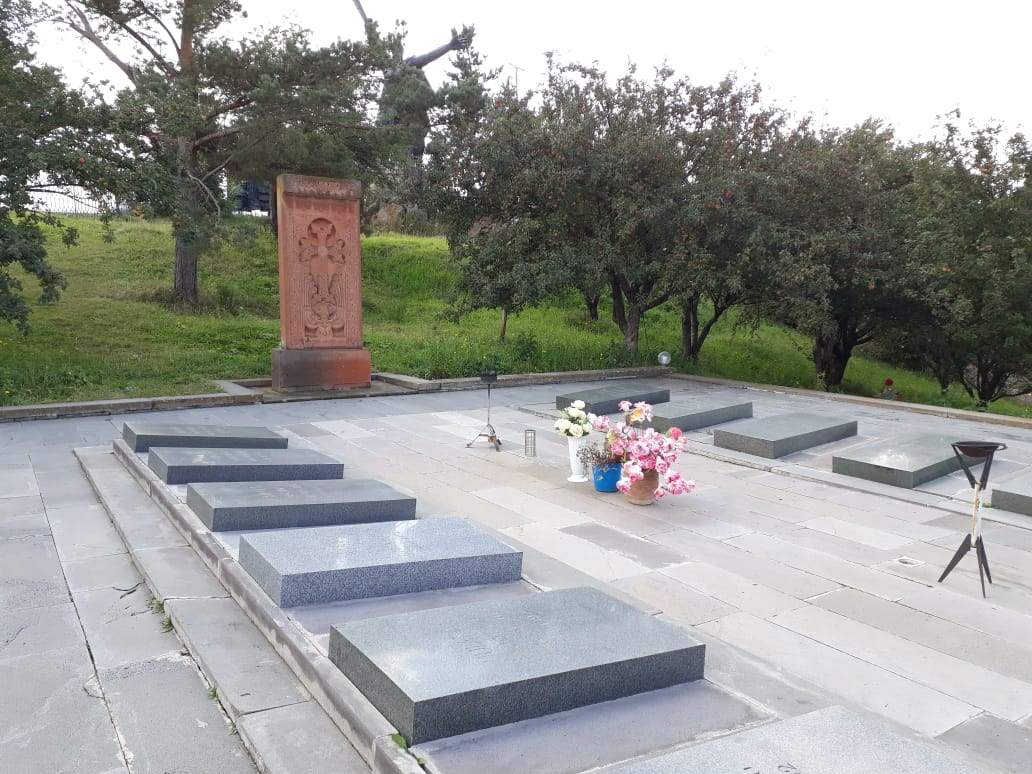

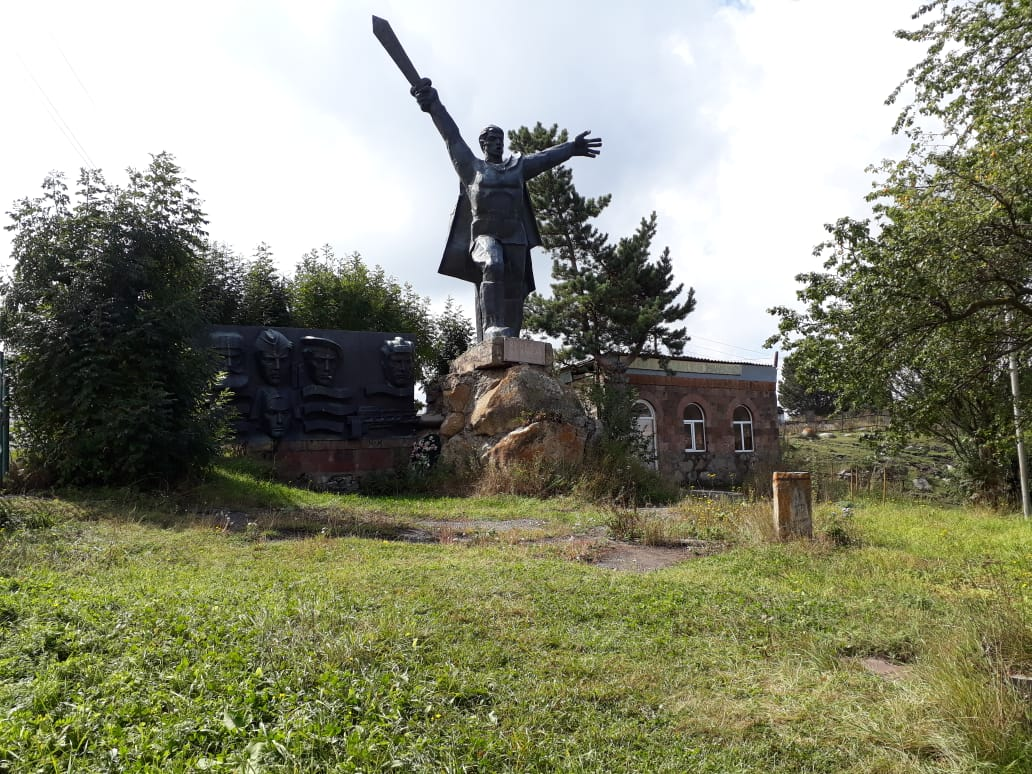
