= List of ambassadors of Russia to Kazakhstan =

Ambassador of the Russian Federation to the Republic of Kazakhstan
- Emblem of the Russian Foreign Ministry

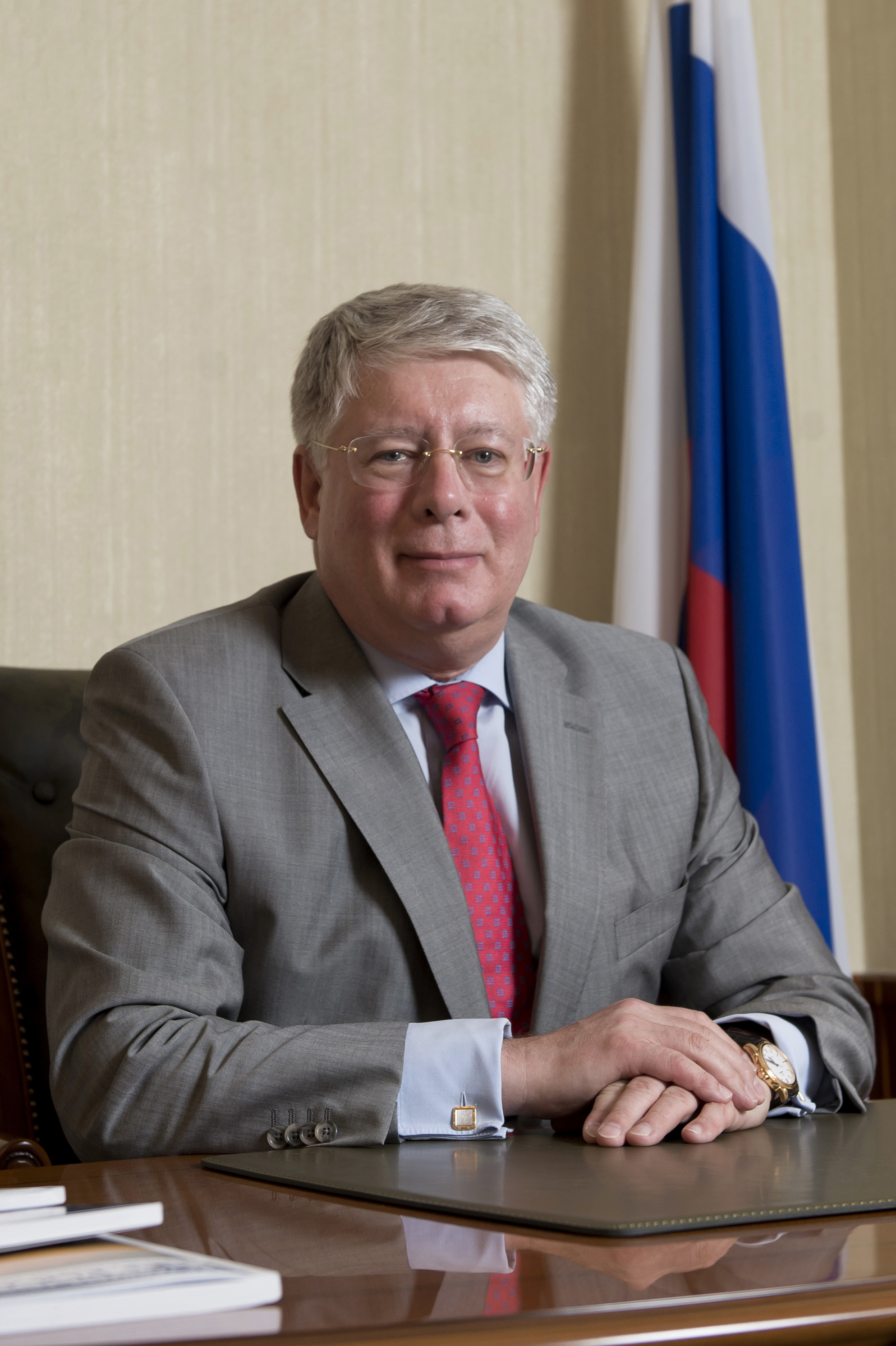
- Incumbent; Aleksey Borodavkin since 7 February 2018
- Ministry of Foreign Affairs; Embassy of Russia in Astana
- Style: His Excellency; The Honourable
- Reports to: Minister of Foreign Affairs
- Seat: Astana
- Appointer: President of Russia
- Term length: At the pleasure of the president
- Website: Embassy of Russia in Kazakhstan

The ambassador extraordinary and plenipotentiary of the Russian Federation to Kazakhstan is the official representative of the president and the government of the Russian Federation to the president and the government of Kazakhstan.

The ambassador and his staff work at large in the Embassy of Russia in Astana. There are consulates general in Almaty, Oral and Oskemen. The post of Russian ambassador to Kazakhstan is currently held by Aleksey Borodavkin, incumbent since 7 February 2018.

== History of diplomatic relations ==
With the dissolution of the Soviet Union in 1991, diplomatic relations between the Russian Federation and the Republic of Kazakhstan were first established on 22 October 1992. The first ambassador, Boris Krasnikov, was appointed in 1992.

== Representatives of the Russian Federation to Kazakhstan (1992–present) ==
Name	Title	Appointment	Termination	Notes
Boris Krasnikov	Ambassador	1992	13 September 1994	
Vyacheslav Dolgov	Ambassador	13 September 1994	17 April 1997	
Valery Nikolayenko	Ambassador	17 April 1997	31 December 1999	
Yuri Merzlyakov	Ambassador	31 December 1999	2 July 2003	
Vladimir Babichev	Ambassador	2 July 2003	9 November 2006	Credentials presented on 8 August 2003
Mikhail Bocharnikov	Ambassador	14 November 2006	7 February 2018	Credentials presented on 12 December 2006
Aleksey Borodavkin	Ambassador	7 February 2018		Credentials presented on 29 November 2023
