= Valentina Rudchenko =

Russian politician

Valentina Rudchenko MP
- Валентина Рудченко
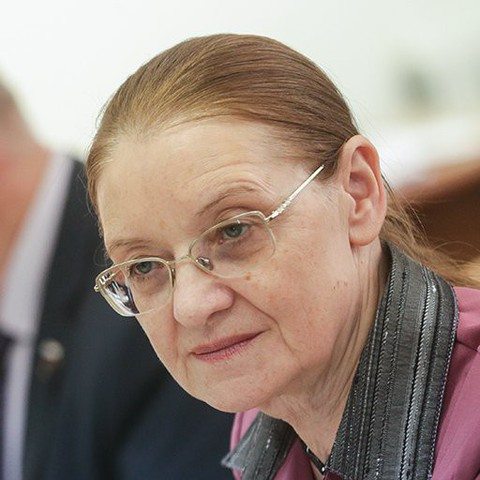
- Rudchenko in 2016

Member of Duma of Chukotka Autonomous Okrug
- In office 19 September 2021 – 2 October 2026
- Constituency: United Russia party list
- In office 10 April 1994 – 18 September 2016
- Constituency: Chukotsky No.12 (1994–2005); Eastern No.3 (2005–2011); United Russia party list (2011–2016)

Chairwoman of the Duma of Chukotka Autonomous Okrug
- In office 1 October 2021 – 20 September 2024
- Preceded by: Aleksandr Maslov
- Succeeded by: Leonid Nikolayev
- In office 5 June 2015 – 18 September 2016
- Preceded by: Aramas Dallakyan
- Succeeded by: Aleksandr Maslov

Member of State Duma
- In office 5 October 2016 – 12 October 2021
- Preceded by: constituency re-established
- Succeeded by: Yelena Yevtyukhova
- Constituency: Chukotka-at-large (No. 224)

Personal details
- Born: 26 April 1955 (age 71) Kharik, Kuytunsky District, Irkutsk Oblast, RSFSR, USSR
- Party: United Russia (since 2002)
- Education: Pedagogical Institute of Irkutsk State University; Saint Petersburg University of the Ministry of Internal Affairs of Russia

Valentina Vasilyevna Rudchenko (Russian: Валентина Васильевна Рудченко; born 26 April 1955) is a Russian politician and former speaker of the Duma of Chukotka Autonomous Okrug (2015–2016, 2021–2024). She also served as a member of State Duma from Chukotka AO (2016–2021).

== Early life ==
Valentina Rudchenko was born on 26 April 1955 in Kharik village, near Zima, in central Irkutsk Oblast.

In 1976 Rudchenko graduated Pedagogical Institute of Irkutsk State University as teacher of Russian and literature. After graduation she was assigned to Lorino village in Chukotka as teacher of Russian. Rudchenko was promoted to Department of People's Education of Chukotsky District in 1983, where she worked as guidance counsellor and, later, as head of the guidance cabinet.

In 1994 Valentina Rudchenko joined Department of Education of Chukotka Autonomous Okrug. There she headed institute of staff training (1994-1995) and higher and middle special education division (1995-1997).

== Duma of the Chukotka AO ==
Valentina Rudchenko was elected to the Duma of Chukotka Autonomous Okrug of the first convocation in 1994.

In 1996 Rudchenko was re-elected in the constituency No.12 as an independent with 22.9% of the vote. She became first deputy to Duma Speaker Vasily Nazarenko in January 1997.

In 1999 Valentina Rudchenko was appointed Head of Administration of Chukotsky District. The district suffered recession after 1998 financial crisis, and Rudchenko was assigned as anti-crisis manager to administer recovery process. As district head, Rudchenko quickly handled deficit of basic products and secured supplies.

In 2000 Rudchenko graduated Saint Petersburg University of the Ministry of Internal Affairs of Russia with a degree in law.

Valentina Rudchenko was re-elected as member of the Okrug Duma in 2000 with 27.5% of the vote. She left her position as Head of Chukotsky District in March 2001 after her appointment as Deputy Speaker of the Duma and Chair of the Duma Committee on Social Policy. In 2002 Rudchenko joined United Russia party. In September 2005 Rudchenko was in a shortlist of candidates for Governor of Chukotka AO, however, incumbent Governor Roman Abramovich was re-appointed by the Okrug Duma.

In 2005 Rudchenko was re-elected in constituency No.2 with 62.81% of the vote. She received the posts of Chair of the United Russia faction and First Deputy Speaker of the Duma. Speaker Nazarenko resigned in 2008 and was succeeded by former Governor Roman Abramovich, but Rudchenko retained her position. In 2008 she also led Chukotka public reception of President Dmitry Medvedev.

In 2011 Rudchenko was re-elected, running in the United Russia party lis as No.2, after Abramovich. She retained her position as First Deputy Speaker. In July 2013 Abramovich resigned to comply with federal law prohibiting Russian statesmen having foreign assets. His close associate and deputy Aramais Dallakian was elected as next Speaker.

On 2 June 2015 Dallakian was appointed to the Federation Council by Duma of Chukotka Autonomous Okrug. Valentina Rudchenko was elected as Speaker of the Duma the same day. In 2015 Rudchenko also became secretary of the United Russia regional office.

== State Duma ==
In 2016 Valentina Rudchenko decided to run for State Duma in re-established Chukotka constituency. She won United Russia primary in the constituency on 22 May 2016. In the general election Rudchenko placed first with 56.54% of the vote.

Valentina Rudchenko joined United Russia faction in the State Duma and was appointed to the Committee on Regional Policy and Problems of the Far East and the Arctic. Rudchenko generally maintained a low profile during her term in the Duma and co-sponsored 16 bills and amendments (but none proposed individually).

In 2017 Rudchenko became one of the richest female Russian politicians and placed 10th in ratings with an income of 10.5 million rubles.

In 2020 Valentina Rudchenko was rated as one of State Duma members with the least chances for re-election. She subsequently declined to seek a second term in the State Duma and opted to run for the Duma of Chukotka Autonomous Okrug instead.

== Later career ==
Valentina Rudchenko ran in the United Russia primary for the Duma of Chukotka AO in 2021. In the preliminary election Rudchenko placed only third, behind Indigenous People Department head Yelena Yevtyukhova and Chukotka Multi-profile College director Lyubov Makhaeva. However, in the final party list Ruchenko held No.3 position (No.1 and No.2 held Governor Roman Kopin and Yelena Yevtyukhova, respectively).

In the general election United Russia placed first with 44.86% of the vote and received 6 party list mandates, thus allowing Rudchenko to return the Okrug Duma. Roman Kopin decided to remain Governor of Chukotka AO and gave up his seat and Yelena Yevtyukhova was elected to the State Duma. Valentina Rudchenko was regarded as top-tier candidate to replace retiring Federation Council Senator Aramais Dallakian but on 1 October 2021 current Chukotka Commissioner for Human Rights and former First Deputy Governor of Chukotka (2014-2016) Anastasia Zhukova was elected to the Federation Council. The same day Valentina Rudchenko regained the position of Speaker of the Duma of Chukotka AO, which she held in 2015–2016.

On September 20, 2024, Valentina Rudchenko announced her resignation from the position of Chairwoman of the Duma of Chukotka AO, alongside her deputy Mikhail Andreyev. The Duma approved their resignation and former Mayor of Anadyr Leonid Nikolayev, who entered the chamber after 2024 by-elections, was elected as new speaker. Rudchenko remained Member of the Duma, becoming Member of the Committee on Social Policy and Deputy Chairwoman of the Commission on Rules.

== Honours ==
- Order of Friendship (2006)
- "Excellence in Public Education of the RSFSR" merit badge
- Letter of Gratitude of the State Duma
- Letter of Gratitude of the Ministry of Education
- "For Service to Chukotka" merit badge
- "For Service in Regional Law Development" merit badge
