= Federal Treasury =

- Федеральное казначейство
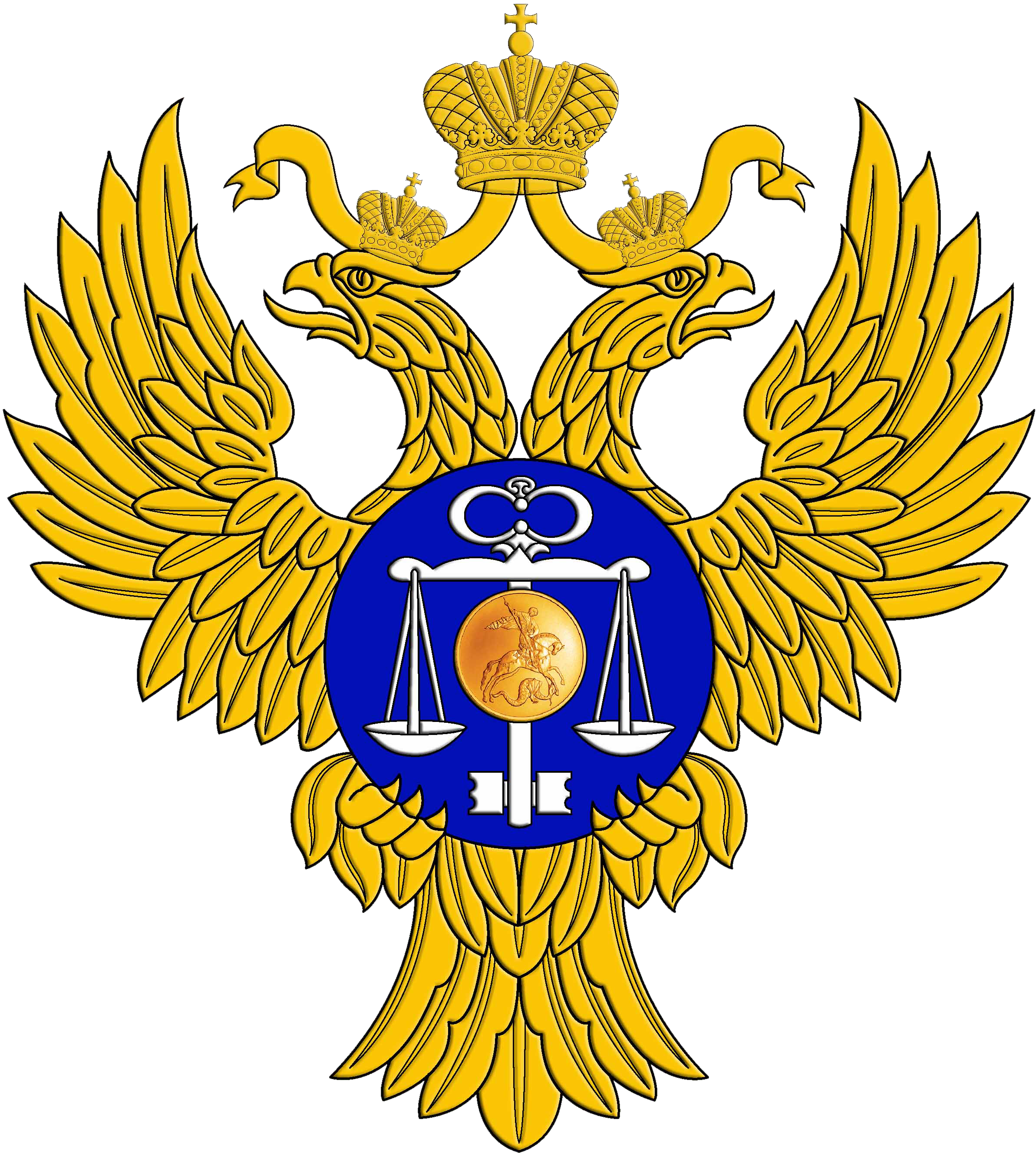
- Official emblem

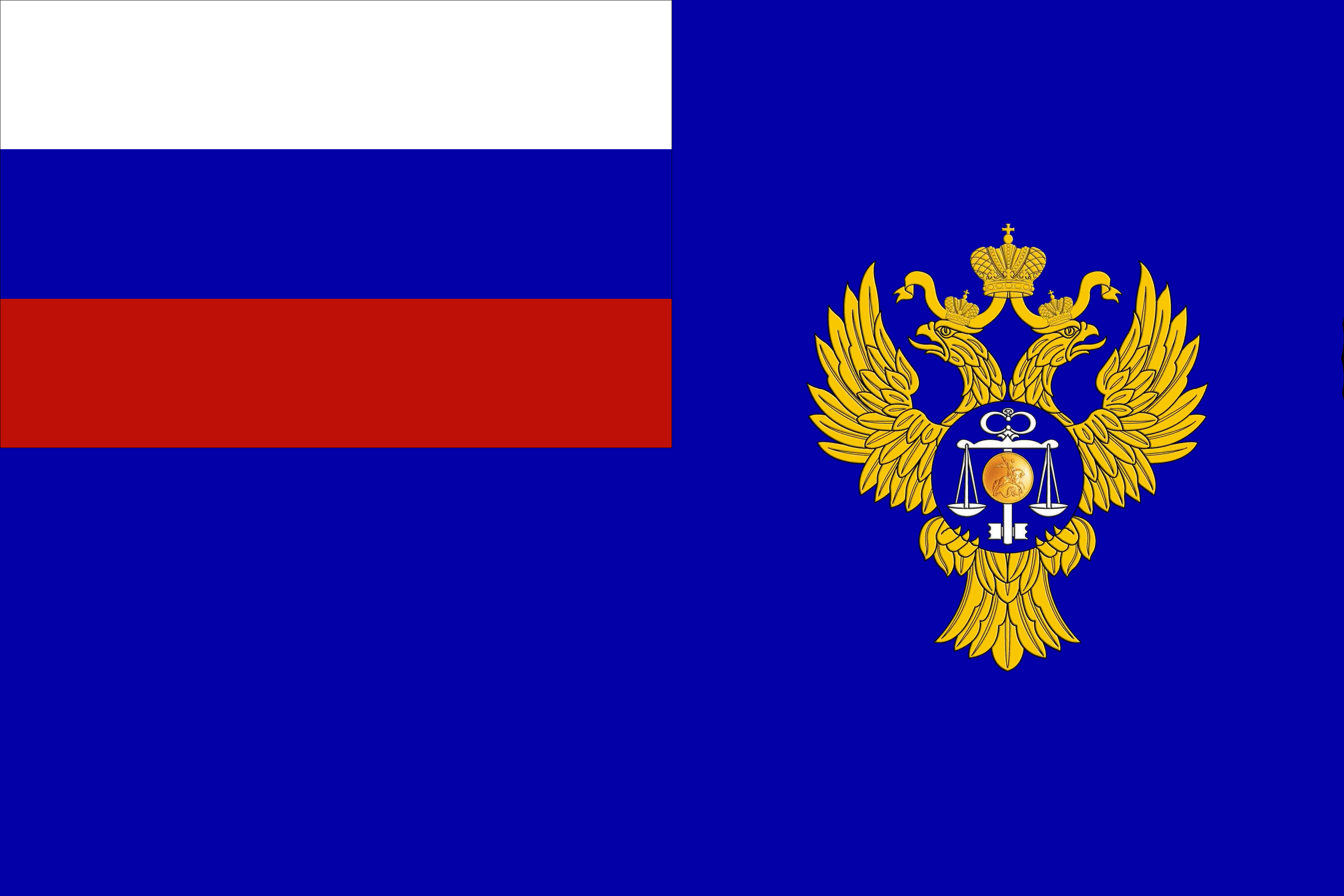
- Flag

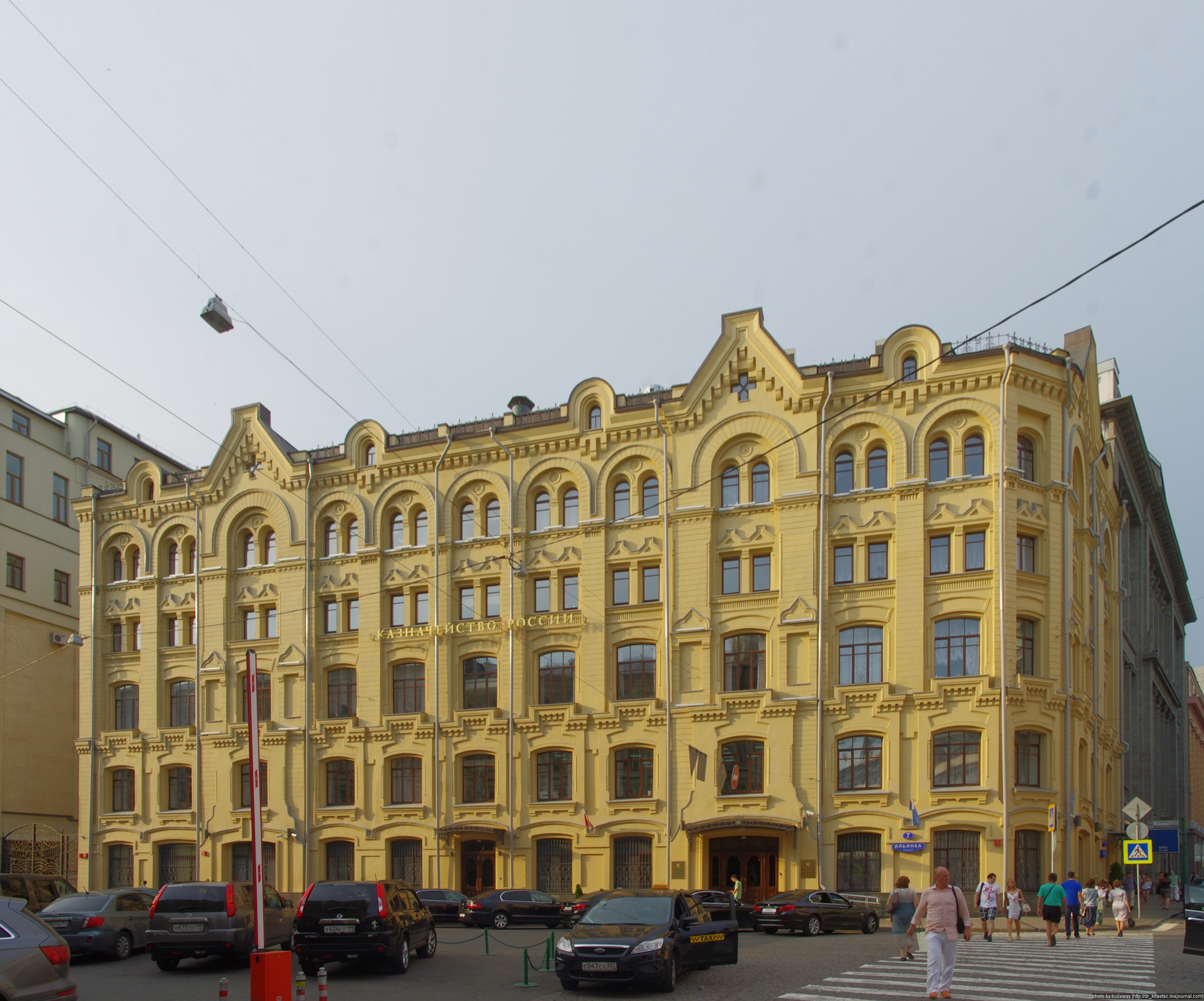
- Headquarters in Moscow

Agency overview
- Formed: December 8, 1992
- Jurisdiction: Government of Russia
- Headquarters: Ilyinka Street 7/3, Moscow; 55°45′19″N 37°37′32″E
- Agency executive: Roman Yevgenievich Artyukhin
- Parent agency: Ministry of Finance
- Website: roskazna.gov.ru

The Federal Treasury (Russian: Федеральное казначейство) is a federal executive body (federal service), which exercises enforcement functions to ensure the execution of the federal budget, cash servicing the execution of the budgets of the budget system of the Russian Federation, preliminary and current control over the conduct of operations with federal budget funds by the main administrators, managers and recipients of the federal budget. It was created pursuant decree of the President of the Russian Federation No. 1556 signed on December 8, 1992, and resolution of the Government of Russia of August 27, 1993 No. 864. The Regulation on the Federal Treasury was approved by Decree of the Government of the Russian Federation of December 1, 2004 No. 703 “On the Federal Treasury”. Starting January 1, 2005, the Federal Treasury was separated from the Ministry of Finance with conversion to a federal service subordinate to that ministry and managed by it. The Treasury's headquarters is in the Apartment building of Joseph Volokolamski Compound (Russian: Доходный дом Иосифо-Волоколамского подворья) in central Moscow.

== Tasks and responsibilities ==
Resolution of the Government of the Russian Federation of December 1, 2004 No. 703 assigns the following powers to the Federal Treasury:

communicates to the main administrators, administrators and recipients of the federal budget funds the indicators of the consolidated budget list, the limits of budgetary obligations and the amount of financing;

- Keeps records of cash execution of the federal budget;
- Opens accounts in the Central Bank of the Russian Federation and credit organizations for accounting for funds from the federal budget and other funds in accordance with the legislation of the Russian Federation, establishes the regimes of accounts of the federal budget;
- Opens and maintains personal accounts of chief administrators, administrators and recipients of federal budget funds;
- Maintains a consolidated register of the main administrators, administrators and recipients of the federal budget;
- Keeps track of indicators of the consolidated budget list of the federal budget, limits of budgetary obligations and their changes;
- Compiles and submits to the Ministry of Finance of the Russian Federation operational information and reports on the implementation of the federal budget, reports on the *Execution of the consolidated budget of the Russian Federation;
- Receives in the prescribed manner from the main managers of the federal budget, executive bodies of the constituent entities of the Russian Federation, state extra-budgetary funds and local governments the materials necessary for reporting on the implementation of the federal budget and the consolidated budget of the Russian Federation;
- Carries out the distribution of income from the payment of federal taxes and fees between the budgets of the budget system of the Russian Federation in accordance with the legislation of the Russian Federation;
- Carries out forecasting and cash planning of federal budget funds;
- Manages operations on a single account of the federal budget;
- Provides cash services for budget execution of the budget system of the Russian Federation in the established manner;
- Provides cash payments from the budgets of the budget system of the Russian Federation on behalf of and on behalf of the relevant bodies that collect budget revenues, or recipients of funds from these budgets, personal accounts of which are open in the established procedure at the Federal Treasury;

== See also ==
- Federal budget of Russia
- Economy of Russia
- Russian rouble
