= Tatyana Nesterenko =

Russian politician

- Татьяна Нестеренко
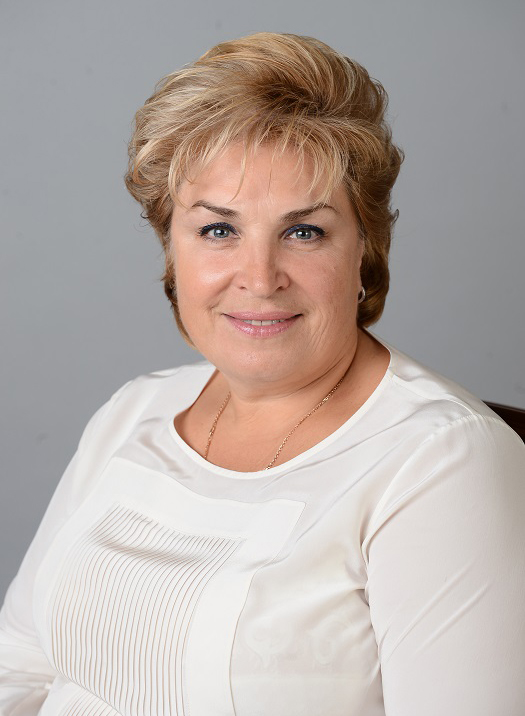

First Deputy Minister of Finance
- In office 5 October 2012 – 19 March 2021
- Prime Minister: Dmitry Medvedev; Mikhail Mishustin
- Minister: Anton Siluanov
- Preceded by: Office established
- Succeeded by: Office abolished

Deputy Minister of Finance
- In office 27 September 2007 – 5 October 2012
- Prime Minister: Viktor Zubkov (1st time); Vladimir Putin; Viktor Zubkov (2nd time); Dmitry Medvedev
- Minister: Aleksey Kudrin; Anton Siluanov

Head of the Federal Treasury
- In office 1 January 2005 – 27 September 2007
- Prime Minister: Mikhail Fradkov; Viktor Zubkov
- Minister: Aleksey Kudrin
- Preceded by: herself (as Director of the Department of Federal Treasury of the Ministry of Finance)
- Succeeded by: Roman Artyukhin

Deputy Minister of Finance — Head of the Main Directorate of Federal Treasury
- In office 12 January 1998 – 14 May 2004
- Prime Minister: Viktor Chernomyrdin; Sergey Kirienko; Viktor Chernomyrdin (acting); Yevgeny Primakov; Sergey Stepashin; Vladimir Putin; Mikhail Kasyanov; Viktor Khristenko (acting); Mikhail Fradkov
- Minister: Mikhail Zadornov; Mikhail Kasyanov; Aleksey Kudrin
- Preceded by: Aleksandr Smirnov
- Succeeded by: herself (as Director of the Department of Federal Treasury of the Ministry of Finance)

Member of the State Duma from Chukotka constituency of Chukotka AO
- In office 12 December 1993 – 12 January 1998
- Preceded by: Office established
- Succeeded by: Vladimir Babichev

Personal details
- Born: 5 August 1959 (age 67) Vladivostok, Primorsky Krai, Russian SFSR, Soviet Union
- Party: Independent
- Children: 2
- Education: Khabarovsk Institute of National Economy (1981)

Tatyana Gennadyevna Nesterenko (Russian: Татьяна Геннадьевна Нестеренко) (born 5 August 1959) is a Russian politician and stateswoman. Nesterenko led Federal Treasury for nine years (1998-2007) and in her position as First Deputy Minister of Finance in 2012-2021 was the highest-ranking woman in the Ministry. She has the federal state civilian service rank of 1st class Active State Councillor of the Russian Federation.

== Early life and career ==
Tatyana Nesterenko was born on 8 August 1959 in Vladivostok, Primorsky Krai.

In 1981 Nesterenko graduated Khabarovsk Institute of National Economy with a degree in "finance and credit". After graduation she was assigned to Chukotka Autonomous Okrug.

In Chukotka Nesterenko started working as an economist for revenue at the finance department of the Anadyrsky District Executive Committee. In 1984-1989 Nesterenko worked in the district finance department as revisor — inspector of budget and deputy chief — head of the budget inspection.

In 1989 Nesterenko was promoted to head of the finance department of the Chukotka Okrug Executive Committee.

In 1991 Chukotka Okrug Executive Committee was re-organised into Okrug Administration, which was led by Aleksandr Nazarov, appointed by President Yeltsin in November 1991. Nazarov picked Nesterenko to serve as his deputy in addition to her previous role as Head of the Okrug Finance Department.

== State Duma ==
In 1993 Tatyana Nesterenko ran for State Duma in the Chukotka constituency. Despite she was officially an independent, Nesterenko had the backing of Governor Nazarov and received an endorsement from the Choice of Russia. Nesterenko won the December election with just 25.50% of the vote, her nearest opponent — detective Yekaterina Nutanaun (Independent) — received 14.87%.

In the State Duma Nesterenko initially joined New Regional Politics deputies' group, created by independent deputies elected in single-mandate constituencies. Nesterenko also was appointed member of the Subcommittee on Budgetary System and Extrabudgetary Funds of the Committee on Budget, Taxes, Banks and Finance. On 7 April 1995 Nesternko left the NRP group and became unaffiliated deputy. During her work in the State Duma Nesterenko took active part in development of budgetary and taxation law, including the Budget Code of the Russian Federation.

Nesterenko ran for re-election in 1995 in the constituency. She faced a serious opponent in Federation Council member Maya Ettyryntyna (CPRF). Nevertheless, Nesterenko easily won the election with 42.17% (Ettyryntyna received 22.83%).

Tatyana Nesterenko joined Russian Regions deputies group in the State Duma, which mostly composed of former NRP members. Nesterenko retained her position as member of the Committee on Budget, Taxes, Banks and Finance.

== Federal Treasury ==
In November 1997 Chairman of the Duma Budget Committee Mikhail Zadornov (Yabloko) was appointed Minister of Finance in the Cabinet of Premier Chernomyrdin. After his appointment Zadornov considered firing Federal Treasury head Aleksandr Smirnov and replacing him with Zadornov's former Duma colleague Tatyana Nesterenko in December 1997. Zadornov succeeded in his plans and on 12 January 1998 appointed Nesterenko Deputy Minister of Finance — Head of the Main Directorate of the Federal Treasury.

Nesterenko served in this capacity until 2004, surviving 7 cabinet reshuffles and outlasting two Finance Ministers (Zadornov and Mikhail Kasyanov). Under Nesterenko the process of Federal Treasury structure formation was finalised and the Budget Code was adopted. In 2000 Nesterenko was rumoured to leave her position in the Ministry for auditor of the Accounts Chamber.

In May 2004 Main Directorate of Federal Treasury of the Ministry of Finance was transformed into Department of Federal Treasury in the Ministry. Nesterenko was appointed Director of the new department but lost her position as Deputy Minister.

In December 2004 the department was again transformed into Federal Treasury, an independent body subordinate to the Ministry of Finance. Tatyana Nesterenko served as Head of the Treasury until 2007. Under Nesterenko maximum coverage of federal budgetary funds by treasury procedures was achieved, complete treasury system was established, including treasury authorities in the Chechen Republic, Tatarstan and Bashkortostan.

In 2006 Nesterenko received Candidate of Economic Sciences degree after she defended her thesis "The Concept of Effective Budgetary Policy" in the Financial University under the Government of the Russian Federation.

== Deputy Minister of Finance ==
In late September 2007 Minister of Finance Aleksey Kudrin appointed Tatyana Nesterenko his deputy which forced her to leave the Federal Treasury. Deputy Head of the Treasury Roman Artyukhin was selected as her replacement. As Deputy Minister Nesterenko continued to oversee Federal Treasury and budgetary procedures.

On 26 September 2011 Minister Kudrin was asked to resign by President Dmitry Medvedev after the former criticised the latter after an IMF session in Washington. Kudrin agreed to resign and his deputy Anton Siluanov was appointed acting Minister of Finance. However, Siluanov was widely seen as a temporary figure and some viewed Nesterenko as potential Minister, especially after she was designated Ministry of Finance representative at the 28 September Cabinet meeting. Nevertheless, on 16 December Siluanov was confirmed as Minister of Finance, while Nesterenko retained her position as Deputy Minister.

Tatyana Nesterenko was promoted to First Deputy Minister of Finance on 5 October 2012. In her new capacity she oversaw budgetary revenues.

In 2013 Nesterenko was considered among possible candidates for Chair of the Accounts Chamber of Russia.

In 2014 Ogoniok magazine, Echo of Moscow radio station and Interfax news agency presented a joint ratings of 100 most powerful women in Russia. Nesterenko made into the list at 20th position.

In November 2020 newly appointed Premier Mikhail Mishustin announced an administrative reform aimed at optimisation of government structure. By January 2021 the reform was finalised, main part of it was that the number of deputy ministers was set at 10, including 1 first deputy minister. Ministry of Finance had 12 Deputy Minister, including 2 First Deputy Ministers, which forced Minister Siluanov to cut the number of deputies by 2. Both First Deputy Ministers Tatyana Nesterenko and Leonid Gornin declined to demote, which forced either of them to retire. On 19 March 2021 Nesterenko stepped down from her position of First Deputy Minister of Finance and left the Ministry.

On 21 April 2021 Nesterenko became Vice Chair of Otkrytie Bank Board, a deputy to her former boss Mikhail Zadornov, who chairs the board. In Otkrytie Nesterenko is responsible for government relations, including with the Government of Russia and the Central Bank of Russia.

Tatyana Nesterenko also chairs the Board of Trustees of Female Boarding School of the Ministry of Defense.

== Honours ==
- Order of Honour (2007)
- Order of Friendship (2012)
- Medal of the Order "For Merit to the Fatherland" II class (2001)
- Stolypin Medal (2021)
- Letter of Gratitude of the Government of Russia (2016)
- Letter of Gratitude of the President of Russia (2021)
- Honoured Economist of the Russian Federation (2004)
- Active State Advisor I class (2009)
