= Efim Malkin =

Russian politician (born 1954)

- Ефим Малкин
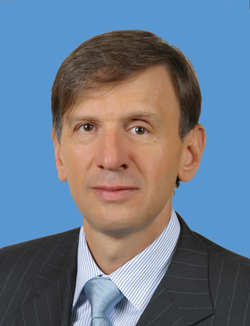
- Malkin in 2005

Senator from the Chukotka Autonomous Okrug
- In office 1 January 2002 – 1 June 2015
- Succeeded by: Aramas Dallakyan

Personal details
- Born: Efim Malkin; 9 July 1954 (age 72)
- Education: Military Engineering-Technical University

Efim Naumovich Malkin (Russian: Ефим Наумович Малкин; born 9 July 1954) is a Russian politician who served as a senator from the Chukotka Autonomous Okrug from 2002 to 2015.

== Career ==
Efim Malkin was born on 9 July 1954. Later, he graduated from the Military Engineering-Technical University. After that, he served in the Main Directorate of Special Construction of the Ministry of Defense, in the military space troops at the Baikonur Cosmodrome, and then at the Plesetsk Cosmodrome. In the 1990s, he served as the Head of the Consumer Relations Department at Sibneft.

From 2002 to 2015, he represented the Chukotka Autonomous Okrug in the Federation Council. In 2013, he was one of the 13 senators who did not vote for the Dima Yakovlev Law. In June 2015, he asked the Federation Council to deprive him of his post ahead of schedule.
