= Vladimir Babichev =

Russian politician (1939–2010)

- Владимир Бабичев
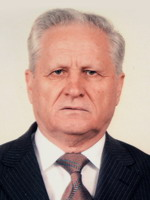
- Babichev in 2008

Russian Federation Senator from the Republic of Kalmykia
- In office 3 February 2010 – 15 December 2010
- Preceded by: Konstantin Tsitsin
- Succeeded by: Alexei Mayorov

Russian Federation Senator from Volgograd Oblast
- In office 27 December 2006 – 3 February 2010
- Preceded by: Dmitry Skarga
- Succeeded by: Nikolay Maksyuta

Ambassador of Russia to Kazakhstan
- In office 2 July 2003 – 9 November 2006
- Preceded by: Yury Merzlyakov
- Succeeded by: Mikhail Bocharnikov

Member of the State Duma from Chukotka constituency of Chukotka AO
- In office 31 May 1998 – 19 December 1999
- Preceded by: Tatyana Nesterenko
- Succeeded by: Roman Abramovich

Chief of Staff of the Government
- In office 15 November 1994 – 23 March 1998
- Prime Minister: Viktor Chernomyrdin
- Preceded by: Vladimir Kvasov
- Succeeded by: Yury Zubakov

People's Deputy of Russia
- In office 16 May 1990 – 4 October 1993

Personal details
- Born: 11 January 1939 Sadovoye, Sarpinsky District, Kalmyk ASSR, Russian SFSR, Soviet Union
- Died: 15 December 2010 (aged 71) Moscow, Russian Federation
- Party: Independent
- Other political affiliations: NDR (1995-2000); CPSS (1966-1991)
- Children: 2
- Education: Volgograd Institute of Urban Economy (1962); Correspondence Higher Party School (1973); Academy of Social Studies of the Central Committee of CPSS (1981)

Vladimir Stepanovich Babichev (Russian: Владимир Степанович Бабичев; 11 January 1939 – 15 December 2010) was a Soviet and Russian politician and former Chief of Staff of the Russian Government (1994–1998).

== Early life and career ==
Vladimir Babichev was born on 11 January 1939 in Sadovoye village in northern Kalmyk ASSR, near the border with Volgograd Oblast. Sarpinsky District of Kalmykia, where Sadovoye is located, is a Russian majority district.

In 1956-1957 Babichev worked in a kolkhoz.

In 1962 Babichev graduated Volgograd Institute of Urban Economy and received the degree of "construction engineer".

After graduation Babichev returned to Kalmykia and until 1963 worked as master and foreman of repair and construction management in Elista. In 1963 he was appointed Chief Engineer and Deputy Minister of Communal Utilities of Kalmyk ASSR. In 1964 Babichev became precinct chief of department "Promzhylstroy" but later worked as chief engineer mobile mechanised column and head of the department in "Kalmykstroy" trust.

== Communist Party of the Soviet Union ==
In 1966 Vladimir Babichev joined Communist Party of the Soviet Union and was its member until the party was banned in August 1991.

Babichev started his governmental career and became Deputy Chairman of the Elista City Executive Committee in 1966. In 1969-1974 Babichev worked as Minister of Communal Utilities of Kalmyk ASSR. In 1972 he graduated Correspondence Higher Party School of the Central Committee of CPSS.

Babichev was elevated to the position of Deputy Chairman of the Council of Ministers of Kalmykia in 1974. In 1977 Babichev became Secretary of the Kalmyk Regional Committee of CPSS.

In 1981 Vladimir Babichev graduated Academy of Social Studies of the Central Committee of CPSS, where he received Candidate of Historical Sciences degree. Babichev wrote a dissertation "Organisational Party Work Improvement under Concentration and Specialisation in Construction".

Later in 1981 Babichev was assigned to Astrakhan Oblast, where he served as secretary of the Astrakhan Oblast Committee of CPSS. There Babichev also met Viktor Chernomyrdin, at that time he was an instructor of heavy industry department of the Central Committee of CPSS and curated Astrakhan Gas Processing Plant's construction. In 1985 Babichev was promoted to the second secretary of the Oblast Committee.

In 1986 Vladimir Babichev was moved to the Central Committee of CPSS in Moscow, where he was an inspector of the Central Committee. In 1987-1989 Babichev was head of sector and deputy head of the department of party building and personnel management in the Central Committee of CPSS. Since 1989 Babichev was first deputy head of that department.

== People's Deputy of Russia ==
On 18 March 1990 Vladimir Babichev was elected people's deputy of RSFSR from Priyutnoye national-territorial constituency No.107 in western Kalmykia. Babichev was elected to the Soviet of Nationalities of the Supreme Soviet of RSFSR, where he was a member of the Commission on Social and Economic Development of Republics, Autonomous Oblasts, Autonomous Okrugs and Indigenous Small-Numbered People. Babichev was member of establishment communist Communists of Russia faction (June 1990, December 1992), military-aligned Fatherland faction (1991) and centrist Sovereignty and Equality faction (1992-1993), which united deputies from Russian autonomies.

Due to Babichev's election as people's deputy he was appointed Head of the Department of Legislative Initiatives and Legal Issues of the Central Committee of CPSS. At the XXVIII Congress of CPSS in July 1990 Babichev was elected Member of the Central Committee of CPSS.

At the I Congress of People's Deputies of Russian SFSR (22 June 1990) Vladimir Babichev attacked newly-elected Chairman of the Supreme Soviet Boris Yeltsin and offered him to nominate Aleksandr Vlasov, Yeltin's opponent in chairmanship election, for Chairman of the Council of Ministers of RSFSR in order to "unite the divided Congress". Yeltsin rebuked Babichev for non-compliance with ethic culture and declined to nominate Vlasov, as the former proposed 3 candidacies for Chairman of the Council of Ministers (Vice Chairman Ivan Silayev, Moscow Aviation Institute rector Yury Ryzhov and president of BUTEK conglomerate Mikhail Bocharov). Babichev also voted against Yeltsin's proposal to depoliticise army and law enforcement (disband CPSS organisations there).

At the II Congress of People's Deputies (27 November — 15 December 1990) Babichev voted against the establishment of President of Russian SFSR position.

After the August 1991 coup attempt Communist Party of the Soviet Union was banned by Yeltsin's decree, thus leaving Babichev without a full-time job in the party's Central Committee.

In September 1991 Vladimir Babichev received the job as deputy general director of Gazmash factory, a subsidiary of Gazprom, led by Viktor Chernomyrdin.

== Chief of Staff of the Government ==
In June 1994 President Boris Yeltsin at a press conference expressed his displeasure with Apparatus of the Government of Russia activity and demanded Viktor Chernomyrdin to make personnel rearrangements in the Apparatus. On 14 November 1994 Chernomyrdin unexpectedly fired his Chief of Staff Vladimir Kvasov and replaced him with Vladimir Babichev.

During his service as Chief of Staff Babichev was widely regarded as an éminence grise due to his close relations with Chernomyrdin during their work in the Central Committee of CPSS and Gazprom. Babichev also had ties with former nomeklatura and newly-reformed Communist Party.

Since January 1995 Babichev was member of the Presidential Council for Personnel Policy. In June 1995 Babichev gave an interview to Obshchaya Gazeta, where he claimed that he never was in opposition to Boris Yeltsin rather he disliked Yeltin's circle.

In April 1995 President Yeltsin announced that he had ordered Premier Chernomyrdin and State Duma Speaker Ivan Rybkin to create two political blocs — the centre-right one and the centre-left, with Chernomyrdin due to lead the former. That same month an organising committee of Our Home – Russia bloc (NDR) was created with 49 members, among whom was Vladimir Babichev. Babichev's involvement in NDR parliamentary campaign was reported to be negative as he forced out the bloc's initial campaign manager Aleksey Golovkov. Despite Our Home's bleak results in the general election (10% of popular vote and 2nd place overall), in February 1996 Vladimir Babichev was appointed Chairman of the bloc's Executive Committee and in April 1996 he was elected Vice Chairman of the Our Home – Russia Movement. In this position Babichev was tasked to manage Boris Yeltsin's re-election campaign. In July 1996 Yeltsin defeated Gennady Zyuganov (CPRF) in a runoff, winning a second term. Babichev received a gratitude form the President as an active member of the campaign.

In late July 1996 rumours floated that Yeltsin's aide Viktor Ilyushin would join the Government, replacing Babichev as Chief of Staff. After the presidential election the Government was due to be re-organised and Babichev submitted his own project. Babichev's project proposed to employ 20 federal ministers-politicians, who oversaw several sectoral ministries led by lower-tier ministers-professionals. Babichev's plan became a baseline for a new governmental structure, which was finalised in August 1996. In the new Cabinet Babichev retained his position as Chief of Staff but also was elevated to Deputy Prime Minister. Ilyushin also joined the Cabinet as First Deputy Prime Minister for Social Policy.

In September 1996 tensions escalated between Babichev and NDR State Duma faction leader Sergey Belyaev. The reason of heightened tensions was that all strategic plans of NDR re-organisation into a political party were made in NDR Executive Committee without consultations with the NDR faction. Belyaev claimed that the State Duma faction is a political core of NDR and the Executive Committee should only have back-office functions. The continued power struggle resulted in Babichev's victory and Belyaev leaving NDR faction in September 1997.

On 26 October 1996 Babichev was appointed Co-Chairman of the Intergovernmental Commissions between Russian Federation and Slovakia and the Czech Republic for Trade and Economic, Scientific and Technological Cooperation.

On 17 March 1997 Russian Government was reshuffled and 4 positions of Deputy Prime Minister were slashed. Vladimir Babichev remained Chief of Staff but was demoted from Deputy Prime Minister to just Minister. Many high-tier governmental officials were sacked, including First Deputy Prime Ministers Aleksey Bolshakov (Industry, Transport and Communications), Viktor Ilyushin (Social Policy) and Vladimir Potanin (Economy), Deputy Prime Ministers Oleg Davydov (Foreign Economic Relations), Aleksandr Zaveryukha (Agriculture), Vitaly Ignatenko (Mass Communications), Aleksandr Livshits (Finance), Oleg Lobov (Transport, Communications and Construction) and Vladimir Fortov (Science). During 1997 future State Duma member Elmira Glubokovskaya worked in Babichev's office as deputy chief of his secretariat.

On 23 March 1998 Boris Yeltsin dismissed Viktor Chernomyrdin from the position of Prime Minister and replaced him with Sergey Kirienko. As the result nearly everyone in Chernomydrin's Cabinet were also ousted, including Babichev, who was replaced with Nikolay Khvatkov.

== Later life and death ==
After leaving Russian Government Vladimir Babichev was appointed First Deputy Chairman of the NDR Political Committee (former Premier Chernomyrdin was elected Chairman) in April 1998.

In May 1998 Babichev decided to run for State Duma in the Chukotka constituency by-election. The seat became vacant after incumbent deputy Tatyana Nesterenko was appointed Deputy Minister of Finance in January 1998. During the campaign Babichev received the support of Governor Aleksandr Nazarov. Babichev overwhelmingly won the by-election with 54.88% of the vote, his nearest opponent, NPSR-endorsed Vladimir Yetylin, received 20.08%. In the State Duma Babichev joined Our Home – Russia faction and was appointed to the Committee on Federation and Regional Policy. Babichev initially explored a run for a full term in the Chukotka constituency, holding meetings with constituents, but later ruled out running in the constituency after Governor Nazarov supported billionaire Roman Abramovich. In April 1999 Vladimir Babichev was replaced in the position of Chairman of the NDR Executive Committee with Yevgeny Trofimov, however, Babichev retained his membership in the Presidium of the Political Council. Babichev did not run for re-election for State Duma and retired at the end of his term in December 1999.

After leaving Stat Duma Babichev became advisor to Chief of Staff of the Government Igor Shuvalov in June 2000.

In June 2003 longtime career diplomat Yury Merzlyakov announced his pending resignation from the position of Russian Ambassador to Kazakhstan, which he held since 1999. On 20 June Vladimir Babichev was announced as next ambassador after Merzlyakov's meeting with President Nursultan Nazarbayev.

In November 2006 Volgograd Oblast Governor Nikolay Maksyuta announced that he would appoint former Chairman of Roszdrav (Note: Federal Agency for Health and Social Development) Vyacheslav Prokhorov to the Federation Council and introduced his candidacy to the Volgograd Oblast Duma. However, Office of the Prosucutor General opened a case against Prokhorov and his candidacy had to be withdrawn (Prokhorov was later sentenced for negligence). So in December Maksyuta proposed the candidacy of Babichev, citing his extensive governmental work and close relations between the politicians. Oblast Duma confirmed Babichev as Member of the Federation Council and he took office on 27 December. In the Federation Council Babichev joined the Committee on Commonwealth of Independent States Relations and since March 2008 he was its Deputy Chairman. Since March 2007 Babichev also was member of the Commission on Liaison with Accounts Chamber and the Commission on Natural Monopolies. In December 2009 Maksyuta's gubernatorial term expired, he was not renominated and was replaced with Anatoly Brovko. Brovko intended to appoint former Governor to Babichev's seat in the Federation Council but the appointment was delayed due to Federation Council Speaker Sergey Mironov's intent to keep Babichev in office. However, on 21 January 2010 Volgograd Oblast Duma confirmed Maksyuta as Volgograd Oblast Senator.

Vladimir Babichev did not leave the Federation Council but rather was re-appointed by another region — his native Republic of Kalmykia. His was elected by the People's Khural of Kalmykia unanimously on 1 February 2010. Babichev already had a reputation of Kalmykia President Kirsan Ilyumzhinov lobbyist on federal level. In the Federation Council Babichev retained all his positions.

On the night of 15 December 2010 Vladimir Babichev died in Moscow after suffering a heart attack. He was 71 at the time of his death.

== Honours ==
- Order "For Merit to the Fatherland" IV class (2006)
- Order of the Red Banner of Labour
- Order Dostyq 2 class
- Medal "For Labour Valour"
- Medal "Federation Council. 15th Anniversary"
- Decoration For Impeccable Service XXX years (2001)
- Letter of Gratitude of the President of Russia (1996) (for active participation in 1996 Presidential campaign organisation)
- Letter of Gratitude of the President of Russia (1998) (for conscientious work and consistent implementation of economic reforms)
- Letter of Gratitude of the President of Russia (2005) (for service in implementation of foreign policy of the Russian Federation)
- Ambassador Extraordinary and Plenipotentiary (20 August 2004)
