= Yuri Merzlyakov =

Soviet-Russian diplomat (born 1949)

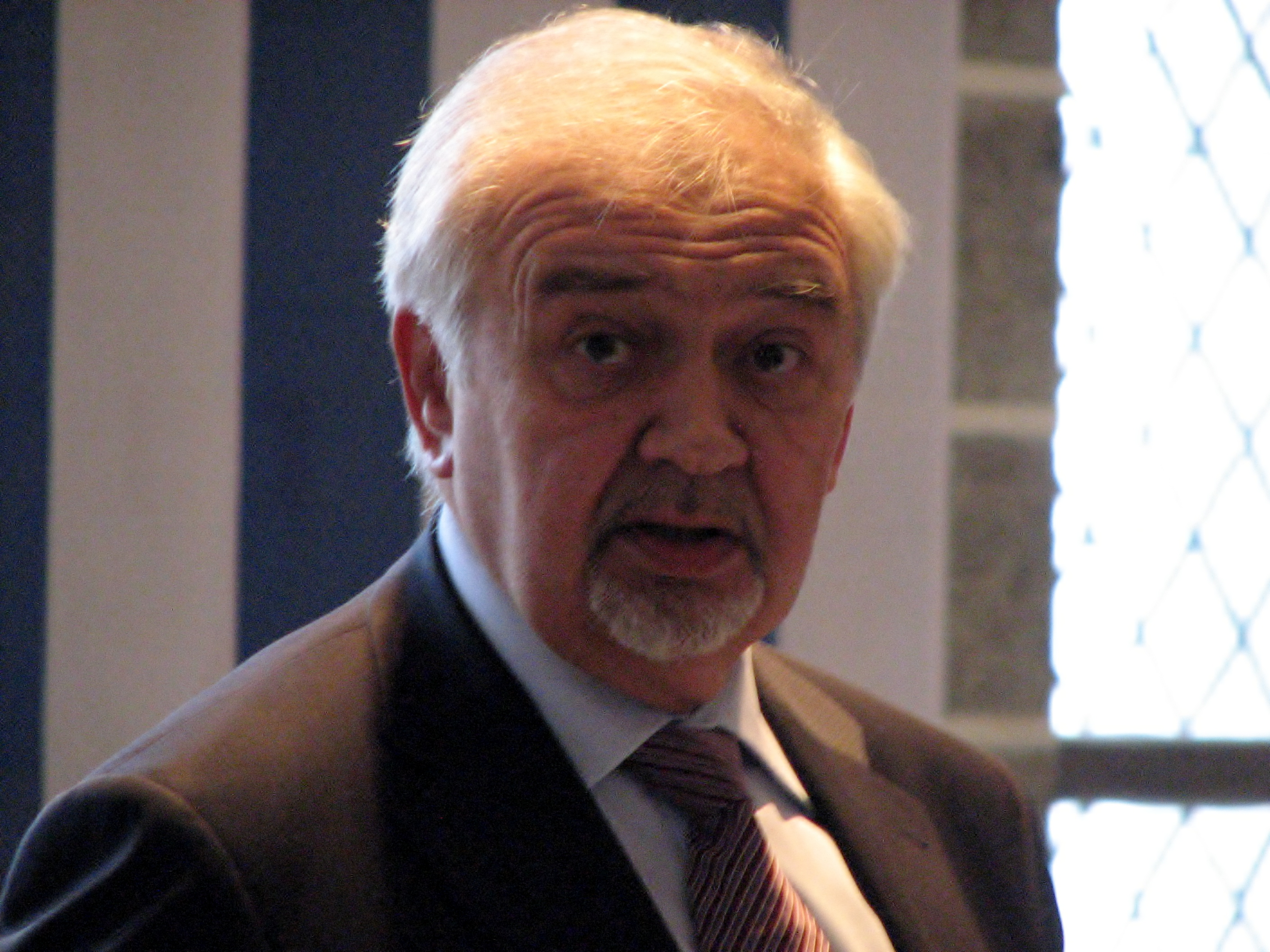
Merzlyakov in 2012

Yuri Nikolayevich Merzlyakov (Russian: Юрий Николаевич Мерзляков; born 9 April 1949) is a Russian diplomat, who was one of the 3 co-chairmen of the OSCE Minsk Group.

Yuri Merzlyakov graduated from MGIMO in 1971 and Diplomatic Academy of the USSR Ministry of Foreign Affairs in 1979, and worked at various positions in the central offices of the Soviet and Russian Ministries of Foreign Affairs and diplomatic missions abroad. In 1998-1999 he held the position of the special envoy at the Russian Ministry of Foreign Affairs and the head of the Working Group on the Caspian Sea.

Yuri Merzlyakov has a rank of the 1st class Ambassador Extraordinary and Plenipotentiary, speaks English, French and Swahili. He is married and has a daughter.

Yuri Merzlyakov was appointed on 19 July 2010 by the Russian President Dimitri Medvedev as the new Russian ambassador to Estonia, replacing his colleague Nikolai Uspensky. He served until 18 August 2015, when he was succeeded by Aleksandr Petrov.

Diplomatic posts
Preceded by Yuri Sepelyov	Ambassador of Russia to Madagascar and the Comoros; 1993–1997	Succeeded by Aleksandr Makarenko
Preceded by Valery Nikolayenko	Ambassador of Russia to Kazakhstan; 1999–2003	Succeeded by Vladimir Babichev
Preceded by Nikolai Uspensky	Ambassador of Russia to Estonia; 2010–2015	Succeeded by Mikhail Petrov
