= Anastasia Zhukova =

Russian politician (born 1974)

- Анастасия Жукова
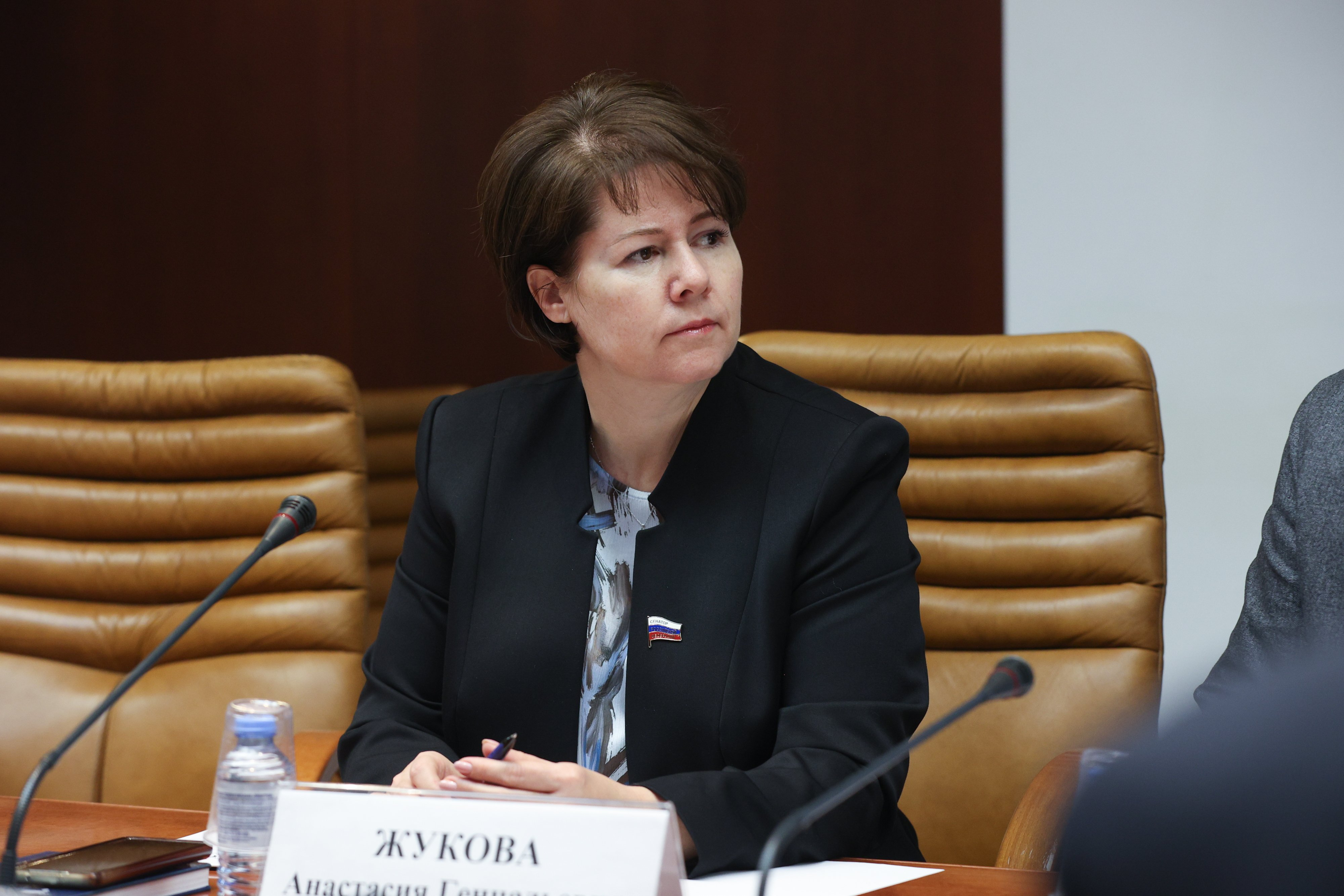
- Zhukova in 2023

Russian Federation Senator from the Chukotka Autonomous Okrug
- Incumbent
- Assumed office 1 October 2021
- Preceded by: Aramas Dallakyan

Personal details
- Born: Anastasia Gennadyevna Zhukova; 8 November 1974 (age 51) Novgorod, Soviet Union
- Party: United Russia

Anastasia Gennadyevna Zhukova (Russian: Anastasia Gennadyevna Zhukova; born 8 November 1974) is a Russian politician, who has been a member of the Federation Council for the legislative authority of Chukotka Autonomous Okrug since 1 October 2021.

She is also the Representative of the Federation Council under the President of the Russian Federation for Children's Rights (since October 11, 2023).

== Biography ==
Anastasia Zhukova was born on 8 November 1974 in Novgorod.

In 1997, she graduated from the Novgorod State Agricultural Academy (NGSA) and started working in the organizational department of the office of the governor and government of the Chukotka Autonomous Okrug.

In 1998, she graduated from the Saint Petersburg College of Economics, from 2002 to 2003 she simultaneously worked in the Anadyr branch of the Moscow Business World Bank and headed a department in the Department of Industrial and Agricultural Policy of Chukotka. Then until 2012, she managed the Chukotka branch of the Pension Fund of the Russian Federation. Since 2012, she was responsible for the social policy of the region as deputy and first deputy governor.

In 2016, she was appointed regional commissioner for human rights and acting commissioner for children's rights.

In 2021, Zhukova was elected from United Russia to the Duma of Chukotka Autonomous Okrug and on 1 October, she was empowered as a member of the Federation Council - a representative of the legislative authority of Chukotka Autonomous Okrug.

=== Sanctions ===
Since 9 March 2022, she has been under personal EU sanctions. She was sanctioned by the UK government on 15 March 2022 due to her support for the violation of Ukraine's territorial integrity during the Russo-Ukrainian War.
