= List of ambassadors of Russia to Seychelles =

Ambassador of the Russian Federation to the Republic of Seychelles
- Emblem of the Russian Foreign Ministry
- Incumbent; Artyom Kozhin since 15 January 2020
- Ministry of Foreign Affairs; Embassy of Russia in Victoria
- Style: His Excellency; The Honourable
- Reports to: Minister of Foreign Affairs
- Seat: Victoria
- Appointer: President of Russia
- Term length: At the pleasure of the president
- Website: Embassy of Russia in Seychelles

The ambassador extraordinary and plenipotentiary of the Russian Federation to the Republic of Seychelles is the official representative of the president and the government of the Russian Federation to the president and the government of Seychelles.

The ambassador and his staff work at large in the Embassy of Russia in Victoria. The post of Russian ambassador to Seychelles is currently held by Artyom Kozhin, incumbent since 15 January 2020.

== History of diplomatic relations ==
Diplomatic relations at the mission level between the Soviet Union and Seychelles were first established on 30 June 1976. The first ambassador, Aleksandr Startsev, was appointed on 4 April 1977, and presented his credentials on 27 June 1977. With the dissolution of the Soviet Union in 1991, the Soviet ambassador, Sergey Kiselyov, continued as representative of the Russian Federation until 1995.

== List of representatives (1977–present) ==
=== Soviet Union to Seychelles (1977–1991) ===
Name	Title	Appointment	Termination	Notes
Aleksandr Startsev	Ambassador	4 April 1977	10 August 1981	
Mikhail Orlov	Ambassador	10 August 1981	10 April 1987	
Viktor Anisimov	Ambassador	10 April 1987	20 February 1991	
Sergey Kiselyov	Ambassador	20 February 1991	25 December 1991	

=== Russian Federation to Seychelles (1991–present) ===
Name	Title	Appointment	Termination	Notes
Sergey Kiselyov	Ambassador	26 December 1991	7 September 1995	
Gennady Fedosov	Ambassador	7 September 1995	29 June 1998	
Vladimir Kalinin	Ambassador	29 June 1998	28 February 2005	
Aleksandr Vladimirov	Ambassador	28 February 2005	16 January 2009	
Mikhail Kalinin	Ambassador	16 January 2009	7 November 2012	
Vladimir Belous	Ambassador	27 August 2013	15 January 2020	
Artyom Kozhin	Ambassador	15 January 2020		
