= Duma of the Chukotka Autonomous Okrug =

Regional parliament of Chukotka Autonomous Okrug, Russia

Duma of the Chukotka Autonomous Okrug Дума Чукотского автономного округа
- 7th legislature

Type
- Type: Unicameral

Leadership
- Chairman: Alexander Maslov, United Russia since 30 September 2016

Structure
- Seats: 15
- Political groups: United Russia (11); CPRF (1); LDPR (1); SRZP (1); Independent (1)
- Length of term: 5 years

Elections
- Voting system: Mixed
- First election: 1994
- Last election: 19 September 2021
- Next election: 2026

Meeting place
- 29 Otke Street, Anadyr

Website
- dumachukotki.ru

The Duma of the Chukotka Autonomous Okrug (Russian: Дума Чукотского автономного округа) is the regional parliament of the Chukotka Autonomous Okrug, a federal subject of Russia in the far east of the country. Together with the executive and judicial branches, the okrug's duma (assembly) is vested with power to control the okrug's own affairs with high levels of autonomy from Moscow. All members are elected by public vote and are titled as deputies. Deputies currently have a five-year term.

== History ==
Prior to the dissolution of the Soviet Union, the Supreme Soviet of RSFSR (Russian Soviet Federative Socialist Republic) was the legislative body of the Soviet Union that was elected by members of the Congress of People's Deputies of Russia. The Supreme Soviet contained the Council of the Republic and the Council of Nationalities, which represented the population size of the federal subjects. Until 1990, Chukotka was administrated under Magadan Oblast, but a law passed that year allowed this arrangement to be altered. Chukotka declared its administrative independence from Magadan Oblast to join the Russian Federation as an autonomous okrug.

During the Russian constitutional crisis of 1993, the legislative body of Russia was dissolved and power was decentralized to the individual federal subjects by a presidential decree (No. 1617). Due to this, on 11 January 1994, another new decree was established to name the new local legislative body in Chukotka as the Duma of Chukotka Autonomous Okrug. Initially, the body had two chambers: an upper house with nine deputies, and a lower house with six deputies. The first legislative election was scheduled for 10 April 1994 to elect deputies for two-year terms.

Of Russia's 85 federal subjects, the Chukotka Autonomous Okrug ranks seventh by land area and 84th by population; it also is the least-densely populated (as of 2010 census). Approximately half of its population are Chukchis or other indigenous peoples.

== Structure ==
The Chukotka Autonomous Okrug Duma is unicameral, like most legislative assembly bodies of Russian federal subjects. It currently comprises 15 deputies, with 6 of them running in multi-seat constituencies and the other 9 in single electoral districts. Deputies are elected every 5 years by public vote, in which winners are determined by a combination of first-past-the-post voting and party-list proportional representation, in what is known as the parallel voting system. The duma also internally elects a legislative representative to the Federation Council, which is the upper house of Russia's legislative branch.

The executive branch of Chukotka works closely with the duma. The executive branch is also known as the government of Chukotka and is headed by the governor, who is the highest-ranking person in the okrug. The governor is not to be confused with the chairman of the duma, who is head of the duma only and chosen from amongst the deputies.

== Elections ==
=== 2021 ===
Party	%	Seats
United Russia	44.86	11
Liberal Democratic Party of Russia	22.20	1
Communist Party of the Russian Federation	15.91	1
A Just Russia — For Truth	12.26	1
Self-nominated	—	1
Registered voters/turnout	57.80	

== List of chairmen ==
No.	Name	Period		Party
1	Sergey Aleksandrovich Povodyr	1994	1997	Independent
2	Vasilii Nikolaevich Nazarenko	1997	2008	Independent
3	Roman Arkadyevich Abramovich	2008	2013	Independent
4	Dallakyan Aramais Dzhaganovich	2013	2015	United Russia
5	Valentina Vasilyevna Rudchenko	2015	2016	United Russia
6	Alexander Ivanovich Maslov	2016	—	United Russia

== Previous legislative assemblies ==
Convocation	Results and development
I; 1994–1997	The first election on 10 April 1994 resulted in the election of 13 deputies, split between 7 single-mandate constituencies and 2 three-mandate constituencies. They were elected for terms of 2 years, but because the election coincided with the election of the governor their terms were extended to 19 January 1997 (almost three years). Sergey Povodyr, the first duma chairman, was chosen by the deputies among themselves. The deputies adopted a number of laws in relation to the budget, finance, and taxes. They also started work on the development of the Charter of the Chukotka Autonomous Okrug, which describes the basic law of the okrug. As a result, the duma of the first convocation adopted about 100 decisions.
II; 1997–2001	In the second election on 22 December 1996, 13 deputies were elected. Its first session opened on 19 January 1997 and Vasilii Nazarenko was chosen as chairman by a majority vote of the deputies.
III; 2001–2005	The third convocation was elected to serve from 2001 until December 2005. Its first session opened on 16 January 2001, and Vasilii Nazarenko was re-elected as chairman.
IV; 2006–2010	In the election for the fourth convocation on 25 December 2005, 35 deputies were elected via party-list proportional representation. The first session was opened on 20 January 2006, and Vasilii Nazarenko was again re-elected as chairman. A constitutional amendment extended the term of the deputies from 4 to 5 years, to come into effect from the following election. As many as 786 laws were passed, more than all the laws passed in the previous three convocations; most of these related to the social condition of Chukotka, to benefit pensioners and low-income citizens. In 2008, Roman Abramovich was elected chairman after he had stepped down from his position as governor.
V; 2011–2016	The election for the fifth convocation was held on 13 March 2011, for which the terms of the deputies would end in March 2016. 12 deputies were elected. Abramovich resigned as chairman in 2013 and Dallakyan Aramais was elected to succeed him. In 2015, Valentina Rudchenko was elected chair.
VI; 2016–2021	United Russia (10) Communist Party (2) Liberal Democratic Party (2) A Just Russia (1) The election for the sixth convocation was held on 18 September 2016. Its first session opened on 30 September. The number of deputies had increased, from 12 to 15, and Maslov Ivanovich was elected chairman.
