= Alexander Zhukov =

Alexander Zhukov may refer to:

- Alexander Zhukov (politician, born 1956), Russian economist and politician, deputy chairman of the State Duma
- Alexander Zhukov (politician, born 1974), Russian politician, senator from Khakassia
- Alexander Zhukov (businessman) (born 1954), Russian-born British businessman
