= Ross J. Connelly =

American business executive

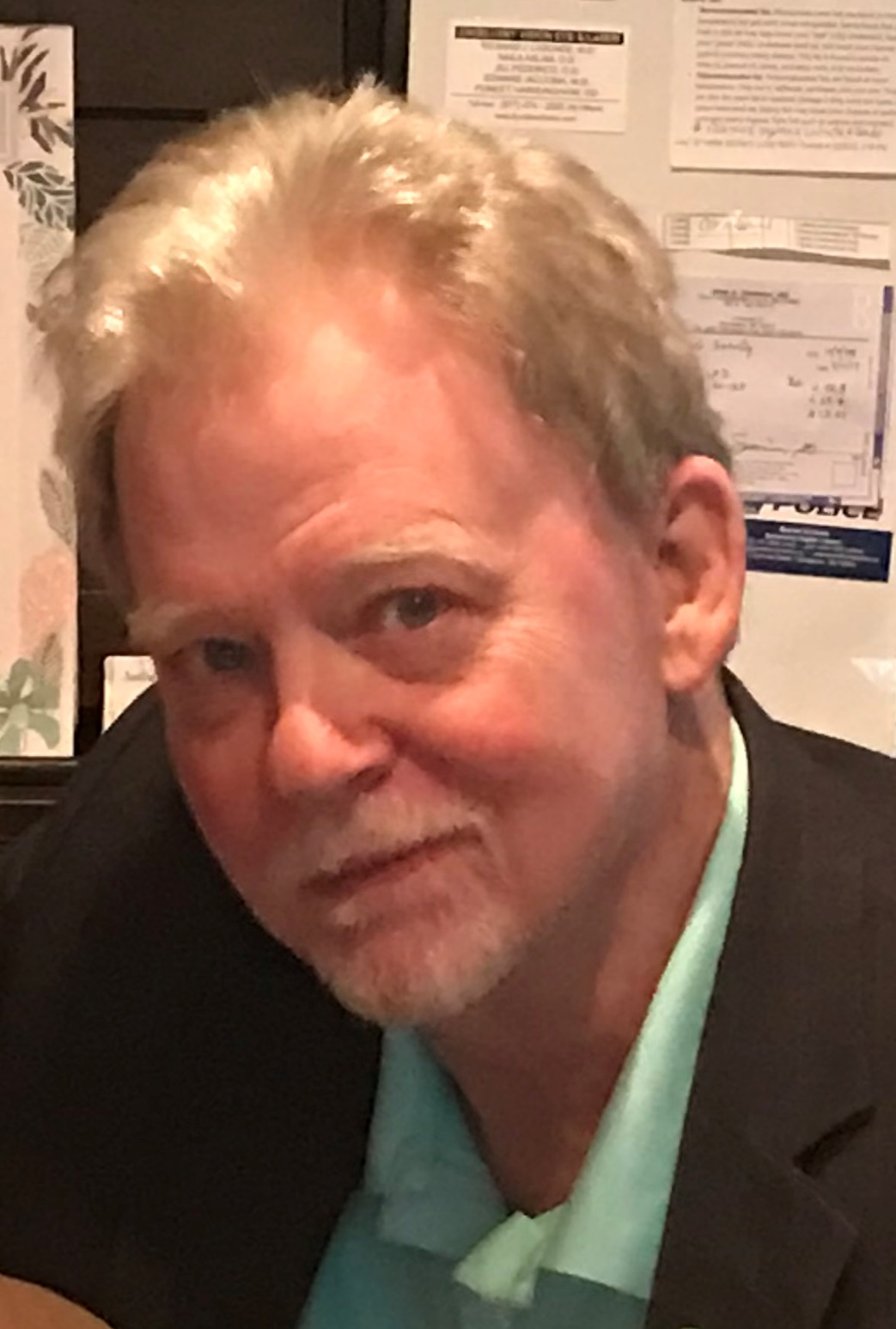
- Born: April 25, 1952
- Education: Duke University (BA), Georgetown University (Edmund A. Walsh School of Foreign Service MA)
- Occupation: Business executive
- Years active: 1977–present
- Employer: Akkadian Private Ventures (Managing Director)
- Known for: Former Executive Vice President and COO of Overseas Private Investment Corporation
- Notable work: Investments in energy, infrastructure, and private equity
- Political party: Republican

Ross J. Connelly (born April 25, 1952) is the former executive vice president and COO of the Overseas Private Investment Corporation. Connelly currently serves as Managing Director of Akkadian private Ventures which mobilizes U.S. investment and businesses projects across South America, the Middle East and Asia. Prior to OPIC, Connelly worked for Bechtel Corporation, where he was an executive (1977) and later a senior principal with Bechtel Investments (1982 - 1991) (which later became the Fremont Group) and the president of Bechtel Energy Resources, Inc. (1991 - 1993). In 1993, Connelly was elected President of Northgas, a Bechtel joint-venture dedicated to developing natural gas resources in northern Russia. He held this position until he left Bechtel in 1995.

== Education ==
Connelly earned his bachelor's degree of Political Science in 1974 from Duke University and his master's degree in Foreign Service - specializing in international trade and finance - from Georgetown University's Edmund A. Walsh School of Foreign Service in 1977.

== Biography ==
In 1998, Connelly ran for Maine's first district House of Representatives seat on the Republican ticket and lost to fellow Republican James Longley. In 2000, Connelly directed the Maine branch of George W. Bush's presidential campaign. In October 2001, Bush rewarded Connelly by appointing him to serve on the board of OPIC, the government office that provides political insurance to U.S. companies who want to invest in unstable parts of the world.

Since his appointment to the OPIC board, Connelly has traveled to Afghanistan, Russia, Azerbaijan, Serbia, Peru, and the Middle East to promote U.S. overseas investments, in particular the investments of U.S. companies (including Bechtel) in the privatization of foreign oil, power, water, and transportation infrastructures.

Connelly has attracted criticism for his role in OPIC projects and investments which critics say will directly benefit his former employers. In his tenure at OPIC, Connelly finalized OPIC's $130 million loan to Lima Airport Partners, a joint venture between Bechtel to privatize Jorge Chávez International Airport in Lima. He has also been involved in OPIC's investments in Serbia, a country where Bechtel has been awarded large highway building contracts.
