= Farkhad Akhmedov =

Russian-Azerbaijani businessman and politician

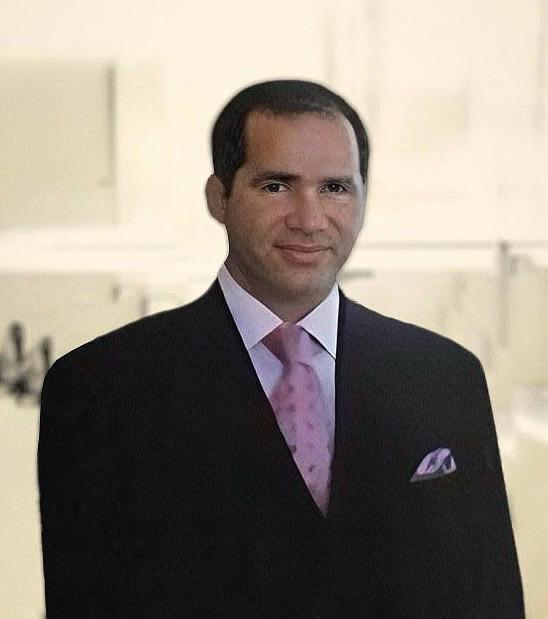

Russian Federation Senator from Krasnodar Krai
- In office December 8, 2004 – June 6, 2007
- Preceded by: Leonid Mostovoy
- Succeeded by: Alexander Pochinok

Russian Federation Senator from Nenets Autonomous Okrug
- In office June 6, 2007 – July 18, 2009
- Preceded by: Tatyana Konovalova
- Succeeded by: Alexey Panteleev

Personal details
- Born: Farkhad Teimurovich Akhmedov; 15 September 1955 (age 71) Baku, Azerbaijan SSR, Soviet Union
- Education: Moscow Veterinary Academy; Gubkin Russian State University of Oil and Gas

Farkhad Teimurovich Akhmedov (Azerbaijani: Fərhad Teymur oğlu Əhmədov, Russian: Фархад Теймурович Ахмедов; born 15 September 1955) is an Azerbaijani-Russian businessman and a former politician in Russia, departing his role in 2009. He is a former representative in the Federation Council of the Russian Federation.

== Early life and education ==
Akhmedov was born in Baku, ASSR. He was raised in Goychay located in the central region of Azerbaijan, where his father worked. He graduated from high school there in 1971.

Akhmedov left Azerbaijan in 1971, at the age of 15, and moved to Moscow. In Moscow, he entered Vocational Technical School No. 85 (assembling fitter) before being drafted for military service, serving from 1975 to 1977 in the Navy as a senior sergeant and platoon commander.

At the end of his service, on the recommendations of his naval commanders, he submitted an application for admission to the Moscow State Institute of International Relations (MGIMO) but was turned down, because of his father's conviction. In 1978, Akhmedov entered the Moscow Veterinary Academy named after K.I. Skryabin, graduating on an extramural basis in 1983 with a degree in Technology and Merchandising Process of Fur Products.

== Business career ==
From 1986 to 1994, Akhmedov lived in London, initially engaging in the sale of furs in international markets. Later, he founded and headed the Tansley Trading company specialising in the supply of equipment for the oil and gas industry of the USSR and also traded in oil and oil products.

=== Northgas ===
In 1995, Akhmedov concentrated on business in Russia. He bought a minority stake in Northgas from Bechtel, an American construction company. He headed the Board of Directors of the FARCO Securities investment company (1995 - 1998) and entered the Board of Directors of Northgas Closed Joint Stock Company (1994-2001).

He headed the Board of Directors of Northgas, CJSC in 2002. Under his leadership the company moved into long term profitability.

In 2005, threatened with the loss of his license to produce gas by the Russian state, Akhmedov agreed to give Gazprom 51% of his shares, in return for not pursuing any claims against Akhmedov. In 2012, Akhmedov sold his 49% stake in Northgas to Novatek for $1.375 billion. Earlier that year, Akhmedov had threatened to sue Gazprom in the London Court of International Arbitration for failing to abide by the 2005 settlement agreement signed by Akhmedov and the then-CEO of Gazprom, now Prime Minister of Russia Dmitry Medvedev, by increasing tariffs on gas production and reducing the quotas which Northgas was permitted to produce.

=== Azerbaijan ===
At the turn of the 1990s, he took part in international negotiations on the development of deep-water oil and gas fields in the Caspian Sea basin. Using previously established contacts, he helped to attract American oil companies, Amoco Eurasia Petroleum Corporation and McDermott International to the project. He was involved in an agreement signed in Baku on 20 September 1994 between the newly independent Azerbaijan and an international consortium of oil companies on the development of Caspian energy resources.

According to Akhmedov's memoirs, these negotiations, which began before the collapse of the USSR, presented political, organisational and technical challenges. The team which helped bring them to a successful conclusion included Natik Aliyev and Khoshbakht Yusifzade who later became Heads of the State Oil Company of Azerbaijan.

Since 2009, he has been the Chairman of the Board of Directors and a shareholder of AZNAR, a natural juice and agriculture company based in Azerbaijan, named after his father, Teymur Akhmedov.

== Political career ==
=== Russia ===
In 2004, Akhmedov was appointed a representative of the Administration of the Krasnodar Territory in the Federation Council of the Russian Federation (until 2007). He was the first, and remains the only ethnic Azerbaijani to have sat in the upper chamber of the legislative authority of the Russian Federation. From 2007 to 2009, he was a representative of the Assembly of Deputies of the Nenets Autonomous Area in the Federation Council. In the period 2007 - 2010, Akhmedov was in the Russian delegation to the Parliamentary Assembly of the Council of Europe (PACE).

He has a personal blog on the Echo of Moscow portal, a liberal news source in Russia that has fallen afoul of Russia's censorship of coverage of the war in Ukraine.

According to Akhmedov, he has been involved in negotiations to resolve international disputes between Russia and Turkey. Turkish Foreign Minister Mevlüt Çavuşoğlu described Akhmedov as a diplomatic go-between "who has worked closely with Putin and knows Putin well."

In January 2018, Akhmedov was included in the so-called "Kremlin report" - a US Treasury document submitted to the US Congress in accordance with the Countering America's Adversaries Through Sanctions Act (CAATSA).

=== Azerbaijan ===
He supported the liberal reforms of Azerbaijani president, Ilham Aliyev.

Akhmedov acted as a middleman between the American PR firm Ballard Partners and the authoritarian Ilham Aliyev regime in Azerbaijan. In 2017, he was photographed at a Republican National Committee alongside Lev Parnas and Republican megadonor Steve Wynn.

On 15 September 2020, Aliyev signed a decree awarding Akhmedov the Dostlug Order for merits in the development of mutual relations between Azerbaijan and Russia after the Nagorno-Karabakh conflict in 2020.

== Personal life ==
Akhmedov has been married three times with six children from those marriages. His wife, Anna Akhmedova (née Adamova) was born in 1983. His children were born in the United States and UK, they are believed to have dual-citizenship.

His eldest son Teymur owned an apartment in the United Kingdom, that was gifted to him by his father when Teymur was 18. During a 2021 divorce trial between Teymur's parents, Teymur revealed that he had lost more than $50m in a single day of trading on the stock market in 2012 while a student at the London School of Economics.

Akhmedov is the main sponsor of the Azerbaijan Goychay Pomegranate Festival.

=== Wealth ===
Since 2011, Akhmedov has permanently been on the list of top 200 richest people in Russia according to the Russian version of Forbes magazine. In 2019, he ranked 67th in the rating of the richest people in Russia (estimated private fortune - $1.4 billion). In the list of billionaires of the world version of Forbes, he ranks at 2141st.

Akhmedov owns the $300 million superyacht Luna which he bought from Russian oligarch Roman Abramovich. Following sanctions against Akhmedov after the Russian invasion of Ukraine in 2022, the ship was seized by German authorities.

In 2015, he acquired the painting Untitled Yellow and Blue by the American artist Mark Rothko for $46.5 million.

=== Divorce proceedings ===
After Akhmedov sold his stake in Northgas CJSC, his ex-wife, Tatyana Akhmedova, from whom he claimed to have been divorced in Russia in 2000, initiated a lawsuit in London. In December 2016, the High Court of London awarded her £453 million ($585 million, or 41.5%) in a divorce settlement. Akhmedov refused to recognise the court's decision, after which the court issued an international order to freeze his assets.

In the midst of the legal proceedings was the yacht Luna, owned by the Akhmedov family. in October 2017, the vessel was moored in Dubai following a London court order. The two-year process ended in October, 2019 with a verdict in favour of Akhmedov and the removal of the order on the vessel.

Tatyana Akhmedova tried unsuccessfully to file a lawsuit against Akhmedov in a court in the Moscow Region. Their lawsuit was rejected. In January 2020, they filed a new lawsuit in London. In 2021, a British court found that Farkhad Akhmedov's son Teymur had worked with his father, by receiving $50m to help his father avoid paying a £453 million settlement to his mother in the divorce.

==== Burford Capital ====
Burford Capital, the US-UK litigation funding company, received a payout of $103m USD from Tatiana Akhmedova upon the conclusion of Farkhad and Tatiana's 10 year divorce battle in June 2021.

Burford Capital received approximately 55% ($103m out of $186m) of the total settlement amount of $186m USD, according to Bloomberg.

According to the official press release from Burford Capital, the settlement contributed over $20m to its operating profit in 2021.

=== Russia-Ukraine Conversation Leak ===
On March 25, 2023, a 35-minute audio recording of a conversation between, presumably, Producer Iosif Prigozhin and Farkhad Akhmedov, was widely circulated in the Ukrainian and Russian media and caused a public sensation in both countries. In the recording, both interlocutors criticize the leadership of Russia in obscene form. On March 26, Prigozhin made a statement that the recording was a “fake” utilizing neural networks, but later said that “some moments” in the conversation were real.

The call exposed deep resentment towards the Kremlin among the country’s elite.

Akhmedov calls Putin “Satan”, a “wimp” and a “dwarf” who “doesn’t give a damn about anything and doesn't give a f--- about the people”.

“They f----- us over, f----- over children, their future, do you get it?” he adds.

Prigozhin replies: “They’re criminals, to be honest, criminals of the worst kind. He [Putin] squandered the country away … There won’t be any future for us.”

Akhmedov later says: “He has buried the entire Russian nation... How are we going to wash this off? This is a war between f------ brothers. There will be fascism there, that’s what’s going to happen... a military dictatorship. You will see. It’s going to end like this.”
