= Leonid Lebedev =

Russian entrepreneur

- In office 2002–2015

Personal details
- Born: May 2, 1956 (age 70) Moscow, Russian SFSR, Soviet Union
- Citizenship: Cypriot; Russian
- Party: United Russia
- Children: 2
- Education: D. Mendeleev University of Chemical Technology of Russia
- Occupation: Businessman; former politician
- Known for: Former owner of Sintez Group, film producer

Leonid Lebedev (born 2 May 1956) is a Cypriot–Russian businessman, filmmaker, and former member of the Federation Council from 2002 to 2015.

Lebedev is the former sole owner of Sintez Group, a privately held energy, oil, and gas and property development company. Alongside Alexander Zhukov and Mark Garber, who was a director and asset manager at Fleming Family and Partners, he co-founded the Soviet–American joint venture SINTEZ International in 1988 and the Russia–United Kingdom joint venture SINTEZ Corporation in January 1990, which he left in the early 2000s. According to Forbes Russia, Sintez ranked 154th among private companies in Russia in 2012. According to Forbes, Lebedev is listed at position 162 among richest people with $750 million in 2021.

He has also been a businessman in music and film, serving as a producer, during the 1980s and more recently, in creating independent films such as Hipsters and The Geographer Drank His Globe Away.

In 2002, he was elected to the Federation Council (Russia), Russia's Upper House of Parliament, representing Chuvashia until he retired from politics and left Russia in 2015.

== Early life ==
Leonid Lebedev was born in Moscow. He earned a degree in engineering from the D. Mendeleev University of Chemical Technology of Russia in 1979.

He served as a consultant to the USSR Chamber of Commerce and Mosconcert during the early 1980s.

== Entrepreneurship ==
In the early 1980s, Lebedev began his entrepreneurial career by organizing rock concerts.

=== Sintez Records ===
In 1989 Lebedev co-founded Sintez Records, a recording studio and label for underground rock artists. The label recorded music by Nautilus Pompilius, Time Machine and Oleg Gazmanov, among others.

=== Sintez International ===
In the 1990s, following Perestroika, Lebedev co-founded Sintez International, a Soviet–American joint venture, which traded in commodities and industrial supplies.

According to Forbes, Lebedev is "one of the few Soviets who experimented with joint business ventures between the capitalistic US and the socialistic USSR in the 1980s". He is "not your typical Russian businessman who took advantage of early privatization or operated under some influential politician's wing". Forbes further states, "He sunk wells where there were none and struck black gold," pointing out his "entrepreneurial experience" accumulated in "tumultuous times in Russia." Sintez was the first Russian private company in the oil sector to conduct offshore exploration in the Arctic. In Western Siberia, Sintez built an oil production plant, called Negusneft, developed its infrastructure, and undertook industrial trading and exports.

=== Sale of Russian energy supplier TGK-2 ===
In relation to the sale of the Russian energy company TGK-2 in 2008, Sintez sued the German company RWE in 2011 for damages of around 700 million euros. RWE was accused of having backed out of the deal to purchase TGK-2 at short notice and without valid justification, thereby driving Sintez to the brink of ruin. There seemed to be numerous discrepancies: For example, according to press reports, there was only one bidder at the auction, although there had previously been talk in the media of weighty interested parties. In 2015, the Essen Regional Court dismissed Sintez's lawsuit against RWE. However, the court also ruled that a lawsuit against then RWE CEO Jürgen Großmann was admissible. According to media reports, Großmann is said to have pushed the transaction personally and even called in former German Chancellor Gerhard Schröder to influence the ultimately failed deal through Russian politics.

=== Sale of Russian oil company TNK-BP ===
In connection to the sale of TNK-BP to Rosneft in 2013, Lebedev sued his former partners, Viktor Vekselberg and Leonard Blavatnik, in February 2014 for breach of contract for $2 billion in the Supreme Court of the State of New York.

== Film producer ==
=== Red Arrow ===
Lebedev is a movie producer with more than twenty feature films in his portfolio. He was a co-founder and a co-owner of the "Red Arrow" film studio in Russia. In 2008, he joined forces with director Valery Todorovsky to co-produce Hipsters (film) (in Russian, Stilyagi) a romantic comedy set in 1950s Moscow, and Russia's first post-Soviet musical. He also produced The Geographer Drank His Globe Away (film), which won the Gran Prix at the 2013 Kinotavr film festival and at the 2013 Film Festival Cottbus. Lebedev's filmography is notable for championing new voices.

=== Filmography ===
- DAU, producer, 2026
- The Liberation, executive producer, 2026
- Rental Family, executive producer, 2025
- The American Society of Magical Negroes, executive producer, 2024
- Willie Nelson & Family, executive producer, 2023
- A Thousand and One, executive producer 2023; 2024 Independent Spirit Award for Best First Feature, 2023 Gotham Award Breakthrough Director Award, 2023 Sundance Grand Jury Award
- Bad Hair, executive producer, 2023
- Bad Education (2020), executive producer, starring: Hugh Jackman; Emmy Winner 2020; Outstanding Television Movie; Gold Derby Award; OFTA Television Award; Emmy Award Nomination for Outstanding Lead Actor in a Limited Series or Movie; OFTA Award for Best Actor in a Motion Picture or Limited Series; Hollywood Critics Association Midseason Award
- Monsters and Men (2018), executive producer. Winner, Sundance Film Festival Jury Prize, Outstanding First Feature
- Dear White People (TV series, 2017–2021), 2017 AAFCA Award: named one of the ten best television series; 2020 Humanitas Prize: awarded in the 30 minutes category; South by Southwest 2017: audience award in the television series category
- Diane (2018), Los Angeles Film Critics Association: award for best actress; National Society of Film Critics: award for best actress; Premiered at Tribeca Film Festival
- The Dinner (2017), played in competition at the Berlinale
- Dear White People (2014), premiered at the Sundance Film Festival where it won the Breakthrough Talent Award
- The Geographer Drank His Globe Away (2014), Odesa International Film Festival: Grand Prix "Golden Duke" and Viewers' Choice Award; Nika Award: Best Film, Best Male Actor, Best Female Actor, Best Director, Best film Score; Golden Eagle Award: Best Director, Best Actor, Best Actress; 2013 Russian Guild of Film Critics Awards: Best Film, Best Male Actor, Best Female Actor; XXIV Open Russian Film Festival "Kinotavr": Main prize, Best Male Actor, Best Film Score, Film distributors jury prize, Special prize of the magazine The Hollywood Reporter
- Celestial Wives of the Meadow Mari (2012), Grand Prix at the New Horizons Film Festival (Wrocław)
- Skipped Parts (Russian: Детям до 16; 2010), Odessa International Film Festival: Best Film and People's Choice Award; Window to Europe: Best Actress; Russian Guild of Film Critics: Best Actress
- Hipsters (Russian: Стиляги; 2008), Nika Award for the best fiction film (2009); Golden Eagle for the best fiction film (2010); premiered at the Toronto Film Festival
- Music for December (Russian: Музыка для декабря; 1995), film was screened in the Un Certain Regard section at the 1995 Cannes Film Festival, Nika Award for Best Sound Engineering

== Political activities ==
From 2002 to 2015, Lebedev was a member of the Federal Council, the second parliamentary chamber of the Russian Federation, as a representative of the Chuvash Republic.

Lebedev continued his business ventures during his 13-year parliamentary career. A media article states that, "unlike other oligarchs, his companies survived the change from the Yeltsin era to the new Russia under Vladimir Putin without major setbacks." In 2015, he resigned his mandate.

== Personal life ==
Lebedev is widowed and has two adult daughters. He lives in the US since 2015 when he left Russia indefinitely.

As a helmsman and co-owner of his sailing team Synergy, he frequently participated in sailing competitions on his RC44 yacht.

In 2013, Lebedev earned a PhD by Belgorod State Technological University in colloidal chemistry (the topic of PhD dissertation: Kolloidno-elektrokhimicheskiye aspekty zashchity ot korrozii konstruktsionnykh staley oborudovaniya yadernykh energeticheskikh ustanovok (Colloidal and electrochemical aspects of anticorrosion protection of structural steel in nuclear power plants equipment).

In 2017, it was reported in The Guardian that Lebedev had acquired Cypriot citizenship.

== Philanthropy ==
Lebedev supports numerous philanthropic projects in the field of culture and education. Lebedev "enjoys a reputation as a discreet patron of the arts" and is one of the founders of the Chuvashia Fund, which operates in the Russian region of the same name and supports various initiatives in the region in the fields of healthcare, education, and culture. Among other social projects in the Chuvash region, Lebedev has donated funds for the construction of two churches in Cheboksary. In 2011, he was awarded the Order of the Russian Orthodox Church of St. Innocent for supporting the publication of the book "Orthodoxy in China." He was also awarded the Order of the Metropolitan of Moscow and Kolomna and the Order of Sergius of Radonezh for his chartable work.

Lebedev was one of the sponsors of the 2005 exhibition of Russian art at the Guggenheim Museum in New York, held to mark the 60th anniversary of the founding of the UN, which was the first time a retrospective of Russian art from 12th-century icons to modern art objects was shown outside of Russia.

== Awards ==
- Emmy Award, Outstanding Television Movie 2020
- Order of Honour
- Jubilee Medal "300 Years of the Russian Navy"
- Order of St. Innocent
