= Dasha Zhukova =

Russian art collector, businesswoman and magazine editor (born 1981)

- Даша Жукова
- Born: Darya Alexandrovna Zhukova; 8 June 1981 (age 45); Moscow, Russian SFSR, Soviet Union
- Citizenship: Russian; American
- Education: University of California, Santa Barbara (BA); New York University (MA)
- Occupations: Art collector; businesswoman; magazine editor; socialite
- Spouses: Roman Abramovich (m. 2008; div. 2018); Stavros Niarchos III (m. 2019)
- Children: 5
- Parents: Alexander Zhukov (father); Elena Zhukova (mother)
- Relatives: Philip Niarchos (father-in-law); Rupert Murdoch (stepfather)

Darya "Dasha" Alexandrovna Zhukova (Russian: Дарья "Даша" Александровна Жукова; born 8 June 1981) is a Russian-American art collector, businesswoman, magazine editor, and socialite. She is the founder of the Garage Museum of Contemporary Art and Garage Magazine.

== Early life and education ==
Darya Alexandrovna Zhukova was born in Moscow on 8 June 1981. Her father is Alexander Zhukov, an oil trader. Her mother is Elena Zhukova, a Russian-Jewish scientist of molecular biology. Her parents separated when she was 3. In 1991, she moved with her mother to the United States, settling in the Houston area as her mother had relocated due to work. They later moved to Los Angeles, California. By the time Elena retired, she was a professor of molecular biology at UCLA, as well as an authority on diabetes.

Zhukova attended a Jewish day school in California. It was a Hebrew college, Dasha's first school in the US, and she attended it for three years. She attended Pacific Hills School, graduating in 1999. She graduated with honors from the University of California, Santa Barbara with degrees in Slavic studies and literature. After becoming involved with Roman Abramovich, she returned to Moscow and later moved to London where she enrolled at the College of Naturopathic Medicine but did not complete the program. In 2023, Zhukova graduated from NYU with a Masters of Arts.

== Career ==
In 2006, Zhukova co-founded the fashion label Kova & T. She currently sits on the boards for the Los Angeles County Museum of Art, Metropolitan Museum of Art, and The Shed.

In 2008, Zhukova founded the Garage Center for Contemporary Culture (part-funded by Abramovich) in Moscow, a nonprofit organization supporting the advancement of contemporary art and culture in Russia and abroad. In 2012, the center launched the first comprehensive art education program and public archive of Russian art in the country. In 2014, the institution changed its name to Garage Museum of Contemporary Art and, the following year, moved to its first permanent home in Gorky Park. The building, designed by Rem Koolhaas, is a preservation project that transformed a 1968 Soviet Modernist canteen into a radical space for exhibitions, publishing, research, and education.

In February 2009, Zhukova was appointed editor-in-chief of the fashion magazine Pop. Many in the industry saw her as an unlikely replacement for launch editor Katie Grand. In an interview at the time she was unable to name a single artist she admired, saying she was bad with names. She resigned from the position after three issues in November 2010.

In addition, Zhukova is the editorial director of GARAGE magazine, a biannual print publication that focuses on the collaboration between contemporary art and fashion. Since its inception, GARAGE magazine has worked with some of the world's most celebrated creators and initiated global artistic dialogues. Among the magazine's contributors are artists such as Jeff Koons, Damien Hirst, Nick Knight, Marc Jacobs, Richard Prince, John Baldessari, Inez & Vinoodh, and Patrick Demarchelier. The magazine took its name and spirit from Garage Museum of Contemporary Art. She also is a founding member of the Culture Shed in New York.

=== Racist chair controversy ===
In 2014, a photograph of Zhukova sitting on a chair designed as a mannequin of a black woman was featured on Buro 24/7, an online fashion publication. The photograph was widely criticized as racist. Buro 24/7 cropped the chair from the photo and Zhukova apologized, describing the chair as artwork and as "commentary on gender and racial politics". Zhukova added, "I utterly abhor racism and would like to apologise to those offended by my participation in this shoot".

== Personal life ==
In 2008, Zhukova married Roman Abramovich, a Russian businessman who is the main owner of the private investment company Millhouse LLC and was at the time the owner of Chelsea Football Club. The couple have two children, a son and a daughter, who were both born in the United States. In August 2017, the couple announced that they would separate.

On 11 October 2019, Zhukova married Stavros Niarchos III, son of Philip Niarchos, in a civil ceremony in Paris, France. The couple have three children together - two sons (born March 2021 and November 2024) and a daughter (born 2023).

Zhukova holds dual Russian and American citizenship. The businessman Rupert Murdoch became her stepfather after he and Zhukova's mother married in June 2024.

Zhukova donated to Hillary Clinton's presidential campaign. She also donated to the Democratic National Committee.
