= Luna (yacht) =

Luxury motor yacht

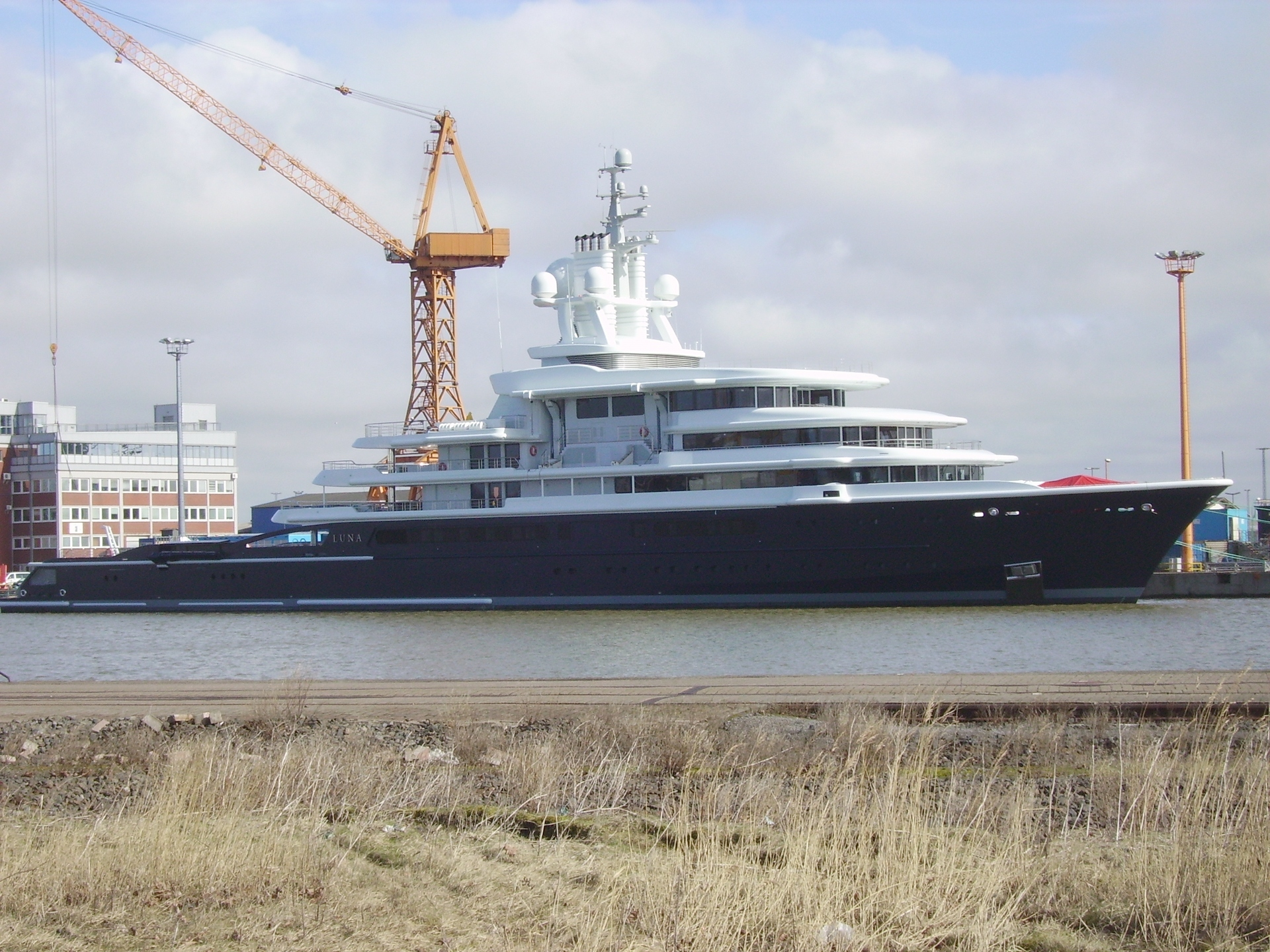

History

Marshall Islands
- Name: Luna
- Owner: Blue Sea Trust
- Builder: Lloyd Werft, Germany
- Cost: €250m (April 2010)
- Launched: October 2009
- Christened: April 2010
- In service: April 2010
- Identification: IMO number: 1010222; MMSI number: 538071095; Callsign: V7NV8

General characteristics
- Class & type: Ice Class
- Type: Motor yacht
- Tonnage: 5,750 GT
- Length: 115 m (377 ft)
- Beam: 22.5 m (74 ft)
- Height: 47.46 m (155.7 ft)
- Draft: 6.49 m (21.3 ft)
- Decks: 10
- Installed power: 11 MW (15,000 hp)
- Speed: 22.5 knots max speed, 18 knots cruising speed
- Range: 9,000 nmi (17,000 km; 10,000 mi) at 16–18 knots
- Boats & landing craft carried: 8
- Crew: 52
- Aviation facilities: 2 MCA Helicopter pads with fire suppression system and full night time landing certification with on board helicopter landing/maintenance/fire team

Luna is the world's second-largest expedition yacht. In 2022 it was seized by authorities in Germany.

== Ownership history ==
Luna was delivered to Russian businessman Roman Abramovich on 10 April 2010. Its exterior was designed by NewCruise of Germany and its interior by Donald Starkey. The yacht's cost has been estimated at over €250m.

Luna was sold to Azerbaijani Farkhad Akhmedov, for €200m in April 2014. In October 2014 the yacht was sent to Bremerhaven, Germany, for an extensive refit costing €50m. The yacht was delivered in March 2016 after a 16-month extensive refit. She featured at the centre of a dispute between Akhmedov and his ex-wife, Tatyana Akhmedova, after an English High Court judgement awarded Tatiana a disputed £453 million matrimonial settlement. Following the Luna ruling, Farkhad and Tatiana settled their dispute. Luna became property of the Blue Sea Trust, reported to be the owning entity of the Akhmedov family. In October 2021, having undergone a refurbishment following her stay in Dubai, Luna set sail once again heading through the Suez Canal and into the Mediterranean and arriving at Lloyd Werft shipyard to undergo maintenance.

In March 2022, Forbes reported that Luna was still owned by Farkhad Akhmedov. At the time, she had been sanctioned by the EU, UK, Canada, and Switzerland, and was still registered in the Marshall Islands with a value of $196 million. She was frozen by German authorities on 12 May 2022, and on 23 May 2022, was recorded in Hamburg, Germany.

Public prosecutors searched the ship in early May 2023, citing that the 67-year old owner has been hiding substantial assets he is suspected to hold in Germany from the authorities.

== See also ==
- List of motor yachts by length
