= Roman Abramovich =

Russian- Israeli-Portuguese business oligarch (born 1966)

- Роман Абрамович
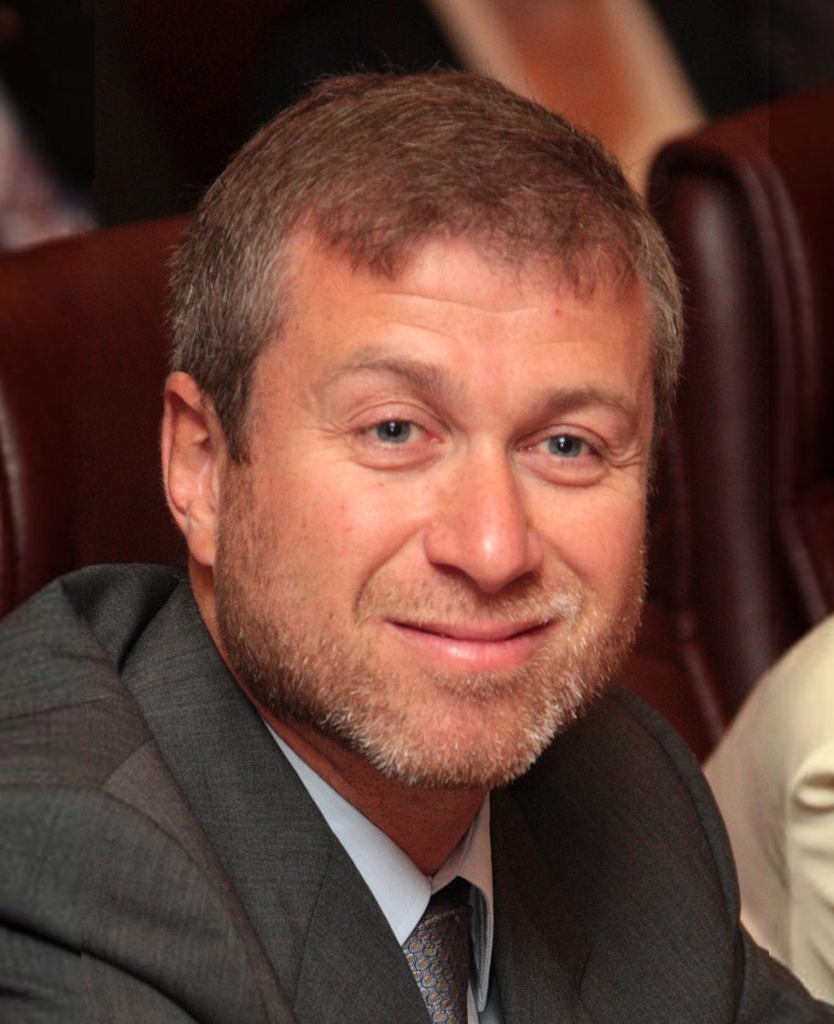
- Abramovich in 2008

Governor of Chukotka
- In office 17 December 2000 – 3 July 2008
- Preceded by: Aleksandr Nazarov
- Succeeded by: Roman Kopin

Member of the State Duma from Chukotka constituency
- In office 10 January 2000 – 17 December 2000
- Preceded by: Vladimir Babichev
- Succeeded by: Vladimir Yetylin

Personal details
- Born: 24 October 1966 (age 60) Saratov, Russian SFSR, Soviet Union
- Citizenship: Russia; Israel; Portugal
- Party: Independent
- Spouses: Olga Lysova (m. 1987; div. 1990) Irina Malandina (m. 1991; div. 2007) Dasha Zhukova (m. 2008; div. 2018)
- Children: 7, including Arkadiy Abramovich
- Education: Moscow State Law University; Russian State University of Oil and Gas
- Occupation: Businessman; Politician
- Known for: Former owner of Chelsea
- Awards: Order of Honour; Order of Friendship

Roman Arkadyevich Abramovich (Note: In this name that follows East Slavic naming customs, the patronymic is Arkadyevich and the family name is Abramovich.) (Note: Russian: Роман Аркадьевич Абрамович, Russian pronunciation: [rɐˈman ɐrˈkadʲjɪvʲɪtɕ ɐbrɐˈmovʲɪtɕ]) (born 24 October 1966) is a Russian business oligarch and politician. He is the former owner of Chelsea, a Premier League football club in London. He has Russian, Portuguese and Israeli citizenship.

Abramovich was Governor of Chukotka Autonomous Okrug from 2000 to 2008.

Abramovich, including his family and affiliated related trusts, is the 371st richest person in the world with a net worth of $9.3 billion according to Forbes and the 444th richest person in the world with a net worth of $8.56 billion according to Bloomberg L.P. He is the fifth-richest person with Israeli citizenship.

Abramovich enriched himself in the loans for shares scheme by Boris Yeltsin following the dissolution of the Soviet Union, acquiring a stake in Sibneft in partnership with Boris Berezovsky for approximately $100 million in 1995, well below market value. In 2005, he sold the stake to the Russian government under Vladimir Putin for $13 billion. Like most Russian oligarchs, Abramovich is considered to have a good relationship with Putin. As a result of these alleged relations, he has been subject to sanctions following the 2022 Russian invasion of Ukraine. Abramovich allegedly now spends most of his time in Turkey. Abramovich's assets are held in a web of companies; many of his assets are based in Jersey.

== Early life ==
Roman Arkadyevich Abramovich was born on 24 October 1966 in Saratov, then part of the Russian Soviet Federative Socialist Republic of the Soviet Union. His mother, Irina (1939–1967), was a music teacher who died of sepsis following a botched illegal abortion when Abramovich was one year old. His father, Aaron Abramovich Leibovich (1937‑1969), worked in the economic council of the Komi ASSR and was crushed to death when a crane collapsed on him when Roman was three years old.

Both parents were of Jewish descent. Roman's maternal grandparents were Ukrainian Jews Vasily Mikhailenko, who converted to Judaism, and Faina Borisovna Grutman. Early in the Second World War, just before the Nazi invasion, Abramovich's mother, then aged three, fled with her family to Saratov from Kyiv. Some of their relatives who remained in Kyiv were among the 33,771 Jews murdered by the Einsatzgruppen in September 1941 at Babi Yar. Roman's paternal grandparents, Nachman Leibovich and Toybe (Tatyana) Stepanovna Abramovich, were Belarusian Jews. They lived in Belarus and, after the Russian Revolution, moved to Tauragė, Lithuania, where the family name took the Lithuanian spelling Abramavičius. In 1940, during the occupation of the Baltic states by the Soviet Union (USSR), shortly before Operation Barbarossa, the Soviets carried out the "clearing of the anti‑Soviet, criminal and socially dangerous element", with entire families being sent to gulags in Siberia. Abramovich's grandfather, Nachman Leibovich, was a merchant and branded a "capitalist"; he was deported to an NKVD camp in the settlement of Resheti, Krasnoyarsk Territory, where he died in 1942. The father, mother and children – Leib, Abram and Aron (Arkady) – were held in separate gulags.

In late 1969, having lost both parents, Abramovich was taken in as an orphan by his maternal aunt Lyudmila and her husband, Uncle Leib, in Ukhta, Komi Republic, near the Arctic Circle in northern Russia, where winter temperatures fall to −30 °C. Together with their cousins Natalya and Ida, the family of five shared a three‑room flat; his aunt and uncle slept on the sofa. His uncle Leib was the director of supplies at a local factory. Abramovich was described by one neighbour as a "polite and quiet boy, not rowdy like the others". Despite the harsh climate and the family's lack of money, he has said that his childhood was not unhappy, because "as a child you cannot tell the difference". Nevertheless, he always harboured a desire to leave Ukhta, which he considered "too small". At the age of eight, he attended School No 2 in Ukhta, but the following year he went to live with another uncle near Moscow, returning to Ukhta only for his final year of school.

Abramovich left school at sixteen, worked as a mechanic and served in the Soviet Army in an artillery unit in Kirzhach. His monthly pay of 7 roubles was not enough, so he persuaded several military drivers to siphon off a few litres of petrol from their tanks on a regular basis, offering them a share of the proceeds from the sales together with ice cream and pastries. The unit's officers then bought the stolen petrol at half the market price. No one complained, for everyone profited from the arrangement.

He studied for two years at the technical college in Ukhta and later at the Moscow Road Construction and Automobile Institute, but did not graduate from either. He subsequently attended the Gubkin Institute of Oil and Gas in Moscow. In 2000, he enrolled in a one-year correspondence course at Moscow State Law Academy.

== Career ==
=== Business career ===
==== Early career ====
After Mikhail Gorbachev allowed for greater openness to entrepreneurship under perestroika, Abramovich began selling plastic ducks from a stall in Moscow, eventually moving to perfumes and deodorants.

He and his first wife, Olga, set up a company making dolls. He started and liquidated at least 20 companies in various sectors. Within a few years, his wealth spread from oil trading to pig farms. He also traded in timber, sugar, food stuffs, and other products.

In June 1992, aged 25, Abramovich was arrested and briefly imprisoned on charges of theft of government property for allegedly stealing 55 tankers of diesel fuel, worth 3.8 million rubles, from the Ukhta Oil Refinery. Abramovich allegedly used forged documents to intercept a train carrying the fuel in Moscow and redirect the shipment to a military base, where the diesel was then sold. Despite the seriousness of the charges, Abramovich was not ultimately prosecuted. Lawyers later claimed the incident was a misunderstanding, and the case was dropped after the oil refinery was compensated for its losses.

==== Acquisition of Sibneft ====
Abramovich wanted to get involved in the privatisation of Russian assets and had the idea to combine a refinery with an oil drilling business. He was able to get Petr Aven, the president of Alfa-Bank, to organize a meeting with Boris Berezovsky, who had connections with Boris Yeltsin, on a yacht in the Caribbean, in either 1993 or 1994. Yeltsin was organizing the loans for shares scheme; in exchange for helping Yeltsin get elected in the 1996 Russian presidential election, businessmen would be offered stakes in Soviet assets for a tiny fraction of their market value. Abramovich also thought he needed physical protection, and wanted to ask Berezovsky for advice.

In return for Abramovich agreeing to provide Berezovsky with funds he required for his TV company ORT, Berezovsky agreed he would use his influence to assist in the creation of Sibneft.

Two days before the decision over which companies should be included in the sale of companies by the state, Berezovsky visited Alfred Koch, head of the State Committee for State Property Management, who added Sibneft to the list. With the help of Badri Patarkatsishvili, a friend of Berezovsky, other possible bidders were paid off or received favors so that Abramovich could win the auction.

In August 1995, Boris Yeltsin decreed the creation of Sibneft, with Abramovich and Berezovsky as top executives. Abramovich acquired a controlling interest in Sibneft in a rigged auction, for well below market value. The purchase was handled via an offshore company, Runicom Ltd., with Russian affiliates.

As head of Sibneft, Abramovich reduced taxes by hiring disabled workers and setting up companies in the tax havens of Kalmykia and the Chukotka Autonomous Okrug. In 2001, Sibneft was accused of underpaying taxes but the case was dismissed without charges.

Abramovich sold Sibneft to the Russian government for $13 billion in 2005.

==== Aluminum investments ====
After privatisation, the "aluminium wars" led to murders of smelting plant managers, metals traders, and journalists as groups battled for control of the industry. Abramovich was initially hesitant to enter into the aluminium business, claiming that "every three days someone was murdered in that business". In early 2000, due to the wars, a major strike action, and the rise of Vladimir Putin, David and Simon Reuben sold their aluminium assets to Roman Abramovich in a $575 million deal.

In February 2000, Abramovich met with aluminium oligarchs Iskander Makhmudov, Oleg Deripaska, and Lev Chernoi with a proposal to consolidate the aluminium business in Russia and end the wars, with a major investment by Abramovich. At a meeting at the Balchug Kempinski in Moscow that lasted until 5:00AM, the companies all agreed to merge and form Rusal. Along with SUAL Group, the two companies controlled 90% of the Russian aluminum market.

In two transactions in 2004, Abramovich sold his 50% stake in Rusal to Deripaska for £1.8 billion, making him the richest person in the world under the age of 40.

==== Berezovsky v Abramovich ====
In 2011, Berezovsky filed a civil suit, Berezovsky v Abramovich, in the High Court of Justice in London. He accused Abramovich of blackmail, breach of trust and breach of contract. The suit sought over £3 billion in damages.

In May 2001, Patarkatsishvili asked Abramovich to pay US$1.3 billion (€925 million) to Berezovsky. He agreed to pay this amount on the basis that it would be the final request for payment by Berezovsky and that he and Patarkatsishvili would cease to associate themselves publicly with him and his business interests. However, Berezovsky said that the payment undervalued his interests, leading to the lawsuit.

At a conversation between Abramovich and Berezovsky at Le Bourget airport in December 2000, secretly recorded by Patarkatsishvili, Berezovsky spoke of how they should "legalise" their aluminium business, and later claimed in court that he was an undisclosed shareholder in the aluminium assets and that "legalisation" in this case meant to make his ownership "official". In response, Abramovich stated that they cannot legalise because the other party in the 50–50 joint venture (Rusal) would need to do the same, in a supposed reference to his business partner Oleg Deripaska. Besides Deripaska, references are made to several other players in the aluminium industry at the time that would have had to "legalise" their stake. Abramovich's lawyers later claimed that "legalisation" meant structuring protection payments to Berezovsky to ensure they complied with Western anti-money laundering regulations.

On 31 August 2012, the High Court dismissed the lawsuit. The High Court judge stated that because of the nature of the evidence, the case hinged on whether to believe Berezovsky or Abramovich's evidence. The judge found Berezovsky to be "an unimpressive, and inherently unreliable witness, who regarded truth as a transitory, flexible concept, which could be moulded to suit his current purposes", whereas Abramovich was seen as "a truthful, and on the whole, reliable witness".

It later emerged that the stepson of the judge in the case, Elizabeth Gloster, was paid almost £500,000 to represent Abramovich as a barrister early in the case. Her stepson's involvement was alleged to be more than had been disclosed. Berezovsky stated, "Sometimes I have the impression that Putin himself wrote this judgment". Gloster declined to comment.

==== Other investments ====
In 2001, Abramovich set up Millhouse Capital as an entity to own his investments; it is also part-owned by Eugene Shvidler. Through Millhouse, he owned Prodo group, which invested in meat processing plants.

In 2003, he sold a 37.5% stake in RusPromAvto.

In 2006, Millhouse acquired 41% of Evraz for £1.6 billion.

In December 2007, Millhouse LLC, Abramovich's investment vehicle, acquired a 40% stake in Highland Gold for $400 million. In July 2020, the stake was sold to Vladislav Sviblov for $560 million.

In August 2001, companies linked to Abramovich acquired 29.3% of Aeroflot for $120 million. He sold the stake in 2003.

In February 2013, Abramovich acquired Four Winds Plaza, a new prime office and residential complex on Tverskaya Street in Moscow for $370 million. Later that year, he paid around $750 million for White Gardens, an office complex with 64,000 square meters of rentable space near Moscow Belorussky railway station.

Abramovich was a major investor in Renaissance Insurance.

In February 2022, Abramovich acquired the Hotel Kristall in Gelendzhik, on the Black Sea.

In 2023, a company controlled by Abramovich invested $140,000 in Kiana Analytics, a real-time location services startup based in Sunnyvale, California.

From 2015 to 2021, Abramovich was a limited partner and invested $63 million in venture capital funds managed by Target Global. Startups in which the funds invested include Cazoo and Revolut.

==== Investments in Israeli technology ====
Abramovich has invested $120 million in 20 Israeli high-tech start-ups ranging from medicine and renewable energy, to social media.

Abramovich invested over $30 million in StoreDot, founded by Doron Myersdorf, including $10 million invested in June 2014.

In April 2015, Abramovich invested $15 million in Israeli music sharing start-up Music Messenger, founded by OD Kobo. Other investors included David Guetta, Nicki Minaj, Tiësto, Avicii, will.i.am, Benny Andersson, and Dave Holmes.

== Football ==
=== Chelsea ===
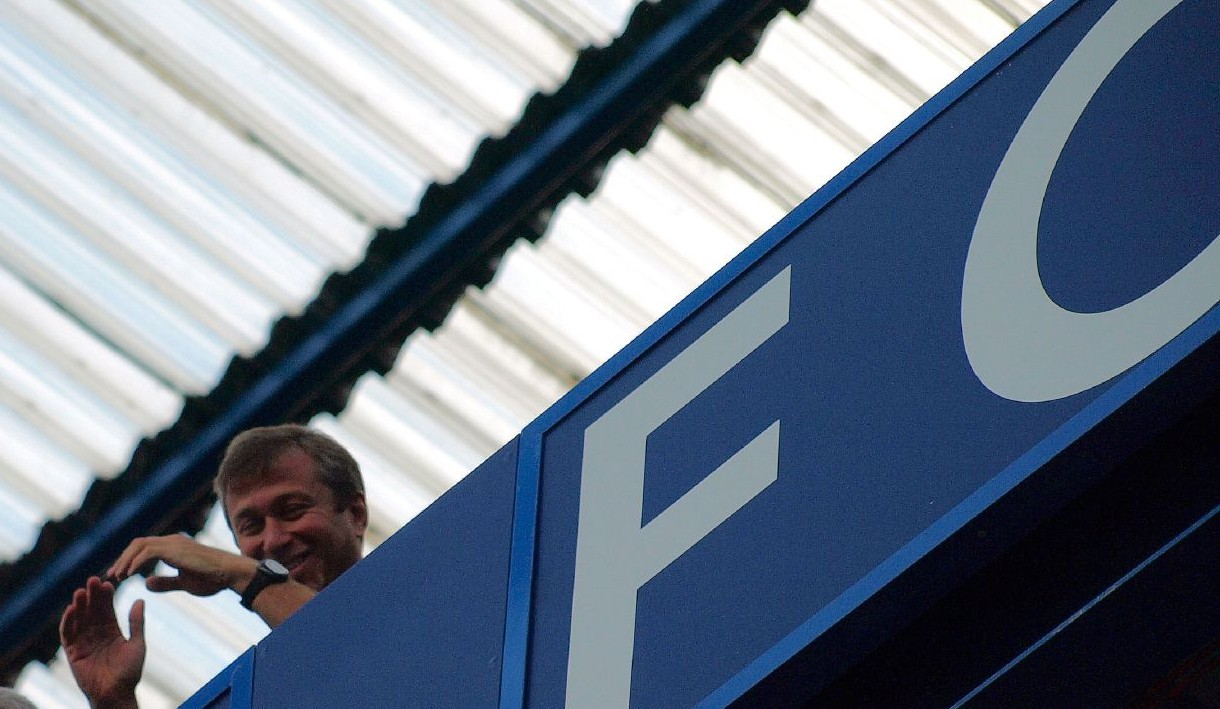
Abramovich at Stamford Bridge during a 4–0 victory over Portsmouth in August 2008

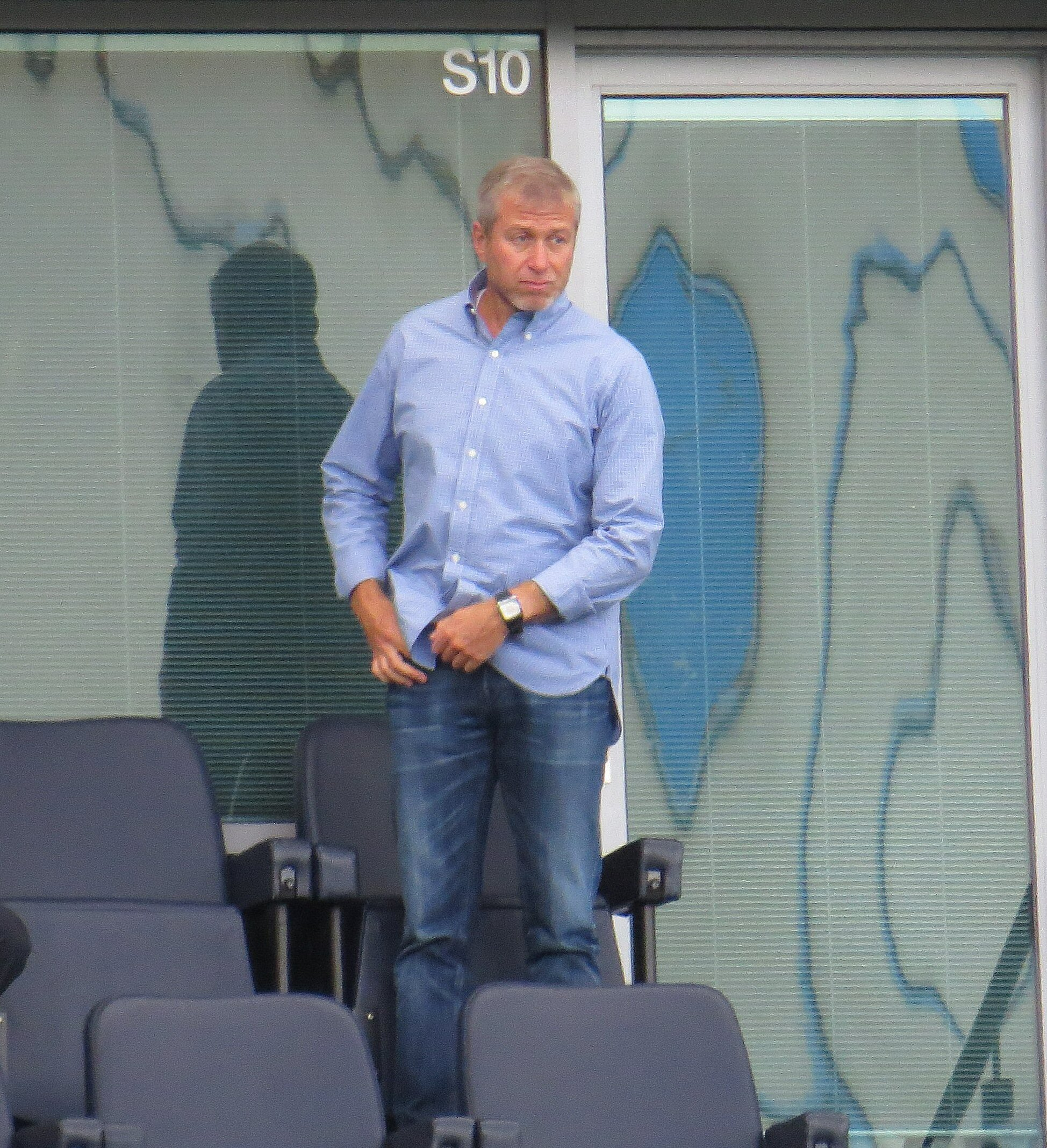
Abramovich watches his team, Chelsea, play against Leicester City in August 2014

In June 2003, Abramovich paid approximately $190 million to acquire the companies that controlled Premier League club Chelsea in West London from Ken Bates.

Chelsea immediately embarked on an ambitious programme of commercial development, with the aim of making it a worldwide brand at par with footballing dynasties such as Manchester United and Real Madrid. As owner, Abramovich spent more than £2 billion on player signings and another £90 million on hiring and firing 13 different managers.

At the time of the acquisition, the team was training at the Harlington recreation ground at Imperial College London. The facilities there were outdated, inferior to those of Manchester United and Liverpool, both of which had dedicated training complexes. In 2004, Abramovich began construction of the £20 million Cobham Training Centre, which opened in 2007.

Under Abramovich, the club won 21 major trophies – the UEFA Champions League twice, the UEFA Europa League twice, the UEFA Supercup once, the FIFA Club World Cup once, the Premier League five times, the FA Cup five times (with 2010 providing the club's first ever league and FA Cup double), the League Cup three times and the FA community shield twice, making Chelsea the most successful English trophy winning team during that period, equal with Manchester United (who have also won 16 major trophies in the same time span).

His tenure has also been marked by rapid turnover in managers. Detractors used the term "Chelski" to refer to the new Chelsea under Abramovich, to highlight the modern phenomena of billionaires buying football clubs and "purchasing trophies", by using their personal wealth to sign marquee players and distorting the transfer market, such as the acquisition of Andriy Shevchenko for a then-British record transfer fee of around £30 million.

Chelsea finished their first season after the takeover in second place in the Premier League, up from fourth the previous year. They also reached the semi-finals of the Champions League, which was eventually won by the surprise contender Porto, managed by José Mourinho. For Abramovich's second season at Stamford Bridge, Mourinho was recruited as the new manager, replacing Claudio Ranieri. Chelsea ended the 2004–05 season as league champions for the first time in 50 years and only the second time in their history. Also high was Abramovich's spending on Portuguese football players. He spent €165.1 million in Portugal: €90.9 million on Benfica players and €74.2 million on Porto players.

During his stewardship of the club, Abramovich was present at nearly every Chelsea game and showed visible emotion during matches, a sign taken by supporters to indicate a genuine love for the sport. He often visited the players in the dressing room following each match. This stopped for a time in early 2007, when press reports appeared of a feud between Abramovich and manager Mourinho regarding the performance of certain players such as Andriy Shevchenko.

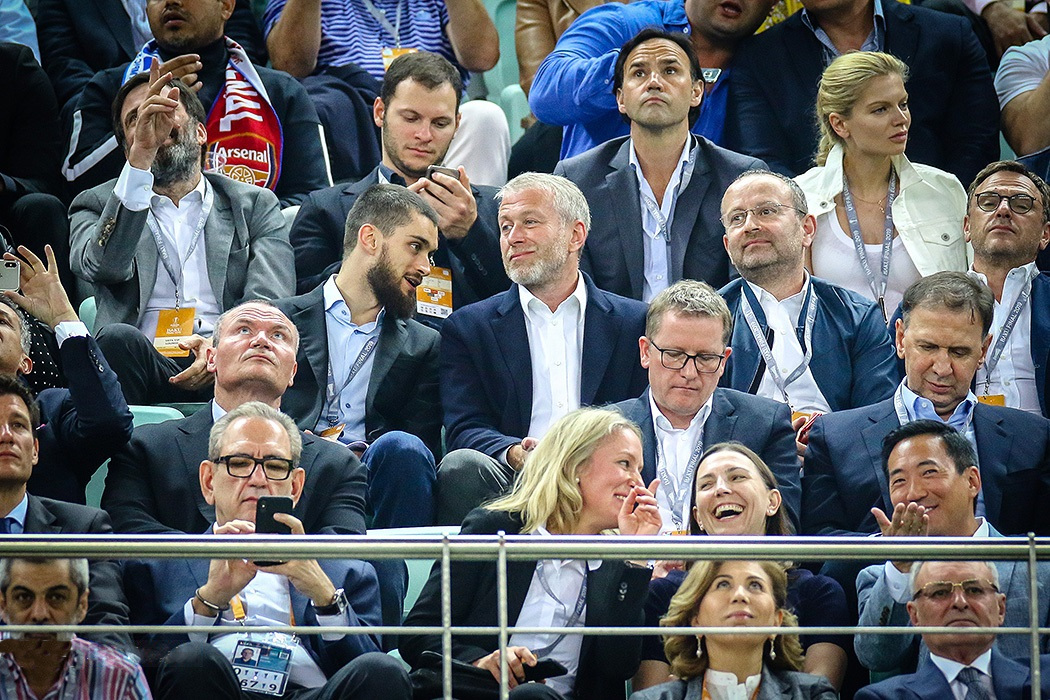
Abramovich at the 2019 UEFA Europa League Final

In March 2017, Chelsea received approval for a revamped £500 million stadium to replace Stamford Bridge, with a capacity of up to 60,000 people. Following the delay in the renewal of Abramovich's British visa by the Home Office, and his subsequent withdrawal of the application, in May 2018, Chelsea halted plans to build the stadium due to the "unfavourable investment climate" and the lack of assurances about Abramovich's immigration status.

In her book Putin's People (2020), Catherine Belton accused Abramovich of purchasing the Chelsea team on the orders of Vladimir Putin; Abramovich denied the claim and sued Belton and publisher HarperCollins for defamation. The defendants agreed that the claims had no factual basis.

In 2021, Abramovich entered Chelsea into the newly announced European Super League. The league was widely scrutinised for encouraging greediness among the richer, larger football clubs, which would have undermined the significance of existing football competitions. Two days later, Abramovich pulled the club out of the new competition, with other English clubs following suit, causing the league to suspend operations.

In 2022, it was reported that Abramovich was owed a $2 billion loan from Chelsea; the loan was set up in advance of possible sanctions.

After the 2022 Russian invasion of Ukraine, Abramovich handed over "stewardship and care" of the club to the Chelsea Charitable Foundation.

In March 2022, Abramovich said that he would sell the club due to the war in Ukraine and the threat of a full asset seizure. Although the UK government froze Abramovich's assets in the United Kingdom due to his "close ties with [the] Kremlin", it was made clear that the Chelsea club would be allowed to operate in activities which were football related. On 12 March, the Premier League disqualified Abramovich as a director of Chelsea.

In May 2022, BlueCo, led by Todd Boehly and Clearlake Capital, acquired the club.

In 2026, the team was fined £10.75 million for making undisclosed payments to agents, non-licensed intermediaries and other figures, including players, around signings between 2011 and 2018, including the signings of Eden Hazard and Samuel Eto'o.

=== CSKA Moscow ===
In March 2004, Sibneft agreed to a three-year sponsorship deal worth €41.3 million (US$58 million) with CSKA Moscow. Although the decision was made by company management, some viewed the deal as an attempt by Abramovich to counter accusations of being "unpatriotic" for buying Chelsea. UEFA rules prevent one person owning more than one team participating in UEFA competitions and Abramovich has no equity interest in CSKA.

Following an investigation, Abramovich was cleared by UEFA of having a conflict of interest. Nevertheless, he was named "most influential person in Russian football" in the Russian magazine Pro Sport at the end of June 2004. In May 2005, CSKA won the UEFA Europa League, becoming the first Russian club ever to win a major European football competition. In October 2005, Abramovich sold his interest in Sibneft to Gazprom, which did not renew the sponsorship deal since it sponsored Zenit Saint Petersburg.

=== Russian national team ===
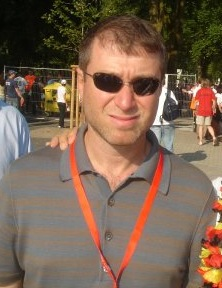
Abramovich at the 2006 FIFA World Cup in Germany

Abramovich helped to fund the Russia national football team, including the $7 million annual salary of its Dutch coach, Guus Hiddink, who was recommended to Abramovich by his personal assistant, Piet de Visser.

=== National Academy of Football ===
As of 2008, Abramovich sponsored the National Academy of Football, which organizes youth sports programmes and constructed more than fifty football pitches in Russia.

== Political career ==
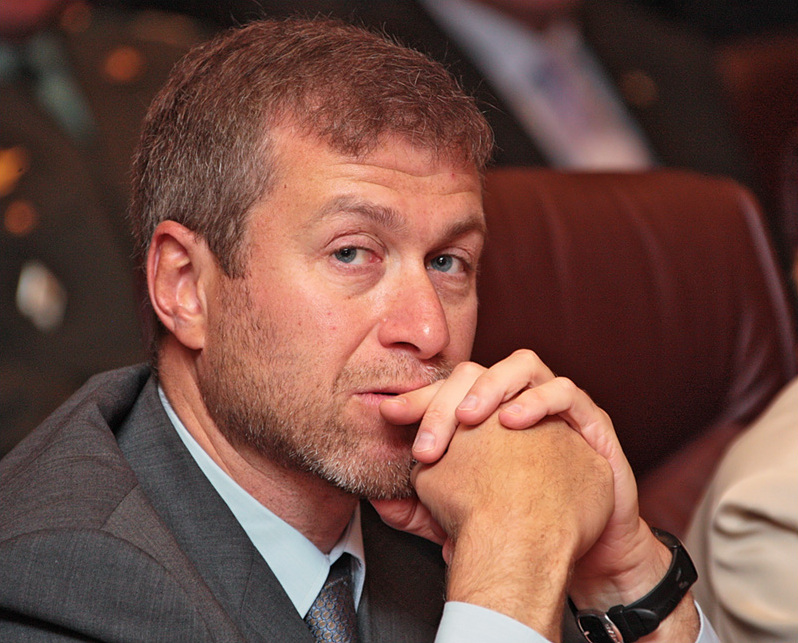
Abramovich in July 2008

"Everyone's got their own reason. Some believe it's because I spent some of my childhood in the far north that I helped Chukotka, some believe it's because I had a difficult childhood that I helped Chukotka, some believe it's because I stole money that I helped Chukotka. None of these is real. When you come out and you see a situation and there are 50,000 people, you want to do something. I haven't seen anything worse than what I saw there in my life."

— Abramovich, on his political and charitable effort in Chukotka.

In 1999, Abramovich was elected to the State Duma as the representative for the Chukotka Autonomous Okrug, an impoverished region in the Russian Far East. He started the charity Pole of Hope to help the people of Chukotka, especially children, and in December 2000, was elected Governor of Chukotka Autonomous Okrug, replacing Aleksandr Nazarov.

As governor, Abramovich spent approximately £1.5 billion of his own money to build schools, hospitals and infrastructure in Chukotka through his charity the Pole of Hope. Abramovich was awarded the Order of Honour for his contribution to the economic development of the region by a decree signed by the President of Russia.

Abramovich tried to resign in 2007, but agreed to stay on at the request of Vladimir Putin.

In early July 2008, to spend more time in the West, and because he felt that his job as governor was completed, Abramovich resigned as governor of Chukotka, although his various charitable activities in the region continued. The average salaries in Chukotka increased from about US$165 (€117/£100) per month in 2000 to US$826 (€588/£500) per month in 2006.

=== Sanctions ===
Abramovich is one of many Russian oligarchs named in the Countering America's Adversaries Through Sanctions Act, CAATSA, signed into law by President Donald Trump in 2017. He is one of the Navalny 35.

Following the 2022 Russian invasion of Ukraine, in March 2022, as a result of his alleged ties to Vladimir Putin and his investments in Russia, Abramovich was sanctioned by the UK, Canada, Australia, the European Union, Switzerland, New Zealand, and Ukraine.

In December 2022, under its Special Economic Measures Act seizure and forfeiture mechanism, Canada filed court proceedings to freeze US$26 million in a bank account of Granite Capital Holdings, which was linked to Abramovich.

In December 2023, Abramovich lost his legal challenge to overturn the EU sanctions, when the Court of Justice of the European Union dismissed his lawsuit.

Jersey froze $7 billion of his assets and searched his residences as part of an investigation into suspected money laundering and sanctions breaches. In 2025, the Judicial Committee of the Privy Council denied an attempt by Abramovich to unfreeze the assets.

The £2.5 billion in proceeds from the sale of Chelsea was frozen. Abramovich has promised to use these funds to support victims of the war in Ukraine, but wants flexibility on exactly how it would be spent. The UK government has threatened legal action to ensure the money is used to support humanitarian aid in Ukraine. In March 2026, authorities in Jersey began investigating the funds amount to "the proceeds of crime". In April 2026, Abramovich filed suit in the European Court of Human Rights claiming that the freeze on his assets is "unfair and abusive" after years of no decision on the use of the funds.

=== Jewish and pro-Israel activity ===
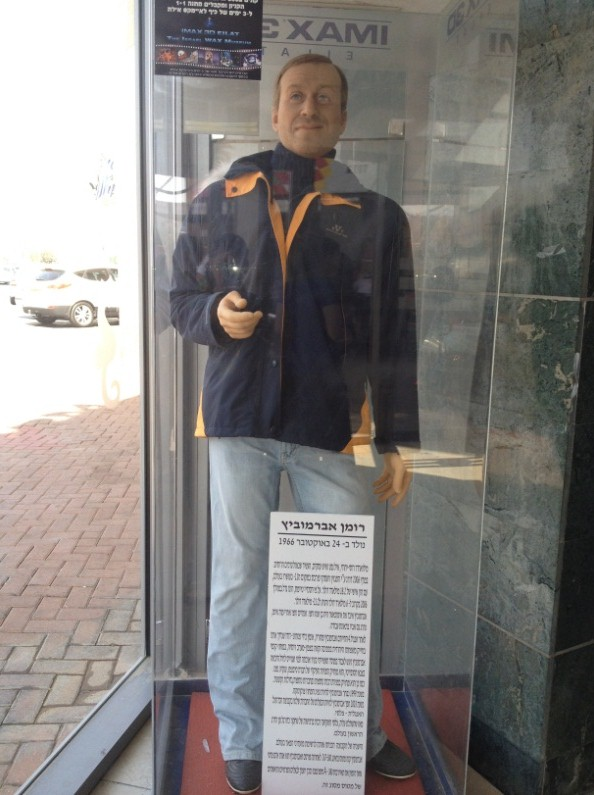
Statue of Abramovich in a mall in Eilat, Israel

Abramovich has funded the M.ART contemporary culture festival in Tel Aviv.

Abramovich funded the establishment of a forest of 25,000 trees in memory of Lithuanian Jews who perished in the Holocaust and Seed a Memory, a virtual memorial and tribute to Lithuanian Jewry.

He also donated for the rehabilitation of the Jewish cemetery of Altona, Hamburg by B'nai B'rith in partnership with the local Chabad.

Abramovich donates money to Chabad.

Along with Michael Kadoorie and Jacob Safra, is one of the main benefactors of the Portuguese Jewish community and the local chapter of B'nai B'rith.

As of 2023, Abramovich was the Chairman of the Federation of Jewish Communities of Russia, and a trustee of the Moscow Jewish Museum.

==== Funding of Israeli settlements in East Jerusalem ====
Four companies controlled by Abramovich have donated $100 million to Ir David Foundation (Elad), which runs City of David and purchases Palestinian homes in East Jerusalem to bolster Jewish presence. Abramovich was the largest single donor to the organisation between 2005 and 2018 per the FinCEN Files.

Israeli settlements are considered illegal under international law.

==== Initiatives to reduce antisemitism ====
In June 2019, Abramovich donated $5 million to the Jewish Agency for Israel to support efforts to combat anti-Semitism globally.

After Abramovich faced antisemitic messages during the 2021 Israel–Palestine crisis, Chelsea agreed to a three-year partnership with the Anti-Defamation League to expand the Center on Extremism. and the Chelsea Foundation, in partnership with the Peres Center for Peace and Innovation and the Israeli Football Association, introduced football sessions for Arab and Jewish children across Israel.

=== 2022 Russia–Ukraine peace negotiations and alleged poisoning ===
The day after the 2022 Russian invasion of Ukraine, Abramovich was asked by Ukrainian magnates to function as informal envoy to Putin.

On 3 and 4 March 2022, Abramovich attended Russia–Ukraine peace negotiations. Abramovich, Ukrainian politician Rustem Umerov, and one other negotiator suffered initial symptoms consistent with likely poisoning with an unknown chemical substance, involving "piercing pain in the eyes", inflammation of the eyes, and skin with some desquamation. They all recovered quickly. Bellingcat investigated the allegation and said that chocolate or water that the three had consumed may have been laced with poison; experts took samples of the substance but were unable to identify the type of material used owing to the passage of time. Western sources said the low dosage of poison was aimed to serve as a warning, most likely to Abramovich, and suspected the attack may have been carried out by hardliners in Moscow who tried to sabotage peace talks. An unnamed US official said that the illness was caused by "environmental factors" rather than poisoning. Additionally, an official in the Ukrainian president's office, Igor Zhovkva, informed the BBC that while he hadn't spoken to Abramovich, participants of the Ukrainian delegation were "fine" and one had said the story was "false". Frank Gardiner of BBC News said that the US denial may be caused by a reluctance to respond in a retaliatory manner to Russia by accepting the deployment of chemical weapons in Ukraine. A spokesman for Zelenskyy said that he had no information about a suspected poisoning.

By late March 2022, Abramovich was "sidelined" from the peace talks.

Abramovich played a key role in the release of Aiden Aslin and other foreign prisoners of war from Russian captivity.

In May 2026, Abramovich came to Kyiv to meet with Zelenskyy. The President of Ukraine sent a letter to Putin through Abramovich.

== Relationship with Russian leaders ==
=== Boris Yeltsin ===
By 1996, at the age of 30, Abramovich had become close to President Boris Yeltsin and had moved into an apartment inside the Kremlin at the invitation of the Yeltsin family.

=== Vladimir Putin ===
Abramovich was one of the first people to recommend to Yeltsin that Vladimir Putin be his successor as the Russian president and Abramovich was involved in interviewing and choosing Putin's cabinet. Subsequently, Abramovich remained one of Putin's closest confidants. In 2007, Abramovich recommended to Putin that he choose Dmitry Medvedev as his successor as president.

Early in his presidency, Putin established a clear hierarchy where oligarchs maintain their assets and privileges in exchange for staying out of politics and pledging complete allegiance to Putin. Under Putin, Russian oligarchs were obliged to obey the state and to show social responsibility, and those who challenged the Kremlin ended up in exile or in prison. Abramovich was complicit with this arrangement.

When Putin came to power, he wanted control of the media, particularly the TV channels. Abramovich was an intermediary in these plans, buying channels and transferring them to friends of Putin, earning praise from Putin. Abramovich acquired a 49% stake in ORT for $80 million; he gifted the stake to Putin.

Chris Hutchins, a biographer of Putin, described the relationship between Putin and Abramovich as like that between a father and a favourite son. In the early 2000s, Abramovich said that when he addressed Putin he uses the Russian language's formal "вы" (like Spanish "usted" or German "Sie"), as opposed to the informal "ты" (like Spanish "tú" or German "du") as a mark of respect for Putin's seniority. Within the Kremlin, Abramovich was referred to as "Mr. A".

In September 2012, the England and Wales High Court judge Elizabeth Gloster claimed that Abramovich's influence on Putin was limited: "There was no evidential basis supporting the contention that Mr. Abramovich was in a position to manipulate, or otherwise influence, President Putin, or officers in his administration, to exercise their powers in such a way as to enable Mr. Abramovich to achieve his own commercial goals."

In 2014, Abramovich hired Robbie Williams to headline a New Year's dinner for Putin's "inner circle" in Moscow. The event was likely the inspiration for Williams' song "Party Like a Russian".

== Other legal issues ==
=== Allegations of loan fraud ===
In 2004, Abramovich, through a former company was one of several Russians accused of using a US$4.8 billion (€3.4 billion) loan from the IMF as personal slush fund; however, an audit sponsored by the IMF determined that all of the IMF funds had been used appropriately.

The European Bank for Reconstruction and Development (EBRD) sued Abramovich, Eugene Shvidler, and others over a £9 million (US$14.9 million/€10.6 million) loan owned by Runicom, which went bankrupt in 2003. By 2018, the amount due was $46 million, including interest and costs. The parties settled on undisclosed terms.

=== Antitrust law violation by Evraz ===
Russia's antitrust body, the Federal Antimonopoly Service, claimed that Evraz, owned 29% by Abramovich, had breached Russian competition law by offering unfavourable terms for contractors and discriminating against domestic consumers for coking coal, a key material used in steel production.

=== 2026 scandal ===
In October 2026, it was revealed that aides of Abramovich had falsified paperwork to help his businesses empire dodge tax liabilities and shield assets. Leaked corporate documents revealed a "carefully orchestrated strategy of backdating documents" which were later provided as false evidence to UK courts. Deloitte Cyprus was named among the companies which helped Abramovich falsify backdated documents to reduce his tax liabilities.

== Personal life ==
Abramovich is described by those close to him as naturally secretive, reserved, calculating and highly efficient. He often dresses simply. He is described as shy and rarely makes eye contact.

=== Marriages and children ===
Abramovich has been married and divorced three times. In December 1987, following a brief stint in the Soviet Army, he married Olga Yurevna Lysova; they divorced in 1990. In October 1991, he married a former Russian Aeroflot stewardess, Irina Malandina. They have five children; Ilya, Arina, Sofia, Arkadiy and Anna.

His eldest daughter Anna is a graduate of Columbia University and lives in New York City, and his daughter Sofia is a professional equestrian who lives in London after graduating from Royal Holloway, University of London. She owns 30 horses, many valued at over $500,000 each. She has publicly criticised Putin for the 2022 Russian invasion of Ukraine.

In October 2006, reports circulated that Irina was seeking a divorce; the reports were denied. However, they divorced in Russia in March 2007, with a reported settlement of US$300 million (€213 million).

In 2008, Abramovich married Dasha Zhukova, daughter of Russian oligarch Alexander Zhukov, and they have two children, a son, Aaron Alexander, and a daughter, Leah Lou. In August 2017, the couple announced that they would separate; their divorce was finalised in 2019.

=== Citizenships and residency ===
==== Israeli citizenship ====
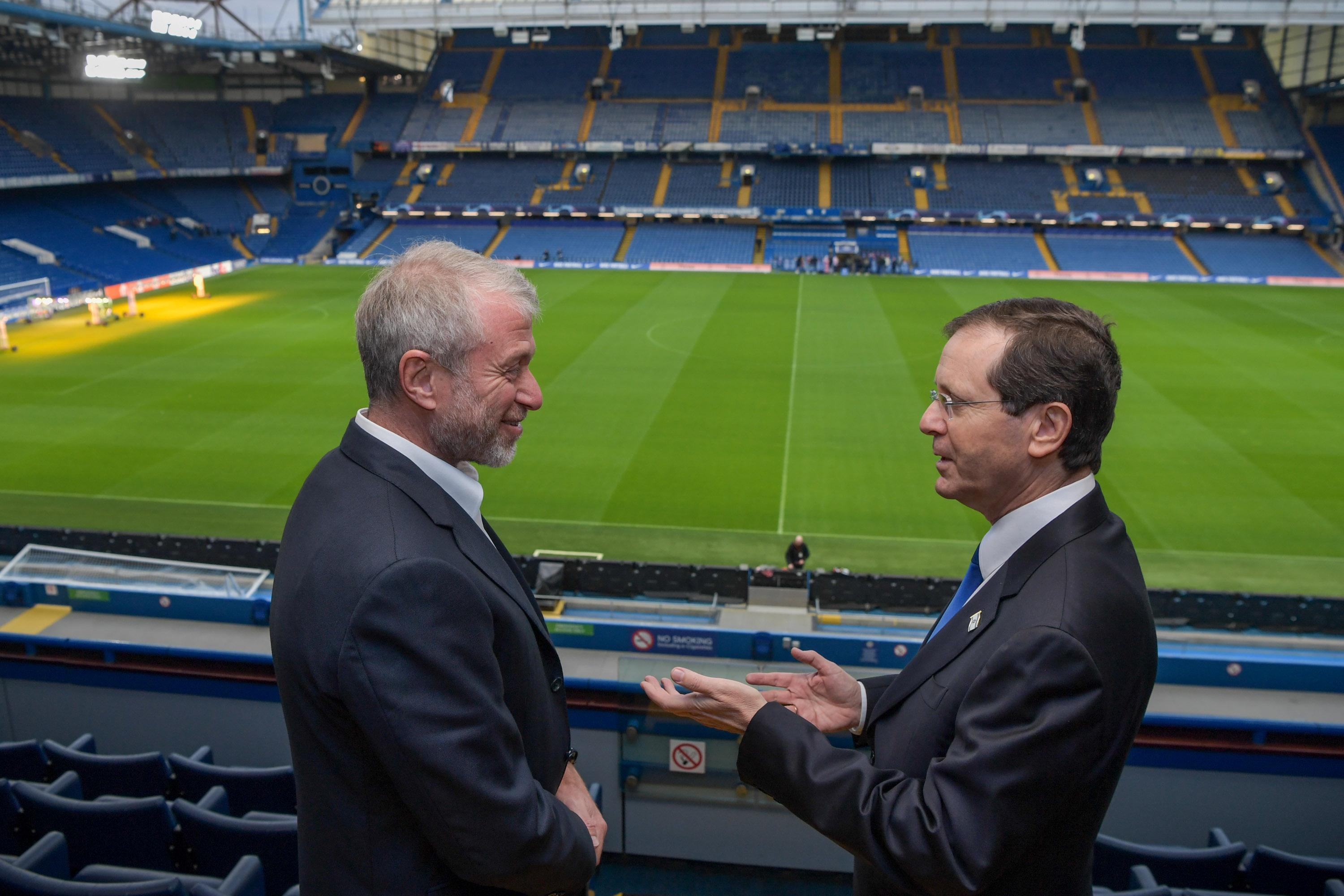
Abramovich with Israeli President Isaac Herzog on 21 November 2021

Abramovich had been travelling in and out of the UK for years on a Tier-1 investor visa, designed for foreigners who invest at least £2 million in Britain. Following the poisoning of Sergei and Yulia Skripal and increased tensions between the UK and Russia, British authorities delayed the renewal of his visa.

In May 2018, under the Law of Return, Abramovich became an Israeli citizen, which, before sanctions were enacted, permitted entry to the UK.

==== Residency in Jersey ====
In September 2017, Abramovich was granted residency in Jersey under a scheme for ultra-high net worth individuals. He transferred $7 billion (£5.3 billion) of assets to Jersey in 2017-2021 after background checks performed by the Foreign and Commonwealth Office directorate of national security; these assets were sanctioned after the 2022 Russian invasion of Ukraine. Abramovich never actually lived in Jersey.

==== Application for Swiss residence permit ====
Abramovich filed an application for a residence permit in the canton of Valais, Switzerland, in July 2016, a tax haven to which he planned to transfer his tax residency. The request was approved by Valais authorities but denied by FedPol investigators due to suspicions of money laundering. Abramovich withdrew his application in June 2017. After a three-year legal saga, in 2021, Swiss authorities cleared Abramovich of any suspicion.

==== Portuguese citizenship ====
In April 2021, Abramovich became a Portuguese citizen as part of the country's Nationality Act granting citizenship to descendants of Sephardi Jews who were expelled during the Inquisition. In March 2022, the rabbi that certified Abramovich's ancestry was arrested for possible fraud in the certifications; however, the allegations were later dropped for lack of evidence. Portugal then tightened the law, requiring applicants to have current connections to Portugal to receive citizenship.

=== Carbon footprint ===
Abramovich is said to have the highest or one of the highest carbon footprints in the world as a result of his superyachts, private jets and ownership in Evraz, which owns coal mines.

== Philanthropy and other contributions ==
Abramovich has reportedly donated more money to charity than any other living Russian.

As governor, Abramovich spent approximately £1.5 billion of his own money to build schools, hospitals and infrastructure in Chukotka through his charity the Pole of Hope.

In addition, Evraz, the steelmaker partly owned by Abramovich, donated US$164 million for social projects between 2010 through 2012, an amount that is excluded in Abramovich's US$310 million donations during this period.

=== Art ===
His former wife, Dasha Zhukova, manages the Garage Museum of Contemporary Art; the gallery was restored in 2008 with donations from Abramovich.

Abramovich sponsored an exhibition of photographs of Uzbekistan by Max Penson (1893–1959), which opened in November 2006 at the Gilbert Collection at Somerset House in London and organised by the Moscow House of Photography.

=== Medicine ===
In 2020, during the COVID-19 pandemic, Abramovich paid for National Health Service staff to stay at the Stamford Bridge Millennium Hotel.

In 2015, Abramovich donated approximately $30 million to Tel Aviv University to establish an innovative centre for nanoscience and nanotechnology.

In March 2018, he donated £14 million to Sheba Medical Center in Tel HaShomer, Israel, for ventures including paediatric heart and cancer research, after earlier donations of £40 million. In May 2020, during the COVID-19 pandemic, Abramovich funded a 5,400 square metre intensive care unit at Sheba.

=== Environmental causes ===
In July 2019, Abramovich made a donation to Keren Kayemet LeIsrael-Jewish National Fund (KKL-JNF) for a comprehensive forest rehabilitation programme in the Negev desert.

== Assets ==
=== Residences ===
In 2001, Abramovich purchased the Château de la Croë in Antibes. He spent €100 million on a restoration, completed in 2008, adding a rooftop swimming pool, gym and home cinema.

In September 2009, Abramovich paid $90 million for a 70-acre estate on Saint Barthélemy. He also is the likely owner of another property on the island. In 2011, Abramovich spent £5 million on a New Years Eve party at the property that featured performances by the Red Hot Chili Peppers and Toots Hibbert and 300 guests including George Lucas, Martha Stewart, Marc Jacobs and Jimmy Buffett.

In September 2011, Abramovich bought 16 Kensington Palace Gardens in London, a 15-bedroom mansion, for £90 million. He expanded the property to include an underground swimming pool.

In 2012, he paid £28 million for a six-story house in Eaton Square, Belgravia from Lily Safra.

Abramovich owns the Varsano boutique hotel in the Neve Tzedek neighbourhood of Tel Aviv, Israel, which he bought for 100 million NIS in 2015 from Gal Gadot's husband Yaron "Jaron" Varsano and his brother Guy Varsano, with plans to convert it to a residence.

In early 2018, Abramovich purchased four townhouses in the Upper East Side of Manhattan: 9, 11, 13 and 15 East 75th Street, paying $78 million for the first three houses and $29 million for the fourth. He planned to combine them into a megamansion that would measure 1,800 m^{2} (19,400 sq ft). However, he sold them to his ex-wife Dasha Zhukova for $91.4 million later that year.

In August 2018, Abramovich bought a triplex penthouse apartment in Chelsea, London for £30 million.

In January 2020, Abramovich purchased a property in Herzliya Pituah, Israel, for a record 226 million NIS.

As of 2022, he owned the Wildcat Ridge house, a 14,300-square-foot (1,330 m^{2}), 11-bedroom, 12-bath mansion on 200 acres near Snowmass Village, Colorado. He purchased it in 2008 for $36.375 million.

In September 2023, Abramovich allegedly bought a 2,000 square foot mansion on 96 hectares in Üsküdar, Istanbul, formerly owned by Adnan Oktar, for $18 million, with plans to renovate it and build a helipad. Abramovich has denied purchasing property in Turkey, although he is often seen there. Turkey has not sanctioned Russian entities.

=== Yachts ===
Abramovich maintains a fleet of yachts colloquially known as "Abramovich's Navy":

Current boats

- Eclipse (162.5 m (533 ft)) – Built in Germany by Blohm + Voss, she was launched in September 2009. Abramovich took delivery of the yacht in 2010. The yacht's interior and exterior were designed by Terence Disdale. Eclipse is believed to have cost Abramovich around US$400 million and was the world's largest privately owned yacht until 2013 when it was overtaken by 180 m (590 ft) Azzam. It includes at least two swimming pools, a cinema, two helicopter landing-pads, several on-board tenders, and a submarine that can be launched and dive to a depth of 49 m (160 ft). She is also equipped with armour plating surrounding the bridge and Abramovich's master suite, as well as bulletproof windows.
- Solaris (139.7-metre (458 ft)) - Built in 2021; moved to Turkish waters to avoid seizure due to sanctions.
- Garçon (67 m (220 ft)) - moored in Antigua; linked to Abramovich.

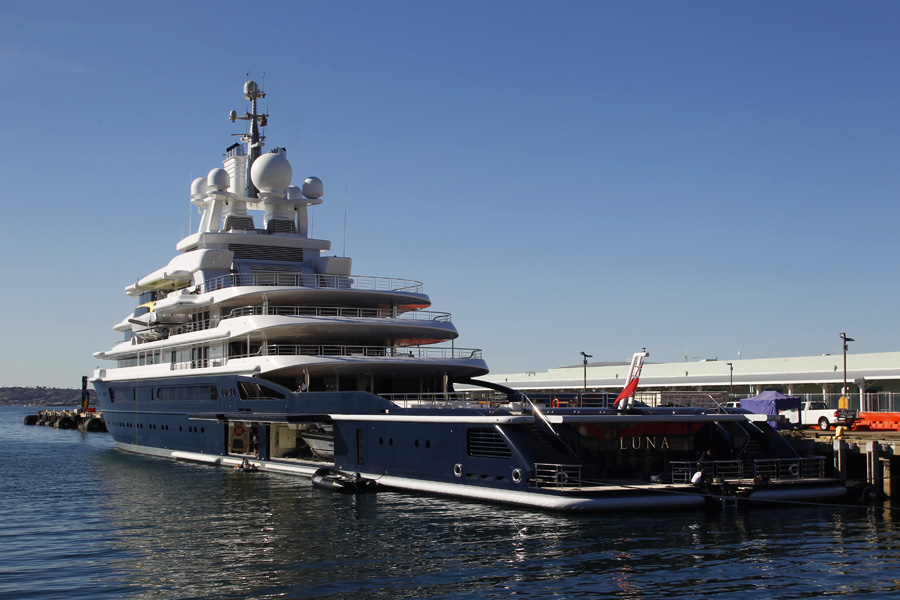
The world's second largest expedition yacht, Luna, seen docked in San Diego, January 2013. Sold to Farkhad Akhmedov in April 2014 for US$360 million.

Former boats

- Pelorus (115 m (377 ft)) – Built by Lürssen for Sheikh Abdul Mohsen Abdulmalik Al-Sheikh in 2003, original owner of M/Y Coral Island and M/Y Sussurro, who received six offers to sell her before she was even completed; Abramovich offered the highest bid. The interior was designed by Terence Disdale. The exterior was designed by Tim Heywood. Pelorus was refitted by Blohm + Voss in 2005 adding a new forward helipad and zero speed stabilisers. Given to ex-wife Irina in 2009 as part of the divorce settlement; David Geffen bought it for US$300 million in 2011. It was later sold to Samuel Tak Lee.
- Sussurro (49.5 m (162 ft)) – Built by Feadship in 1998 for Sheikh Abdul Mohsen Abdulmalik Al-Sheikh.
- Ecstasea (85 m (279 ft)) – Largest feadship. Built and launched in 2004 for Abramovich. She has a gas turbine alongside the conventional diesels which gives her high cruising speed. Abramovich sold the boat to Mohammed bin Zayed Al Nahyan in 2009 for $120 million.
- Le Grand Bleu (112 m (367 ft)) – Formerly owned by John McCaw; Abramovich bought the expedition yacht in 2003 and had her completely refitted by Blohm + Voss, including a 4.9 m (16 ft) swim platform and sports dock. He gifted the boat to Eugene Shvidler in June 2006.
- Luna (115 m (377 ft)) – Built by Lloyd Werft and delivered to Roman Abramovich in 2009 as an upgraded replacement for his Le Grand Bleu expedition yacht. Sold to Farkhad Akhmedov in April 2014 for US$360 million. Has a 1-million-litre (260,000 US gal) fuel tank, 7 engines outputting 15,000 hp (11,000 kW) propelling Luna to a maximum speed of 25 knots (46 km/h; 29 mph), 8 tenders, 15 cm (5.9 in) ice-class steel hull and 10 VIP Cabins.

=== Aircraft ===
In 2021, Ambramovich acquired a Boeing 787-8 Dreamliner.

In June 2022, the U.S. issued a warrant to seize Abramovich's Boeing 787-8 aircraft and Gulfstream G650ER due to sanctions and violation of the Export Control Reform Act of 2018.

==== Former aircraft ====
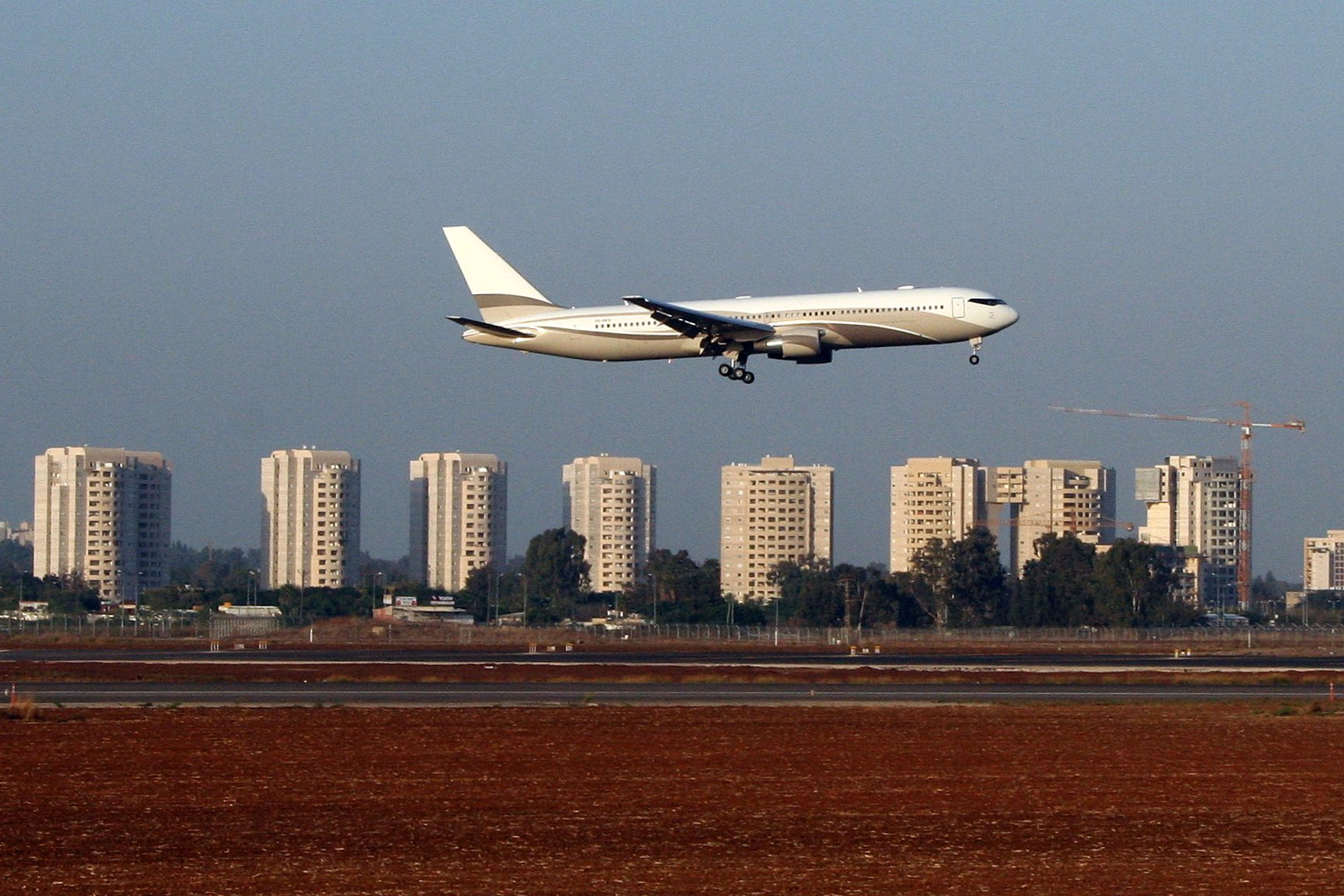
Abramovich's Boeing 767, The Bandit, landing at Ben Gurion Airport, Israel

In 2006, Abramovich bought a Boeing 767-33A/ER, registered in Aruba as P4-MES and known as The Bandit, for an estimated $300 million. Originally, the aircraft was ordered by Hawaiian Airlines, but the order was cancelled and Abramovich bought it from Boeing. Abramovich had it refitted to his own requirements by Andrew Winch, who designed the interior and exterior. Its interior includes a 30-seat dining room, a boardroom, master bedrooms, luxury bathrooms with showers and a living room. The aircraft has the same air missile avoidance system as Air Force One. Abramovich sold the plane in 2021.

=== Art collection ===
Abramovich has an art collection of over 300 pieces estimated to be worth $963 million as of 2023. It includes pieces by Claude Monet, Piet Mondrian, Henri Matisse, Pablo Picasso, Natalia Goncharova, Vera Rockline and René Magritte.

In May 2008, Abramovich purchased Francis Bacon's Triptych 1976 for €61.4 million (US$86.3 million), a record price for a post-war work of art, and Lucian Freud's Benefits Supervisor Sleeping for €23.9 million (US$33.6 million), a record price for a work by a living artist.

== In popular culture ==
Abramovich is a central character in Peter Morgan's 2022 play Patriots, dramatising the life of Boris Berezovsky.

== See also ==
- List of Jews born in the Russian Empire and the Soviet Union
- List of Jews in sports (non-players)
- List of people and organizations sanctioned during the Russo-Ukrainian War
- List of Russian billionaires
- Russian oligarchs
- Superprovisional measure

== Notes ==
Government offices
Preceded by Aleksandr Nazarov	Governor of Chukotka; 2000 – 2008	Succeeded by Roman Kopin
Political offices
Preceded by Vladimir Babichev	Member of the State Duma from Chukotka constituency 2000	Succeeded by Vladimir Yetylin
