= Arkadiy Abramovich =

Russian businessman (born 1993)

- Аркадий Абрамович
- Born: Arkadiy Romanovich Abramovich; 14 September 1993 (age 33); Moscow, Russia
- Citizenship: Russian, Lithuanian
- Occupation: Businessman
- Years active: 2011–present
- Father: Roman Abramovich

Arkadiy Romanovich Abramovich (born 14 September 1993) is a Russian-born billionaire businessman heir who is the owner of ARA Capital, a private investment company.

== Early life and family ==
Abramovich is one of five children born to Russian billionaire Roman Abramovich and former Aeroflot stewardess Irina Abramovich (née Malandina). His parents divorced in 2007. He has one brother, Ilya, and three sisters: Arina, Sofia, and Anna. Arkadiy also has two younger half-siblings: Aaron and Leah Lou.

== Career ==
Arkadiy Abramovich is the founder and owner of ARA Capital, a private investment vehicle whose assets include Zoltav Resources PLC. Until February 2022, Zoltav was listed on the London Stock Exchange's Alternative Investment Market under the ticker symbol ZOL. Through ARA Capital, Abramovich also bought a 26% stake in Crosby Asset Management. In 2010, it was widely reported that Arkadiy made a bid for leading Danish football team FC Copenhagen; however, no bid materialised.

In 2013, Arkadiy started working as an intern at the London office of Russian, VTB Bank. During the same year, he bought a 45% share in the shell company Zoltav Resources, and purchased a stake in an oil field in Siberia for a reported $46 million. $26 million of the $46 million were funneled through Zoltav to purchase CenGeo Holdings - owner of the undeveloped Koltogor oil field in Western Siberia. The remaining $20 million were pledged by ARA Capital to fund the field's development in return for more shares.

In 2014, Zoltav completed the acquisition of Royal Atlantic Energy (Cyprus) Limited and began trading on the London Stock Exchange's Alternative Investment Market (AIM) department. Zoltav also purchased a full license for gas exploration, extraction and production in the Bortovoy area of Saratov Oblast. Bortovoy contains several active gas fields, 750 billion cubic feet of substantiated gas reserves, 3.9 million barrels of condensate, and a processing plant.

In 2015, Arkadiy founded a company called Greenhouse, specializing in vegetable farming. Though the value of the investment remains undisclosed, reports note that the farming venture would focus on growing cucumbers and tomatoes in the Belgorod region, 700 km south of Moscow. According to authorities in the Rostov region, earlier the same year Abramovich Jr. began planning a major investment (approx. $700 million) in greenhouse development in the region. The terms are still under negotiation. In 2017, it was reported that Arkadiy had offered €250 million to purchase a controlling stake in CSKA Moscow.

In January 2022, Arkadiy consolidated 98.91% of Zoltav Resources stock under ARA Capital control, following a buyback from minor shareholders and Bandbear Ltd. A month later Zoltav Resources delisted from the London Stock Exchange.

== Offshore trust and Lithuanian citizenship ==
In early 2022, offshore trusts holding billions of Roman Abramovich's assets were amended to transfer beneficial ownership to his seven children, including Arkadiy. At the time of this transfer, Arkadiy held Lithuanian citizenship. Documents from the Cyprus Confidential leak included a scanned copy of Arkadiy's Lithuanian passport. Holding Lithuanian citizenship at the time of the transfer was considered to have helped shield some of Abramovich's assets from sanctions, as his children became the new beneficiaries. In 2023, Lithuania has proposed new legislation to allow stripping citizenship for national security reasons, in response to Arkadiy and another of Abramovich's children, Anna, holding Lithuanian passports.
