= Northgas =

- Type: private
- Industry: Natural gas
- Founded: 1993
- Headquarters: Russia
- Key people: Vyacheslav Kramarovsky (Director General)
- Revenue: 23,079,100,000 Russian ruble (2017)
- Owner: Gazprom; Novatek
- Website: www.northgas.ru

ZAO Northgas (Russian: ЗАО Нортгаз) is a natural gas-producing company in Russia. It is a developer of the North-Urengoy (Severo-Urengoyskoye) gas field in the Yamalo-Nenets region. According to DeGolyer and MacNaughton, it controls a total reserves of 368 billion cubic metres of natural gas. All produced gas is acquired by Gazprom.

== History ==
Northgas was founded in 1993 to develop the North-Urengoy field. The company was controlled by Gazprom through its subsidiary Urengoygazprom, which owned a 51% stake in Northgas. 44% of the company was owned by Bechtel Energy, while Tansley, an offshore company owned by the Azerbaijani businessman Farkhad Akhmedov had a stake of 5%. A license for the North-Urengoy field was transferred from Urengoygazprom to Northgas in 1994. In 1996, Bechtel sold its stake to Akhmedov-owned Farcot Group, which later also took over a stake owned by Transley. In 1999–2001, Farkhad Akhmedov gained full control over Northgas through the three emissions of additional shares and signing-off the existing share capital. Its ownership was transferred to the holding company REDI.

Northgas started natural gas production in 2001. However, due to a dispute with Gazprom, the access of produced gas to the gas transportation system of Russia was limited and the Northgas license of the North-Urengoy field was annulled. In 2005, the dispute was resolved by Gazprom acquiring a 51% stake in Northgas free of charge. Gazprom owns its stake through Urengoygazprom.

A new dispute between the Farkhad Akhmedov's holding company REDI and Gazprom arose in 2008 over a gas price and access to the gas transportation system.

In January 2011, a Russian power producer Inter RAO announced that it will acquire REDI, which holds 49% take in Northgas for US$1.5 billion. Inter RAO made similar offer to Gazprom to acquire a full control of the company. However, this transaction was not completed. In 2012, the stake owned by REDI was acquired by Novatek for $1.4 billion. In 2013, Gazprom transferred additional 1% of shares to Novatek and two companies became equal partners.
