= Alexander Zhukov (businessman) =

Russian businessman (born 1954)

- Александр Жуков
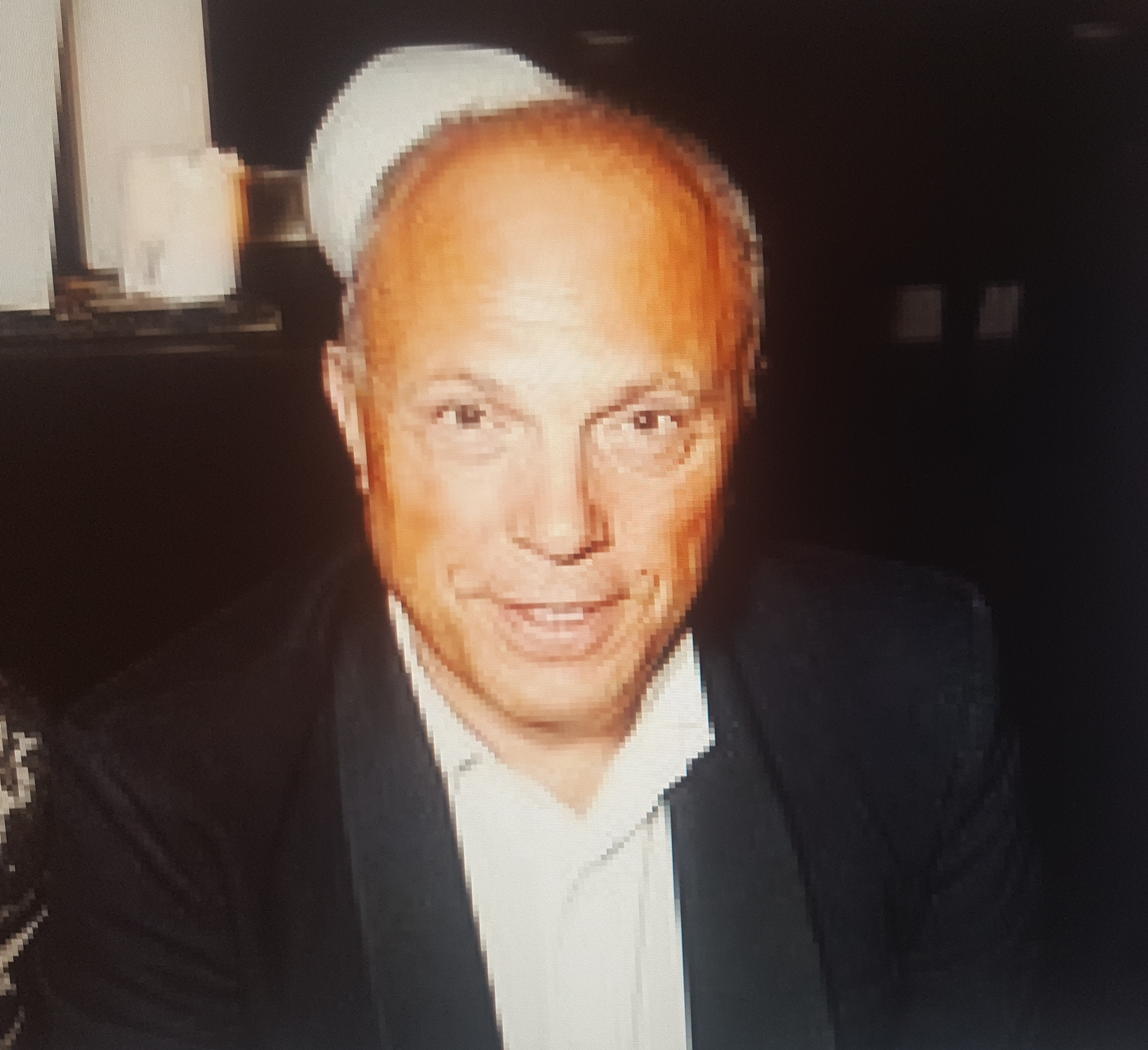
- Born: Alexander Borisovich Rabkin; 13 June 1954 (age 72); Moscow, Russian SFSR, Soviet Union
- Education: Moscow State University
- Spouse: Yelena Zhukova (div.)
- Children: 3, including Dasha Zhukova

Alexander Borisovich Zhukov (Russian: Александр Борисович Жуков; born 13 June 1954) is a Russian-born British businessman. He is the founder and major owner of the international investment group Interfinance, investing in port and transport infrastructure, food industry and real estate, as well as engaged in portfolio investments. The assets of Interfinance group currently include transshipment port terminals (sulphur, mineral fertilizers and other bulk cargo, vehicles) in Russia and Ukraine, Iceberry group of companies - the Russian ice-cream producer and distributor, development projects in Russia and Ukraine, road construction business and insurance business in Ukraine.

== Biography ==
Zhukov was born in 1954 in Moscow. His father, Shayaborg (Boris) Rabkin, was a playwright and writer, and his mother, Inessa Rabkina, was an editor at the Moscow film studio. Alexander Zhukov is related to Georgy Zhukhov, the marshal who led the Red Army in the Second World War. Zhukov gives a lot of money to the Russian Orthodox Church and he restores churches. After graduating from school, he worked as an assistant to a film director at the Moscow film studio "Tsentrnauchfilm". In 1981, he graduated as specialist in Eastern languages from the Institute of Asian and African Studies under the Moscow State University. After graduation, he worked as editor at "Sovinterfest" (a division of the Goskino organizing exhibitions and festivals).

In the late 1980s, he started his business activity. Zhukov has resided in London since 1993. In 2001, he became a British citizen.

In 2001, Zhukov was arrested in Italy and spent several months under arrest on suspicion of being engaged in arms smuggling from Ukraine to the states of former Yugoslavia. Subject to legal documents, Zhukov was charged of "moral complicity". A report titled Ukrainian Organized Crime compiled by Italian police in October 1998, obtained by reporters from Washington-based International Consortium of Investigative Journalists, refers to Zhukov as a member of organized crime group "Odesa Oil Mafia." In 2004, Zhukov was absolved from the offences of "moral complicity" in arms trading, because (as was stated in court decision) the offences, for which he was charged, did not occur.

According to Institutional Investor, Zhukov was a client of a Jersey-based offshore trust company La Hougue which engaged in tax minimisation through legal loopholes and other avoidance measures.

=== Family ===
Zhukov met his first wife while both were students in Moscow and was married for three years until 1984 to a member of the Moscow intelligentsia, the Russian-Jewish molecular biologist Yelena Zhukova (born 1957 or 1958), who emigrated to the United States in 1991 only two months before the collapse of the Soviet Union and, in 2024, remarried media mogul Rupert Murdoch. He has one daughter, Darya "Dasha" Zhukova (born 1981), and two sons: Mikhail Zhukov and Boris Zhukov. Through his daughter Dasha, who was married to oil oligarch Roman Abramovich, he has a grandson, Aaron Abramovich (born 2009), and a granddaughter, Leah Abramovich (born 2013). In March 2021 his third grandchild, Philip Stavros Niarchos, was born after his daughter's wedding to Stavros Niarchos II, the grandson of a Greek shipping tycoon and son of Philip Niarchos.

== Business activity ==
In the late 1980s, Zhukov founded the cooperative "Byte" and started the business of selling personal computers.

In the early 1990s, jointly with his acquaintances Leonid Lebedev and Mark Garber, he founded the cooperative named "Sintez". (Note: Lebedev was looking for where to get oil, Zhukov was looking for whom and how (logistics) to sell it, and Garber was responsible for relations with government agencies. "Zhukov has very good business brains, he is a very good trader," stated Garber.) In 1991-1992, Sintez started to trade oil and oil products.

In 1992, Sintez founded a company named "Negusneft" that acquired a license to explore and develop a small Varyngskoe field in the Khanty-Mansi Autonomous District. Also, Sintez acquired 10% share in "Nizhnevartovskneftegaz" (the core of the future company TNK), 15% in "Rosneft-Sakhalinmorneftegaz" and 15% in the Yaroslavl Oil Processing Plant. In 1997, the group's turnover reached US$1.5 billion.

In 1993, the group began to cooperate with the Odesa Oil Processing Plant. At the same time the group were making investments to the port development. The investments amounted to US$100 million. By the end of the nineties the capacity of the oil intake, storage and transshipment facility reached 25 million tons per year.

Sintez transshipped oil through the Odesa port terminal and arranged for oil trading in the international market through its traders located in the UK, Switzerland and Finland.

In 1995, the group acquired a Ukrainian bank which later became Marine Transport Bank. Initially its operations were limited to the processing of the group's transactions but later it expanded its operations and started to service public agencies and enterprises in the Odesa Region.

In the late 1990s, the Sintez business partners decided to divide the business. The transshipment business and the bank in Ukraine passed to Zhukov, while the Russian assets - to Lebedev.

In 1998, Zhukov started to cooperate with Lukoil. A joint venture "Luk-Sintez Oil" was established to supply the Lukoil-produced oil. In 1999, the company acquired the Odesa Oil Processing Plant. In 2000, Zhukov sold his share in the company to Lukoil.

In the beginning of 2000, Zhukov consolidated his transshipment business in Ukraine under the Transit brand. Later in 2001-2002, the business was sold.

In 2004, Marine Transport Bank was sold.

After the sale of the transshipment business and bank Alexander Zhukov focused on investing in Russia. The Interfinance group was founded with "Interfinance SA", Switzerland as the headquarter company. The group invested in various sectors such as port infrastructure, oil and oil extraction, food industry, portfolio loans, construction, including road construction, development, land assets, portfolio investments.

=== Key projects of the Interfinance group ===
In 2003-2007, Zhukov jointly with Ziyavudin Magomedov and Boris Davletyarov conducted successfully portfolio investments in the Gazprom, Sberbank and Transneft shares.

In 2004, Zhukov acquired a considerable lot of shares in a UK oil and gas company - JKX Oil & Gas plc. through his corporate vehicle "Glengary Overseas Ltd". In 2007, he sold a part of his stake to the structures owned by Ihor Kolomoyskyi. At the time the entities of Zhukov and Kolomoisky were the two major shareholders in JKX. In 2009-2010, the shares in JKX lost 1/3 in value and in the next two years the loss in value reached 80%. In 2013, the major shareholders attempted to change the management of the company, however the directors then in office attempted not to allow the same stating that the two shareholders were acting in concert. In spite of being informed by the shareholders to the contrary JKX nevertheless decided to restrict the shareholders' voting rights claiming the information provided being incorrect. The shareholders initiated court proceedings to protect their rights. The proceedings went through all of the three instances in the UK. At the end of 2015 the Supreme Court of the UK finally resolved the matter by holding that JKX by restricting the shareholders' rights had acted with improper purpose, namely, with a view to influence on the outcome of the voting at the general meeting (and not with a view to encourage the shareholders to provide information). However, the issue of whether the shareholders were acting in concert and the nature of arrangements between them was not the subject of the dispute and was neither reviewed nor assessed by the court.

In 2005, the group acquired the Ice-Fili ice-cream production and sale business later reorganized into Iceberry group of companies. Interfinance continues to own and develop this business.

In 2005, Zhukov started transport logistics business in Russia. He acquired a site and built a bulk cargo (sulfur) transshipment terminal at the port of Ust-Luga, Russia. Currently the construction of the second stage - a mineral fertilizer transshipment terminal - is being finalized.

In 2007, the Interfinance group sold its Russian gas asset – the Koshekhablskoe field in Adygeya to JKX.

Early in 2016, Glengary sold its shares in JKX and Zhukov ceased to be a shareholder therein.
