= 2023 Chukotka Autonomous Okrug gubernatorial election =

← 2018	8–10 September 2023	2028 →
- Turnout: 53.42%
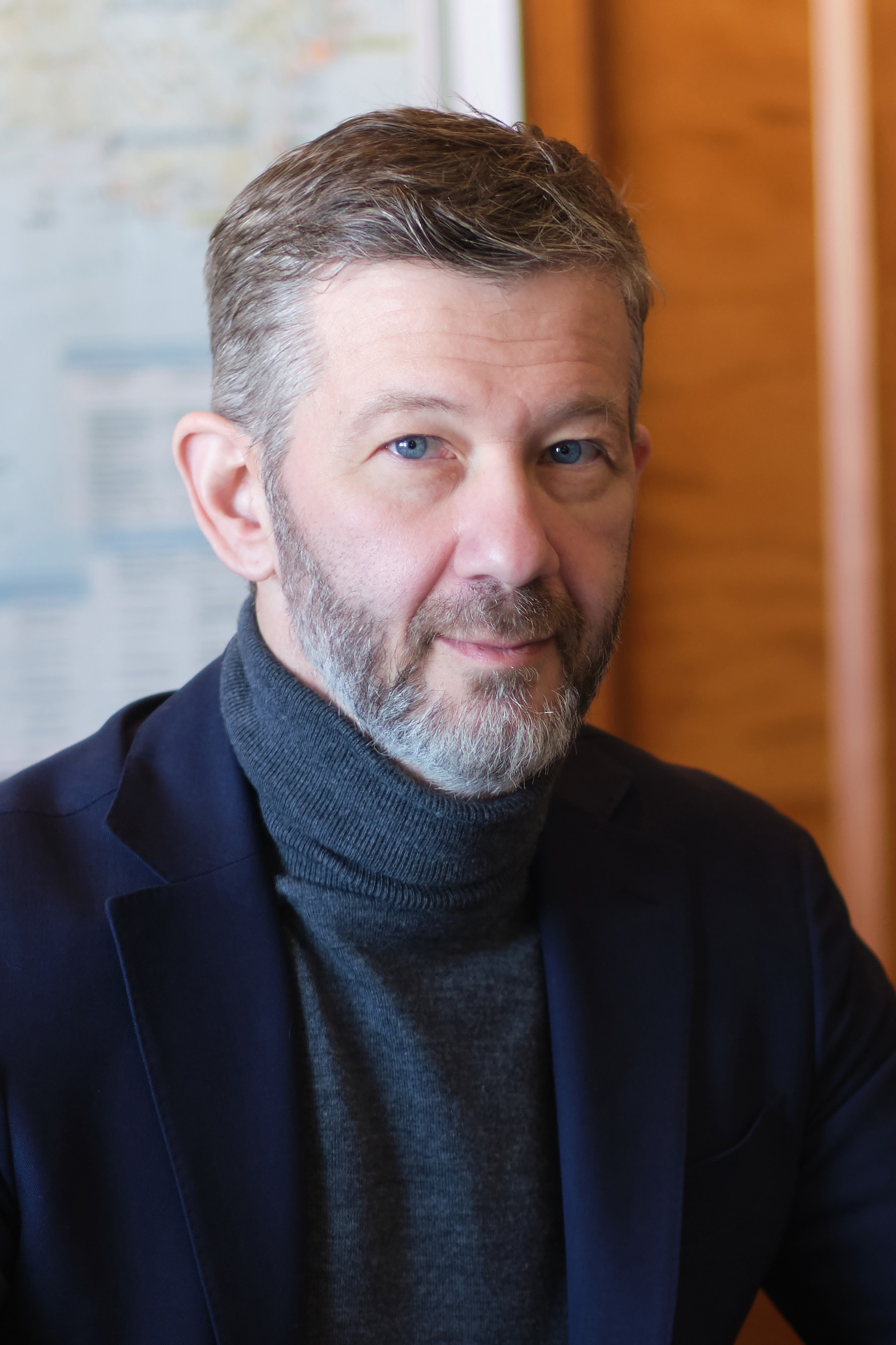
		LDPR	CPRF
Candidate	Vladislav Kuznetsov	Yulia Butakova	Vladimir Galtsov
Party	United Russia	LDPR	CPRF
Popular vote	11,541	2,527	835
Percentage	72.34%	15.84%	5.23%
- Results by raions and cities
Governor before election
Vladislav Kuznetsov (acting)
United Russia
Elected Governor
Vladislav Kuznetsov
United Russia

The 2023 Chukotka Autonomous Okrug gubernatorial election took place on 8–10 September 2023, on common election day. Acting Governor Vladislav Kuznetsov was elected for a full term.

== Background ==
In July 2008 then-Governor of Chukotka Autonomous Okrug Roman Abramovich asked for his resignation, which was approved by President Dmitry Medvedev, who in turn appointed Deputy Governor Roman Kopin as Abramovich's replacement. A week later Kopin was unanimously elected to the position by members of Duma of Chukotka Autonomous Okrug. After direct gubernatorial election were returned in 2012, Kopin won reelection to his second term in 2013 with 79.84% of the vote. Kopin won election to his third term in 2018 with just 57.83% losing to LDPR candidate Yulia Butakova in okrug's capital Anadyr and nearly triggering a runoff.

By 2023 Roman Kopin led the remote region for 14 years, second-longest to Head of Chechnya Ramzan Kadyrov. The length of Kopin's gubernatorial tenure and lack of notable accomplishments, coupled with gradual withdrawal of Roman Abramovich from politics, led to speculations about governor's possible resignation. In early 2023 the governor was rumoured to be considering not running for a fourth term in office and eventual retirement. On 15 March Roman Kopin asked President Vladimir Putin for resignation, which was granted. Putin then appointed First Deputy Prime Minister of Lugansk People's Republic Vladislav Kuznetsov, a former Sibur executive, as acting Governor of Chukotka Autonomous Okrug.

== Candidates ==
In Chukotka Autonomous Okrug candidates for Governor can be nominated only by registered political parties, self-nomination is not possible. However, candidates are not obliged to be members of the nominating party. Candidate for Governor of Chukotka Autonomous Okrug should be a Russian citizen and at least 30 years old. Candidates for Governor should not have a foreign citizenship or residence permit. Each candidate in order to be registered is required to collect at least 9% of signatures of members and heads of municipalities (28 signatures). Also gubernatorial candidates present 3 candidacies to the Federation Council and election winner later appoints one of the presented candidates.

=== Registered ===
- Yulia Butakova (LDPR), Member of Duma of the Chukotka Autonomous Okrug (2016–present), 2018 gubernatorial candidate
- Vladimir Galtsov (CPRF), Member of Duma of the Chukotka Autonomous Okrug (2016–2019, 2021–present), 2018 gubernatorial candidate
- Vladislav Kuznetsov (United Russia), acting Governor of Chukotka Autonomous Okrug (2023–present), former First Deputy Prime Minister of Lugansk People's Republic (2022–2023)
- Aleksandr Semerikov (SR–ZP), director of Russian Post regional office

=== Eliminated at United Russia convention ===
- Sergey Kolyadko, Member of Anadyr Council of Deputies (2014–present)
- Lyubov Makhayeva, Member of Duma of the Chukotka Autonomous Okrug (2016–present)

=== Declined ===
- Anton Lobanov (SR–ZP), Member of Duma of the Chukotka Autonomous Okrug (2021–present), journalist

=== Candidates for Federation Council ===
- Yulia Butakova (LDPR):
  - Natalya Antonova, economist
  - Natalya Perfilyeva, chief accountant of Anadyrsky District social service institutions
  - Olga Vedutenko, Head of the Public Procurement Organisation Department of the Duma of the Chukotka Autonomous Okrug Apparatus
- Vladimir Galstov (CPRF):
  - Anna Pershina, veterinarian
  - Semyon Vereshchagin, Rosdgvardiya captain
  - Yelena Yarygina, aide to State Duma member Nikolay Kharitonov
- Vladislav Kuznetsov (United Russia):
  - Nadezhda Grebtsova, chairwoman of the United Russia regional office executive committee
  - Pyotr Klimov, Member of Duma of the Chukotka Autonomous Okrug (2001–2006, 2016–present)
  - Anna Otke, incumbent Senator from Chukotka Autonomous Okrug (2013–present)
- Aleksandr Semerikov (SR–ZP):
  - Ksenia Beryozkina, Russian Post cashier
  - Marina Koshchegulova, Sberbank employee
  - Anna Lobanova, Deputy Chief of Staff of the Duma of the Chukotka Autonomous Okrug

== Finances ==
All sums are in rubles.

Financial Report	Source	Butakova	Galtsov	Kuznetsov	Semerikov
First		510,000	90,000	1,860,000	100,000
Final		1,510,000	270,000	11,410,000	449,500

== Results ==
Summary of the 8–10 September 2023 Chukotka Autonomous Okrug gubernatorial election results
Candidate	Party	Votes	%
Vladislav Kuznetsov (incumbent)	United Russia	11,541	72.34
Yulia Butakova	Liberal Democratic Party	2,527	15.84
Vladimir Galtsov	Communist Party	835	5.23
Aleksandr Semerikov	A Just Russia — For Truth	661	4.14
Valid votes		15,564	97.56
Blank ballots		390	2.44
Total		15,954	100.00
Turnout		15,954	53.42
Registered voters		29,865	100.00

Governor Kuznetsov re-appointed incumbent Senator Anna Otke (United Russia) to the Federation Council.

== See also ==
- 2023 Russian regional elections
