= Shalaurov =

Shalaurov may refer to:

- Nikita Shalaurov, a Russian merchant and Arctic explorer
- Shalaurov Island, in the East Siberian Sea
