= 1996 Chukotka gubernatorial election =

- 22 December 1996
- Turnout: 59.42%
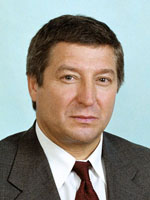

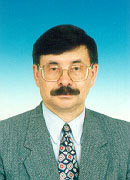
Candidate	Aleksandr Nazarov	Vladimir Yetylin
Party	NDR	Independent
Popular vote	20,580	6,644
Percentage	65.18%	21.04%
- Results by district
Governor before election
Aleksandr Nazarov
NDR
Elected Governor
Aleksandr Nazarov
NDR

Elections for the governor of the Chukotka Autonomous Okrug took place on 22 December 1996. Aleksandr Nazarov won the election with 65.18% of votes, with former People's Deputy of the USSR Vladimir Yetylin in second place, receiving 21.04% of the vote.

== Candidates ==
- Yuri Broytman, entrepreneur
- Aleksandr Nazarov, governor of Chukotka Autonomous Okrug (1991–present), Chairman of the Chukotka Autonomous Okrug Executive Committee (1990–91)
- Aleksandr Popov, entrepreneur
- Sergey Povodyr, chairman of the Duma of Chukotka Autonomous Okrug (1994–present)
- Vladimir Yetylin, head of laboratory at "Chukotka" Research Center, chairman of the Council of People's Deputies of Chukotka Autonomous Okrug (1990–93)

== Results ==
Results
Party	Candidate	Votes	%
1.	Aleksandr Nazarov	20,580	65.18%
2.	Vladimir Yetylin	6,644	21.04%
3.	Yuri Broytman	729	2.31%
4.	Sergey Povodyr	64	0.21%
5.	Aleksandr Popov	55	0.18%
6.	Against all	2,763	8.75%
Valid votes		30,835	97.67%
Invalid/blank votes		797	2.33%
Total		31,632	100%
Eligible voters/turnout		53,235	59.42%

== Sources ==
- Центральная избирательная комиссия; В.Н. Козлов; Д.Б. Орешкин; А.Н. Платэ (1997). Выборы глав исполнительной власти субъектов Российской Федерации, 1995-1997 (in Russian). Издательство "Весь Мир". ISBN 978-5-7777-0036-0.
- "Губернаторские выборы - 1996". Политика.
