= Anna Otke =

Russian politician

- Анна Отке
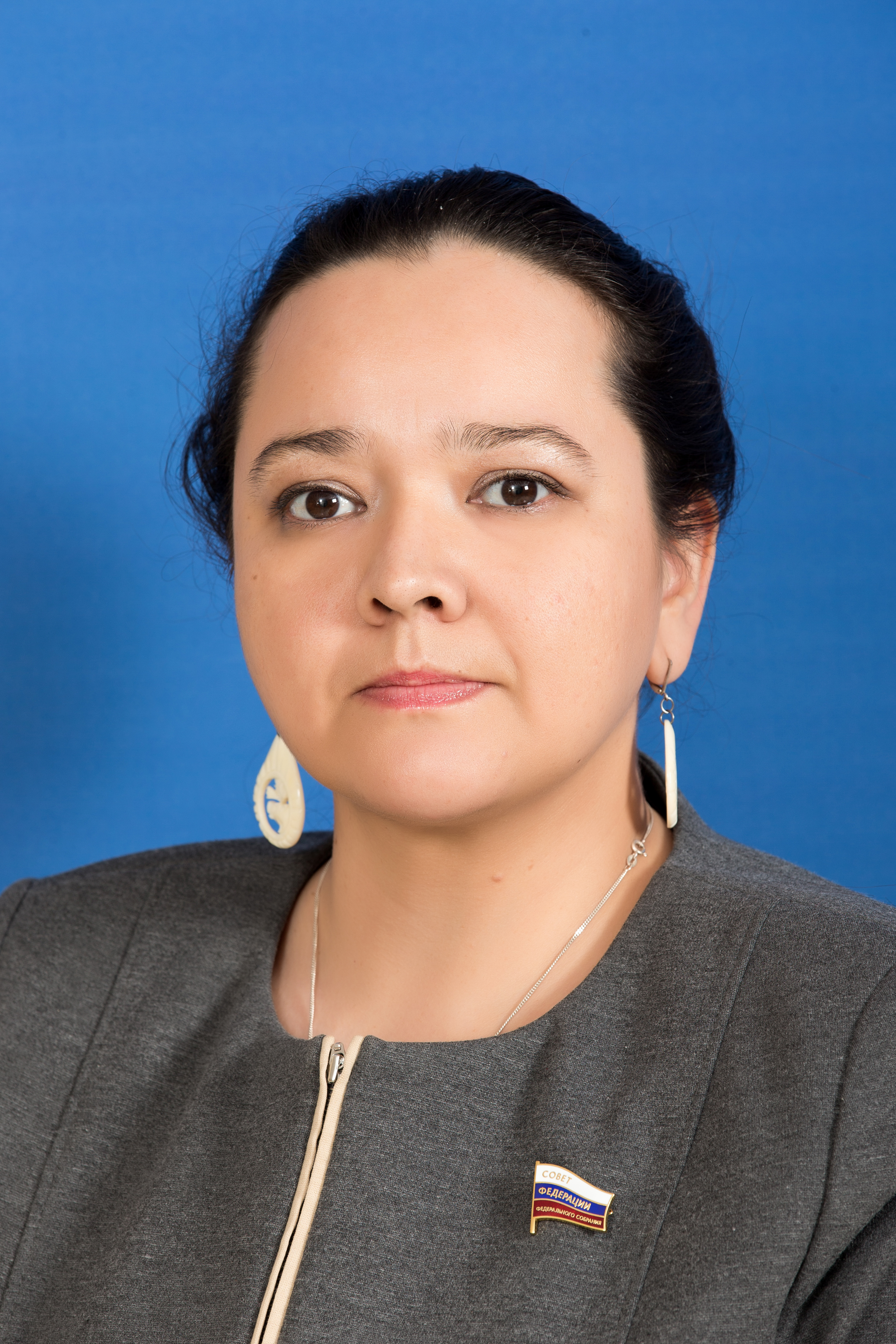
- Official portrait, 2013

Russian Federation Senator from the Chukotka Autonomous Okrug
- Incumbent
- Assumed office 25 September 2013
- Preceded by: Larisa Ponomaryova

Personal details
- Born: Anna Ivanovna Otke; 21 December 1974 (age 51) Anadyr, Russian SFSR, Soviet Union
- Party: United Russia

Anna Ivanovna Otke (Russian: Анна Ивановна Отке; born 21 December 1974) is a Russian politician, who is a member of the Federation Council of Chukotka Autonomous Okrug on executive authority since 25 September 2013.

Since 9 March 2022, she has been under personal EU sanctions.

== Biography ==
Anna Otke was born on 21 December 1974. In 1997, she graduated with a bachelor's degree, and in 1999, with a master's degree at the Department of International Law of the Peoples' Friendship University of Russia. She has a PhD in law, with the thesis topic "International Legal Aspects of Environmental Security of the CIS Member States".

From 2005 to 2009, she worked in the apparatus of the governor and government of the Chukotka Autonomous Okrug as the chief specialist of the department for the affairs of indigenous peoples of the region.

Between 2009 and 2013, she worked as a social development manager at ZAO Chukotka Mining and Geological Company.

Since 2011, she has been the president of the regional public organization "Association of Indigenous Peoples of Chukotka".

On 26 September 2013, the elected governor of Chukotka, Roman Kopin, appointed Otke as the representative of the region's executive power in the Federation Council.

=== Sanctions ===
She was sanctioned by the UK government in 2022 in relation to the Russo-Ukrainian War.
