= Anthem of the Chukotka Autonomous Okrug =

Гимн Чукотского автономного округа
English: Anthem of the Chukotka Autonomous Okrug
- Coat of arms of Chukotka Autonomous Okrug
- Regional anthem of Chukotka Autonomous Okrug
- Lyrics: K.N. Kelena-Zorina, 2000
- Music: K.N. Kelena-Zorina, 2000
- Adopted: 4 October 2000

The anthem of the Chukotka Autonomous Okrug (Russian: гимн Чукотского автономного округа) is one of the state symbols of the Chukotka Autonomous Okrug—a federal subject of Russia—along with its flag and coat of arms. The anthem was written and composed by Kelena-Zorina, and it was officially adopted on 4 October 2000.

== Lyrics ==
Russian original

Родина моя, омытая морями
Недрами богатая земля.
Здесь живёт народ со всей страны великой
Как одна надёжная семья.

Припев:
Тундра! Бескрайняя тундра. Чукотка!
Реки-кристальной воды Чукотка!
Горы, озера, равнины Чукотка!
Славим просторы твои!

Солнца яркий луч красит гор вершины,
Первым озаряя флаг страны.
Это край Чукотский, часть большой России
Прославляем всей душою мы!

Припев

Russian Latin alphabet

Rodina moja, omytaja morjami
Nedrami bogataja zemlja.
Zdesj živjot narod so vsej strany velikoj
Kak odna nadjožnaja semia.

Pripev:
Tundra! Beskrajnjaja tundra. Čukotka!
Reki-kristaljnoj vody Čukotka!
Gory, ozera, ravniny Čukotka!
Slavim prostory tvoi!

Solnca jarkij luč krasit gor veršiny,
Pervym ozarjaja flag strany.
Eto kraj Čukotskij, častj boljšoj Rossii
Proslavljajem vsej dušoju my!

Pripev

English translation

Homeland of mine, washed by the seas,
This land rich in minerals.
Folks all over the great country
Live here as one reliable family.

Chorus:
Tundra! Endless tundra! Chukotka!
Crystal-clear rivers of Chukotka!
Mountains, lakes and plains of Chukotka!
Glory to thine open spaces!

A bright sunbeam paints the mountain peaks,
First illuminating the country's flag.
This land of Chukotka, part of great Russia,
Glory to thee from all of us!

Chorus

Chukchi translation

Эйгысӄынутэтэ рычеэкэвыркынинэт
Вараттэ эйгысӄыйиквикинэт.
Мэчыӄэрга – айгысӄийӈа
Рыӄитпэвыркынин вараттэ.

Припев:
Чукотка – Урэтнутэйгыт!
Мэчыӄэргатыркын эйгысӄын, ильуткугйит мытлеркын ыттъыёлягты!
Эйгысӄыныкирит рытавыркынэн аӄагнэъылёта,
Ӄитпэвыркыт оравэтльат.

Мыггаймычьыльын мургин нутэнут,
Ынӄэнат гэйыле анӄата, нутэтэ.
Гырорьок нутэйиквин нывтатӄэн,
Танпэраркын мургин Урэтнутэнут.

Припев

Ӈотӄо эргыръоркын Россия.
Ӈутку рэнамынгаймэты тэнтумгэ.
Ӈутку ымваӈэт гавалёма: чеэкэ – этъопэл!
Нэнчеэкэвмык ымыльо Эйгысӄынутэтэ.

Припев

Chukchi transliteration

Eigysḳynutete rycēkewyrkyninet
Waratte eigysḳyjikwikinet.
Mecyḳerga – aigysḳīṇa
Ryḳitpewyrkynin waratte.

Pripew:
Cukotka – Uretnuteigyt!
Mecyḳergatyrkyn eigysḳyn, il’utkugjit mytlerkyn ytt’yjoljagty!
Eigysḳynykirit rytawyrkynen aḳagne’yljota,
Ḳitpewyrkyt orawetl’at.

Myggaimyc’yl’yn murgin nutenut,
Ynḳenat gejyle anḳata, nutete.
Gyror’ok nutejikwin nywtatḳen,
Tanperarkyn murgin Uretnutenut.

Pripew

Ṇotḳo ergyr’orkyn Rossia.
Ṇutku renamyngaimety tentumge.
Ṇutku ymwaṇet gawaljoma: cēke – et’olpel!
Nencēkewmyk ymyl’o Eigysḳynutete.

Pripew
