= Larisa Ponomaryova =

Russian stateswoman

- Лариса Пономарёва

Russian Federation Senator from the Chukotka Autonomous Okrug
- In office 23 March 2005 – 25 September 2013
- Preceded by: Aleksandr Nazarov
- Succeeded by: Anna Otke

Personal details
- Born: Larisa Nikolayevna Ponomaryova; 1 July 1949 (age 77) Altai Krai, RSFSR, Soviet Union
- Spouse: Vladimir Ponomarev
- Children: Ilya Ponomarev

Larisa Nikolayevna Ponomaryova (Russian: Лариса Николаевна Пономарёва; born 1 July 1949) is a Russian politician. She is a former representative of the government of the Chukotka Autonomous Okrug in the Federation Council, serving from 2005 to 2013.

== Early life ==
Ponomaryova was born on 1 July 1949. She graduated from the Moscow Institute of Electronic Engineering.

== Career ==
From 2000 to 2001, she worked as an assistant to State Duma member Roman Abramovich. After his election as governor of the Chukotka Autonomous Region, Ponomaryova was appointed head of the secretariat of the apparatus of the governor and the government of the autonomous region. She was directly involved in resolving issues coming through the governor's hotline, and also supervised the resettlement of residents to other regions.

On 23 March 2005, Ponomaryova entered the Federation Council as a representative of the executive authority of the Chukotka Autonomous Okrug. In the Federation Council, she was a member of the Committee on Social Policy from April 2005 to April 2006, then the First Deputy Chairman of the Committee on Social Policy from April 2006 to January 2008, First Deputy Chairman of the Committee on Social Policy and Healthcare from January 2008 to November 2011, and Member of the Commission on Youth Affairs and Tourism from November 2008 to November 2011. In November 2011, she again became First Deputy Chairman of the Social Policy Committee.

She departed from the Federation Council in September 2013. She was replaced by Anna Otke.

She was awarded an honorary diploma of the Federation Council.

== Personal life ==
She is married to Doctor of Physical and Mathematical Sciences Vladimir Ponomarev, (born in 1945). Their son, Ilya Ponomarev, is a former member of the State Duma of the 5th and 6th convocations from the A Just Russia party. Ilya, the only member of the State Duma to vote against Russia's annexation of Crimea, went into exile in 2014. After the start of 2022 Russian invasion of Ukraine, she moved to Warsaw with her husband.
