= Governor of Chukotka Autonomous Okrug =

Highest-ranking official in Chukotka Autonomous Okrug, Russia

- Coat of arms of Chukotka

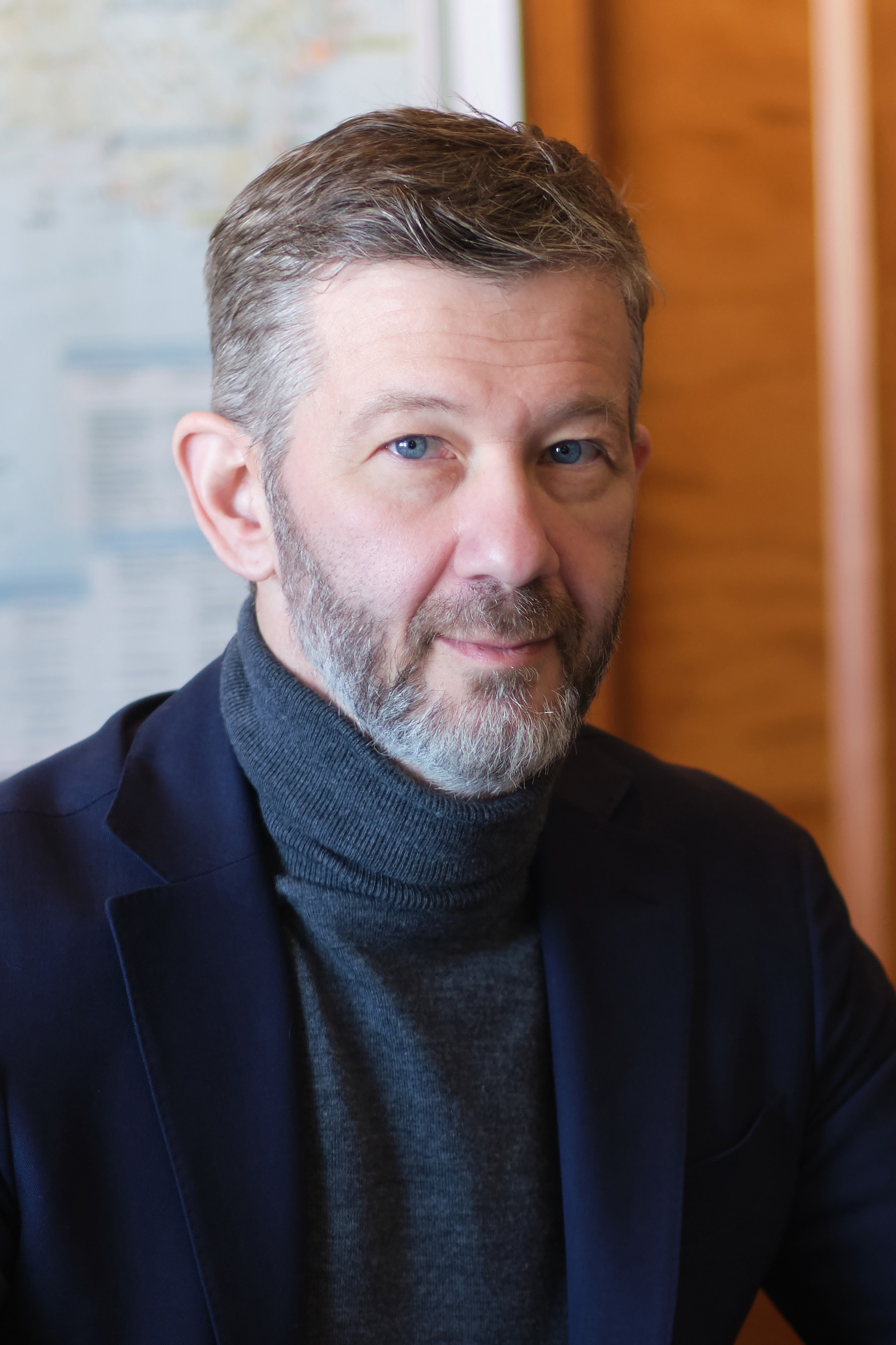
- Incumbent; Vladislav Kuznetsov since 15 March 2023
- Seat: Anadyr
- Term length: 5 years
- Inaugural holder: Aleksandr Nazarov
- Formation: 1991
- Website: чукотка.рф

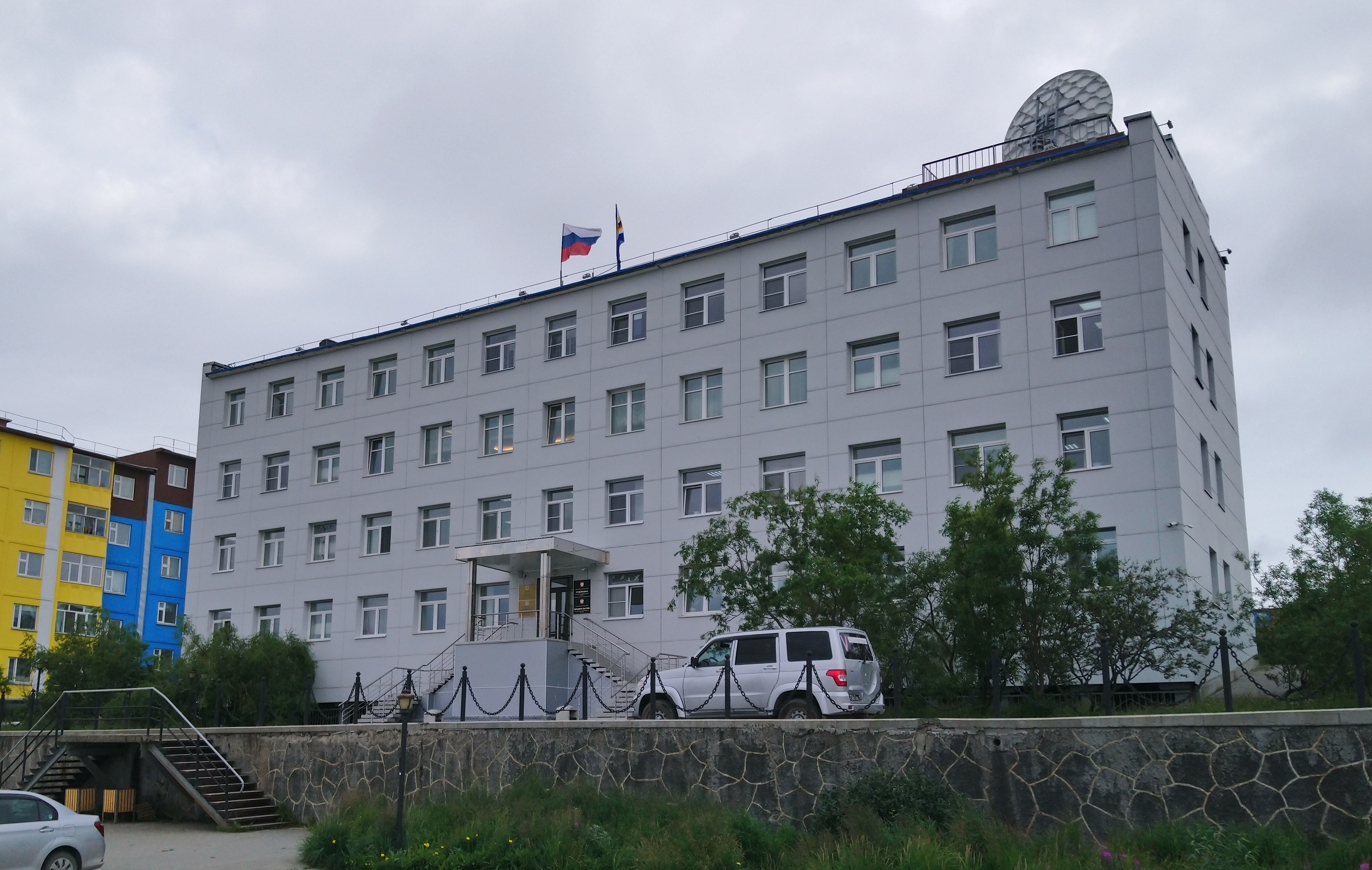
Building of the Government of the Chukotka Autonomous Okrug and governor's office

The governor of Chukotka Autonomous Okrug (Russian: Губернатор Чукотского автономного округа) is the chief executive of Chukotka, an autonomous region in the Russian Far East.

== History of office ==
On 11 November 1991 Chairman of the Executive Committee of the Council of Deputies of Chukotka Aleksandr Nazarov was appointed Head of Administration of the autonomy by Russian president Boris Yeltsin. During Nazarov administration, there was a sharp decline in industrial production, most of the miner settlements were liquidated. The population of Chukotka decreased from nearly 164,000 people in 1989 to 54,000 in 2002. In 2000, during Nazarov's reelection campaign, he was summoned for interrogation by the Federal Tax Police Service. Shortly after he withdrew his candidacy.

Nazarov was succeeded by Roman Abramovich, a Russian oligarch and member of the 3rd State Duma from the Chukotka constituency. According to media reports, he invested a lot of his own funds in the development of the region and improving the living standards of the local population. Abramovich asked president Putin to accept his resignation at least two times: in December 2006, and in the fall of 2007, but these attempts were unsuccessful. He resigned in July 2008 and was succeeded by Roman Kopin, former head of Bilibinsky District. Kopin was succeeded by Vladislav Kuznetsov, after the former resigned in March of 2023.

== List of office-holders ==
No.	Portrait	Name (Birth–Death)	Term	Time in office	Political party	Election
1		Aleksandr Nazarov (born 1951)	11 November 1991 – 17 January 2001 (retired)	9 years, 67 days	Independent	Appointed 1996
2		Roman Abramovich (born 1966)	17 January 2001 – 3 July 2008 (resigned)	7 years, 168 days	Independent	2000; 2005 (Note: Appointed by the president of Russia with the consent of the Duma of Chukotka Autonomous Okrug.)
—		Roman Kopin (born 1974)	3 July 2008 – 24 July 2008	14 years, 255 days	United Russia	Acting
3		Roman Kopin (born 1974)	24 July 2008 – 23 July 2013 (term end)	14 years, 255 days	United Russia	2008
—		Roman Kopin (born 1974)	23 July 2013 – 24 September 2013	14 years, 255 days	United Russia	Acting
(3)		Roman Kopin (born 1974)	24 September 2013 – 15 March 2023 (resigned)	14 years, 255 days	United Russia	2013; 2018
—		Vladislav Kuznetsov (born 1969)	15 March 2023 – 27 September 2023	3 years, 176 days	United Russia	Acting
4		Vladislav Kuznetsov (born 1969)	27 September 2023 – present	3 years, 176 days	United Russia	2023
