= Loren Bridge =

- Coordinates: 65°31′07″N 171°40′45″W
- Carries: Automobile, foot
- Crosses: Loren river
- Locale: Chukotsky District, Chukotka Autonomous Okrug, Russia
- Official name: Russian: Мост через реку Лорэн
- Maintained by: Managements of highways of Chukotka Autonomous Okrug

Characteristics
- Total length: 113 metres (371 ft)
- Width: 6 metres (20 ft)

History
- Designer: Planum Ciprus Limited (2009)
- Constructed by: Planum Ciprus Limited (2009)
- Construction start: 1990s; 2007
- Opened: 1990s; 2 November 2009

Location
- Interactive map of Loren Bridge

The Loren Bridge (Russian: Мост через реку Лорэн) is a unique bridge that crosses the Loren River, and is located in Chukotsky District, Chukotka Autonomous Okrug, Russia.

The two-way bridge is 113 metres (371 ft) long and 6 metres (20 ft) wide and was built to connect the roads between the towns of Lavrentiya and Lorino.

Construction required the structure to span a river delta, a notable engineering feat in Russia's Far East.

The first bridge crossing the Loren was constructed in the 1990s, but the difficult Arctic conditions quickly led to the bridge falling into disrepair. The old bridge was deemed unfit for use and is in the process of dismantlement in favor of the new Loren Bridge.

Building of the new bridge started in 2007 in Vladivostok, where the structure was designed and materials were assembled in order to ship them to the bridge site. In 2008, the FESCO shipping company delivered construction materials and cement for building of the new crossing by boat from the port of Vladivostok to Lorino.

The Steam-ship "Amur" was dispatched for the task on 12 June 2008.

Initial estimates had the bridge being open to the public on 30 October 2009. The bridge opened on 2 November 2009, when the commission led by the Chief of the Department of Building, Reconstruction and Repair of Highways and Management of Highways, Chukotka Autonomous Okrug, Evgeny Bessonov officially approved the structure for use by the public. The Loren Bridge is the first of a series of projects being undertaken under the guidance of Mikhail Zelensky in order to improve Chukotka's infrastructure. Construction of a similar bridge is currently underway over the river Kukun, which was scheduled for completion in 2010. There are also other plans to build similar structures on the rivers of Big and Small Akkani.
