= Avtatkuul =

River in Russia

Location
- Country: Russia

Physical characteristics
- Mouth: Bering Sea
  - location: Gulf of Anadyr
  - coordinates: 64°11′09″N 178°10′01″E
- Length: 197 km (122 mi)
- Basin size: 1,290 km^{2} (500 sq mi)

The Avtatkuul (Russian: Автаткууль) is a stream in Far East Russia. It is 197 kilometres (122 mi) long, and has a drainage basin of 1,290 square kilometres (500 sq mi). It flows through the Nizhneanadyrskaya lowlands, a region of wetlands, small lakes and tundra into the Bering Sea at the Anadyr Bay.

The Avtatkuul and its tributaries belong to the Chukotka Autonomous Okrug administrative region of Russia. The Avtatkuul wetlands surrounding the river are a Wildlife Refuge.
