= Shalaurov Island =

Island in the East Siberian Sea, Russia

Native name: Остров Шалаурова
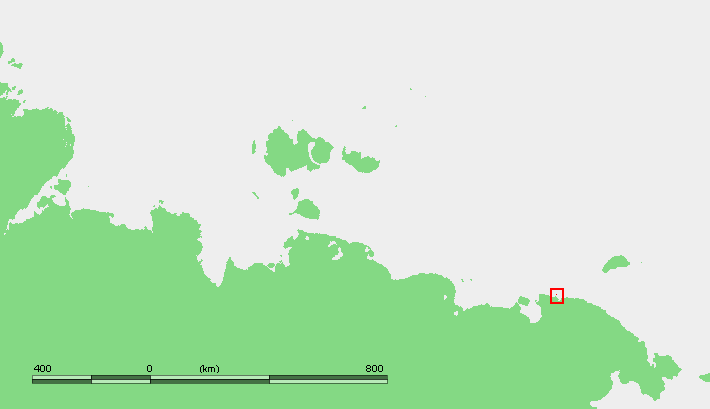

- Location of Shalaurova Island in Russia

Geography
- Location: East Siberian Sea and the Ciukci Sea
- Coordinates: 69.949°N 172.766°E
- Length: 1 km (0.6 mi)
- Width: .8 km (0.5 mi)
- Highest elevation: 90 m (300 ft)

Administration
- Russia

Shalaurov Island or Shalaurova Island (Russian: Остров Шалаурова) is a small island in the eastern end of the East Siberian Sea. It is close to the coast, being only 1.2 km away from a headland located west of the estuary of the Pegtymel River. It lies roughly midway between Cape Shelagskiy and Cape Billings in the Chukotka Autonomous Okrug. The island is named after Russian polar explorer, merchant Nikita Shalaurov.

This island is only 0.8 km across, and is inhabited by kittiwakes.

Shalaurov island should not be confused with Cape Shalaurova (Mys Shalaurova Izba) located further east on the same coastline at 69.850°N 174.555°E.
