= Vladislav Kuznetsov =

Russian politician (born 1969)

- Владислав Кузнецов
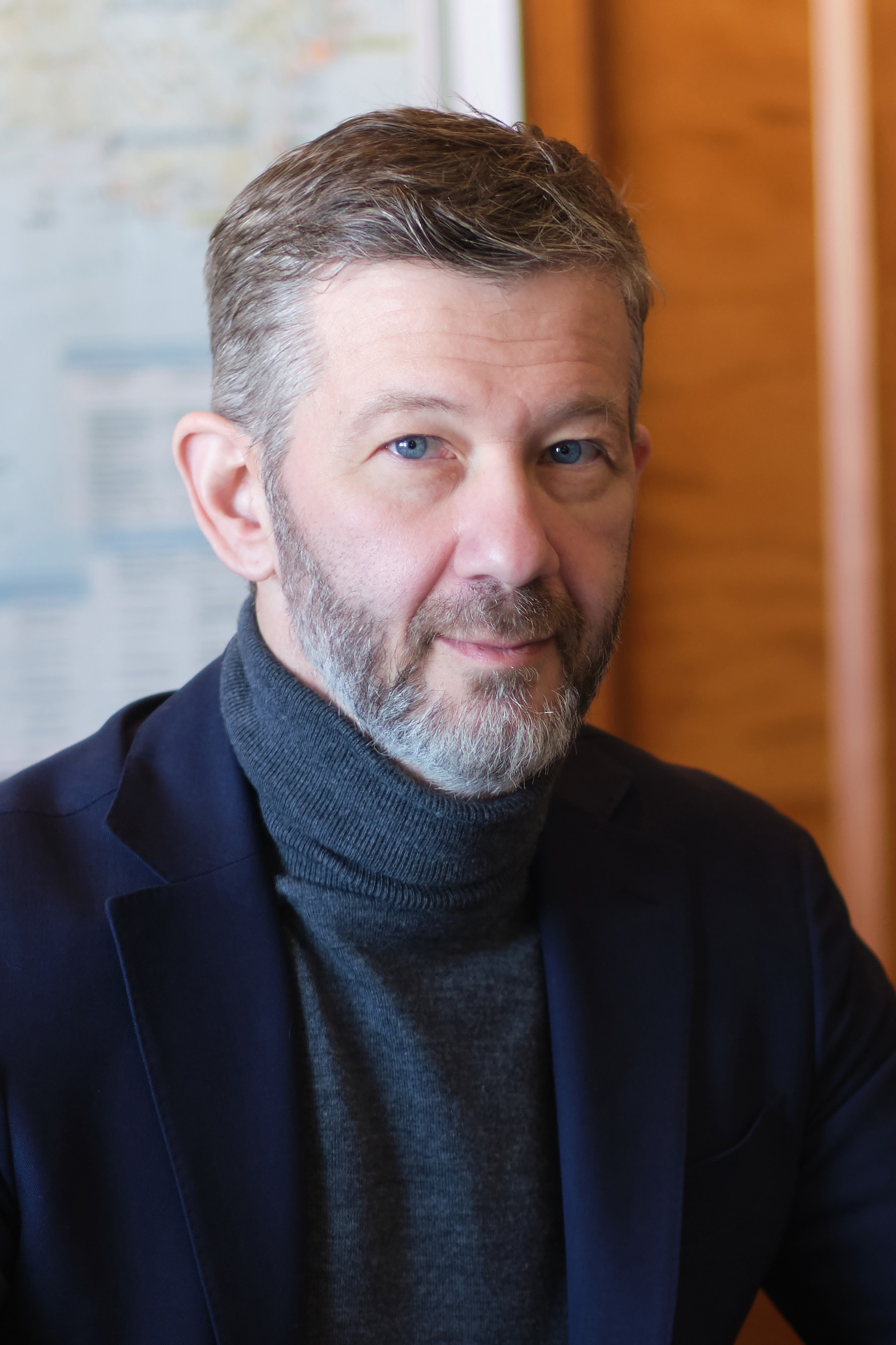
- Kuznetsov in 2023

Governor of Chukotka Autonomous Okrug
- Incumbent
- Assumed office 15 March 2023
- Preceded by: Roman Kopin

First Deputy Prime Minister of Lugansk People's Republic
- In office 9 June 2022 – 15 March 2023
- Head: Leonid Pasechnik
- Prime Minister: Sergey Kozlov

Vice Governor of Kurgan Oblast
- In office 9 January 2019 – 15 December 2021
- Governor: Vadim Shumkov

Member of State Assembly of the Republic of Bashkortostan
- In office 8 September 2013 – 9 September 2018
- Constituency: United Russia party list

Personal details
- Born: 18 March 1969 (age 57) Moscow, Russian SFSR, Soviet Union
- Party: United Russia
- Spouse: Ulyana Ivanova
- Children: 3
- Education: Ordzhonikidze Moscow Institute of Management

Vladislav Gariyevich Kuznetsov (Russian: Владислав Гариевич Кузнецов; born 18 March 1969) is a Russian politician serving as the governor of Chukotka Autonomous Okrug since March 2023.

== Biography ==
Vladislav Kuznetsov was born on 18 March 1969 in Moscow. After graduating high school Kuznetsov enrolled and finished Ordzhonikidze Moscow State Institute of Management.

Kuznetsov started his career in 1992 as a manager in a state-public firm "ISTEK". From 1993 to 1994 he worked as a manager in JSC "Vereshchagin and K". In 1994–1998 Kuznetsov held positions of the economic, senior economist, chief economist, head of the sector, deputy head of the division, deputy director of office – head of division in Moscow Joint-Stock Bank Entrepreneurship Assistance.

He then worked from 1998 to 2002 as deputy head of office of "Russian Capital" bank, and consultant in CJSC "Investment Company Troika Dialog". From 2002 to 2005 Kuznetsov worked as director of the office, and managing director of the "Trust and Investment Bank".

In 2009 Kuznetsov joined Sibur corporation, where until 2009 he worked as deputy head of corporate policy service, and head and deputy head of representative office CJSC "SIBUR-EVROPA LTD" (Switzerland). In 2009–2011 he served as deputy general director of CJSC "SIBUR-MOTORS", and general director of Polief, a Sibur division responsible for terephthalic acid and polyethylene terephthalate production. Kuznetsov moved in November 2011 to SIBUR-PET, where he was general director until February 2014, thus leading Sibur's polyester value chain. From 2014 to 2018 he worked as director for business support in regions at Sibur and advisor to the general director in Moscow. In May – December 2018 Kuznetsov led the Sibur charity foundation – "Formula of Good Deeds".

Vladislav Kuznetsov launched his political career in 2013, when he was elected to the State Assembly of the Republic of Bashkortostan of the 5th convocation on the United Russia party list in Pribelsky regional group No.38. In the State Assembly Kuznetsov was seated in the Committee on Local Self-Government, Civil Society, and Mass Media.

On 9 January 2019 Kuznetsov was appointed Vice Governor of Kurgan Oblast by Governor Vadim Shumkov. The position of Vice Governor was created only in November 2018, when Kurgan Oblast Duma approved the new regional Government structure. Vladislav Kuznetsov worked in Kurgan Oblast for nearly 3 years and left the office of Vice Governor on 15 December 2021, the position itself was abolished the following month. Kuznetsov also left United Russia Kurgan regional political council and its presidium on 29 January 2022.

In June 2022 Vladislav Kuznetsov was appointed First Deputy Prime Minister of the Lugansk People's Republic, at the time recognised by the Russian Federation as an independent state. Until 2022 only a single Deputy Prime Minister position existed in the Government of LNR, which was held by Yury Gotvin. On 4 October 2022 Lugansk People's Republic joined the Russian Federation, however, Kuznetsov retained his position in now–the regional government.

On 15 March 2023 Governor of Chukotka Autonomous Okrug Roman Kopin submitted his resignation after leading the region for 14 years, then second longest-serving current governor, behind Ramzan Kadyrov. Vladislav Kuznetsov was appointed acting Governor of Chukotka by President Vladimir Putin the same day. Kuznetsov previously graduated from the IV class of the cadre reserve training programme at the Higher School of Public Administration at the Russian Presidential Academy of National Economy and Public Administration, the so-called "school of governors", which was nicknamed due to its alumni often being appointed as heads of Russian regions. Kuznetsov was elected Governor for a full term in September 2023 with a landslide 74.32% of the vote.

== Personal life ==
Vladislav Kuznetsov is married to Ulyana Ivanova. She graduated University of Strasbourg (France) in 2012 in "history of international relations and regional integration processes" and then worked at the Infrastructure Development Agency of Tyumen Oblast, as deputy general director of the Investment Agency of Kurgan Oblast (2019–2020), deputy director of the Kurgan Department of Economic Development, Entrepreneurship, and Commerce (2020), and Director of the Department (2020–2021). Kuznetsov and Ivanova have three children: two sons and a daughter.

For his service in Lugansk People's Republic Kuznetsov was placed under sanctions by the United Kingdom in July 2022, Canada in August 2022, and the European Union in October 2022.

== Honours ==
- Letter of Gratitude of the President of Russia (2020) For his contribution to the implementation of the Kurgan Oblast digital broadcasting project

Government offices
Preceded by Roman Kopin	Governor of Chukotka; 15 March 2023 –	Succeeded by Incumbent
