= Aleksandr Nazarov =

Russian politician (born 1951)

- Александр Назаров
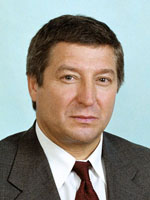

Auditor of the Accounts Chamber of Russia
- In office 23 September 2003 – September 2009
- Preceded by: Ivan Dakhov
- Succeeded by: Alexander Filippenko

Russian Federation Senator from the Chukotka Autonomous Okrug
- In office 18 January 2001 – 15 October 2003
- Succeeded by: Larisa Ponomaryova

1st Governor of Chukotka Autonomous Okrug
- In office 11 November 1991 – 24 December 2000
- Succeeded by: Roman Abramovich

Personal details
- Born: Aleksandr Viktorovich Nazarov; 24 February 1951 (age 75) Yermakovsky District, Pavlodar Oblast, Kazakh SSR, Soviet Union

Aleksandr Viktorovich Nazarov (Russian: Александр Викторович Назаров; born on 24 February 1951) is a Kazakh-born Russian statesman. He served as the first Governor of Chukotka Autonomous Okrug and as the Auditor of the Accounts Chamber of the Russian Federation.

== Biography ==
Aleksandr Nazarov was born on 24 February 1951. He began to work in government posts in 1983. From 1991 to 2000, he served as the first Governor of Chukotka Autonomous Okrug. During his leadership in Chukotka, there was a sharp decline in industrial production, the population decreased several times, and most of the workers' settlements were eliminated. The name of the governor appeared in several cases related to tax and financial offenses - non-return of loans, illegal sale of quotas for the extraction of aquatic biological resources, and misappropriation of budget funds. Immediately before the next gubernatorial elections in 2000, Nazarov was summoned for questioning by the Federal Tax Police Service, shortly after which he withdrew his candidacy.

According to Lyudmila Ainana, the author of the Chukchi language textbook, the famine in Chukotka continued until the end of the 1990s.

Everyone began to eat traditional food, even Russians began to eat what we eat. Then with Zagrebin I wrote a book about Chukotka plants and about the dishes that can be prepared from them. We fed the children feed meal for animals - bread made from them. And at that time, the Americans helped very well - humanitarian aid was sent to us. And Aleksandr Nazarov was a very bad governor. He even wrote a letter to Moscow saying that I and some other indigenous people were enemies of Russia because we contacted America. This is us! I have always been a patriot. And he led Chukotka to the edge of the abyss.

— Lyudmilla Ainana

From 1996 to 2000, Nazarov worked as an official member of the Federation Council. From 2002 to 2003, he was the Representative of the administration of the Chukotka Autonomous Region in the Federation Council. And from 1996 to 2003, he was chairman of the Committee on the Affairs of the North and Indigenous Peoples. Nazarov is also a member of the Parliamentary Assembly of the Council of Europe (PACE).

In 2002, Nazarov submitted a request to the Prosecutor General's Office of the Russian Federation to verify the legitimacy of the Baker-Shevardnadze agreement of 1990 on the division between the Soviet Union and the United States of the Bering Strait, according to which the USSR lost about 200,000 km^{2} of sea territory. According to Nazarov, "Shevardnadze wanted to give the whole Chukotka to the States" and allegedly "managed to prevent <...> a catastrophe: we also wanted to take almost the whole of Chukotka".

Nazarov has been awarded the Order of Honour, the Order "For Merit to the Fatherland" 4th degree, the Order of St. Sergius of Radonezh, 4th degree, the award for Services to Chukotka, the Certificate of Honor of the Federation Council.
