= Karkarpko Island =

Island in Russia

Karkarpko
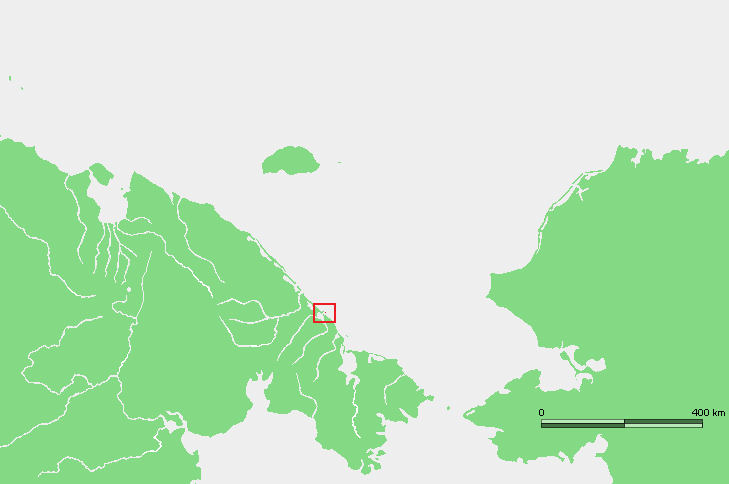
- Location of Karkarpko Island

Geography
- Location: Chukchi Sea
- Coordinates: 67.841°N 175.758°W
- Length: 0.6 km (0.37 mi)

Administration
- Russia

Karkarpko Island (Ostrov Karkarpko) is a small island in the Chukchi Sea. It is close to the coast, being only 3 km (1.9 mi) away to the east from the landtip north of Cape Vankarem in the Chukotka Peninsula.

This island is only 0.6 km (0.37 mi) in length.

Karkarpko Island has a Stationary Observation Site for environmental observations, like the monitoring of species.

== See also ==
- List of islands of Russia
