= Roman Kopin =

Russian politician

- Роман Копин
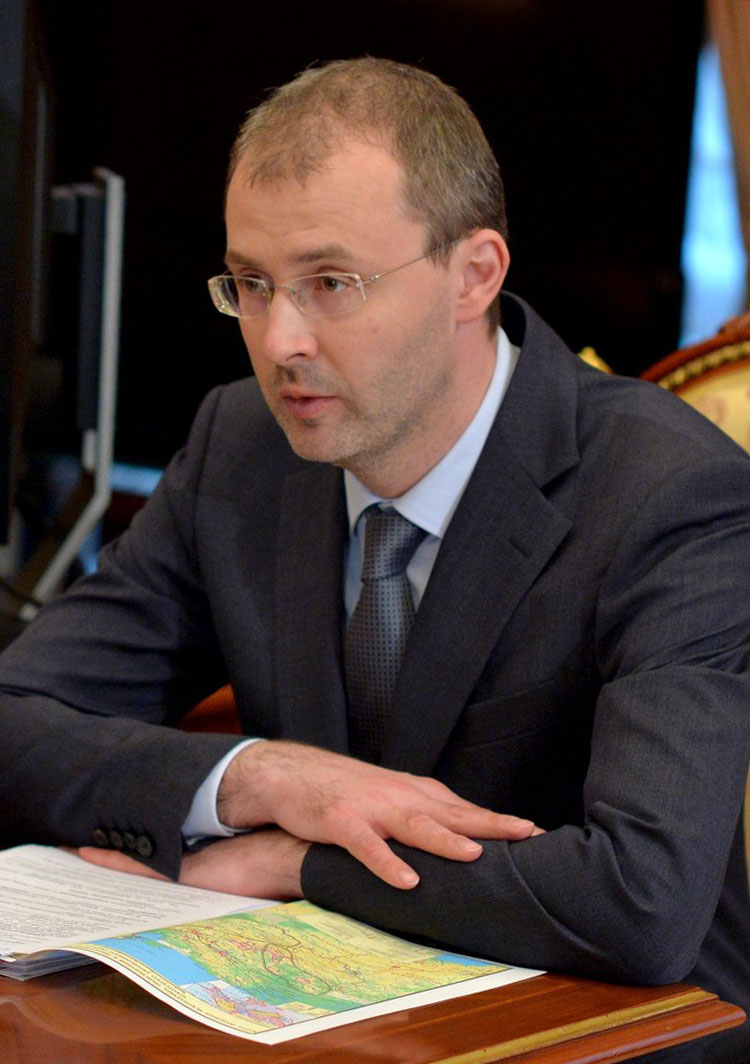
- Kopin in 2015

Governor of Chukotka
- In office 23 July 2008 – 15 March 2023
- President: Dmitry Medvedev; Vladimir Putin
- Preceded by: Roman Abramovich
- Succeeded by: Vladislav Kuznetsov

Personal details
- Born: 5 March 1974 (age 52) Kostroma, Russian SFSR, Soviet Union
- Party: United Russia
- Children: 1
- Education: Volgo-Vyatskaya Academy

Roman Valentinovich Kopin (Russian: Роман Валентинович Копин; born 5 March 1974) is a Russian politician who served as Governor of Chukotka Autonomous Okrug from 2008 to 2023. He succeeded Roman Abramovich in July 2008. On 15 March 2023, Kopin was dismissed and replaced by Vladislav Kuznetsov.

== Early life and education ==
Kopin was born in Kostroma, Kostroma Oblast, on 5 March 1974. In 1996, he graduated from Volgo-Vyatskaya Academy. He majored in state and municipal governing.

== Political career ==
In 1994, Kopin began his political career as the deputy director of the Nizhniy Novgorod Regional Center for Youth Initiatives. In 1995, he was an inspector in the legal department. He later became the leader of the group in the Kostroma custom that dealt with issues involving infringement of custom laws. In 1998, Kopin worked in the branch of the bank SBS-Agro in Kostroma. In 1999, Kopin was appointed as the advisor of Aleksandr Nazarov, who was the governor of Chukotka at the time. Kopin was also the advisor of Nazarov's successor, Roman Arkadyevich Abramovich. In December 2001, Kopin was chosen to be the chief of the municipal union in Chaunsky District. Two years later, in December 2003, he was chosen to be the chief of the municipal district in Bilibinskiy. In these two elections, Kopin received over 70% of the vote.

In April 2008, Kopin was elected to be the deputy governor of Chukotka. He became the supervisor of the department of industrial and agricultural policy.

== Governorship ==
Kopin became the acting governor on 3 July 2008, when Roman Abramovich, the then-governor of Chukotka, resigned. On 11 July Dmitry Medvedev, the president of Russia, nominated Kopin to be the governor. On 13 July the local legislators unanimously confirmed Kopin as the next governor of Chukotka. He was officially inaugurated in Anadyr to be the governor of Chukotka on 24 July 2008.

On 15 March 2023 Governor of Chukotka Autonomous Okrug Roman Kopin submitted his resignation after leading the region for 14 years, then second longest-serving current governor, behind Ramzan Kadyrov. Vladislav Kuznetsov was appointed acting Governor of Chukotka by President Vladimir Putin the same day.

== Personal life ==
Kopin is married and has a son.

On 28 July 2020, he was hospitalized with a suspected COVID-19 infection.

Government offices
Preceded by Roman Abramovich	Governor of Chukotka; 11 July 2008 - 15 March 2023	Succeeded by Vladislav Kuznetsov
