= Flag of Chukotka =

- Proportion: 2:3
- Adopted: 28 February 1994 (original version); 28 October 1997 (current version)
- Design: A blue field charged with a white triangle with the Russian flag rimmed with a yellow border

The flag of Chukotka is a blue field charged with a white triangle at the hoist. At the center of the triangle is a roundel of the flag of Russia rimmed with a thick yellow border.

The blue is the national color of the Chukchi people. It also symbolizes the rivers within the autonomous okrug. The white symbolizes the ice and snow, which covers Chukotka for most of the year. The yellow symbolizes the sun, hope, and friendship.

== Historical flags ==
Flag	Date	Use	Description
	1920–1922	Far Eastern Republic	
	1994–1997	Chukotka Autonomous Okrug	

== Other flags ==
=== Administrative divisions ===
Flag	Date	Use	Description
	2008–present	Flag of Anadyrsky District	
	2012–present	Flag of Chukotsky District	
	2021–present	Flag of Iultinsky District	
	2010–present	Flag of Providensky District	

=== Cities ===
Flag	Date	Use	Description
	2005–present	Flag of Anadyr	
	2010–present	Flag of Lavrentiya	

=== Misattributed flags ===
Flag	Misattributed Usage	Date Created	Description
	Flag of the so-called "Free state of Chukotka"	October 1921	This misattributed flag is a horizontal tricolor, from top to bottom white, pure yellow (#f3e600), and moderate blue (#438dcc). The flag was designed in October 1921. A mobile history game used this flag to represent the native Chukchi people.
	Inaccurate flag report of “Free State of Chukotka”	1990s	This flag was created in the 1990s as a hoax regarding the flag of the Free State of Chukotka. The design originated from a 1970s movie by cinematographers about the Russian Civil War in Siberia. They made a white, red, and blue flag. A vexillologist saw the movie and decided that white, red, and blue should be the flag of Chukotka.
