= Federal Tax Police Service of the Russian Federation =

Federal Tax Police Service

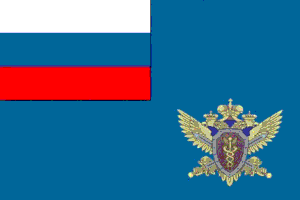
- Abbreviation: FSNP

Agency overview
- Formed: 1992
- Preceding agency: Federal Tax Police Service of Russia
- Dissolved: March 11, 2003
- Employees: 55,000

Jurisdictional structure
- Federal agency: RU
- Operations jurisdiction: RU
- General nature: Federal law enforcement

Operational structure
- Headquarters: Moscow, Russia
- Agency executive: Mikhail Fradkov (Last), Director
- Parent agency: President of Russia

The Federal Tax Police Service of the Russian Federation (In Russian: Федеральная служба налоговой полиции Российской Федерации) was a Russian law enforcement agency started 1992 for investigating and punishing tax evasion in a decentralizing post-Soviet economy. Like many other anti-corruption institutions the Russia Federation created in the early 1990s, this new tax agency was founded on a set of popular, reform-minded beliefs that policing is a service to society.

By the end of decade, however, this 'police as service' ideology was overtaken by more paternalistic views. Following this ideological shift in 1997, non-payment of taxes caused a serious economic crisis in Russia, and the agency was frequently condemned in the West for its violent policing methods.

In 2003, the Tax Police Service was abolished.

== History ==
=== Directorate Z ===
The Federal Tax Police of Russia was established on the basis of the Fifth Chief Directorate of the KGB who was responsible for censorship and internal security against artistic, political, and religious dissension; renamed "Directorate Z" (protecting the Constitutional order) in 1989. In 1991, after the KGB was disestablished, the Directorate was closed.

=== Post-Soviet Tax Enforcement Legislation ===
On March 18, 1992 in accordance with Presidential Decree No. 262, The General Directorate of Tax Investigations was formed as part of the State Tax Service of the Russian Federation (In Russian: Главное управление налоговых расследований при Государственной налоговой службе Российской Федерации) with a nominal strength of 12,000 people. The Office was headed by a Former KGB general, Vladimir B. Yampolsky.

On May 20, 1993 the Law "On Federal Tax Police Bodies" was adopted, whereby as the successor GUNR established by the Department of Tax Police of the Russian Federation (on the Rights of the State Committee of Russia). On the same day the Supreme Council of the Russia (The Low House of the Parliament) approved the Status of the service in the tax police. On 11 October 1993 the Russian Government approved the Regulations on the Tax Police Department of the Russian Federation (Департаменте налоговой полиции Российской Федерации) and the list of positions which are assigned to a special rank tax police. Established staffing level of the federal tax police: on January 1, 1994: 21,500 units; on January 1, 1995: 43,800 units (later the number of staff reaches 53,000 units excluding staff). To Director of the Department was appointed Sergey Nikolaievich Almazov.

The Federal law No. 200-FZ of December 17, 1995 the Law "On Federal Tax Police Bodies" amended. In accordance with the Tax Police Department who was renamed to the Federal Tax Police Service (Федеральную службу налоговой полиции). According to the state director of the Tax Police places a limit on special military rank of Colonel-General of Tax Police, the Deputy Director and heads of key departments (surgical, investigative, tax audits, self-protection, physical security, personnel, organizational-inspection, operational, technical and search) - Lieutenant-General Tax Police.

=== Public Education on Tax Policing ===
The Federal Tax Police Service began publishing The Tax Police newspaper and established several educational institutions, such as the Academy of Tax Police. Published the newspaper "The tax police". On television director Apasyanom was created series about the tax police: "Maroseyka, 12". Publication of the book detective genre of the tax police, among them books department staff writer Nikolai Ivanov ("The Department of Tax Police", and others).

In some other countries of CIS and Lithuania were established similar offices. Subsequently, the Kazakh tax police was transformed into the financial police, in charge of fighting corruption.

The Decree of the Acting Russian President Vladimir Putin on March 16, 2000 in recognition of the importance of the federal tax police in ensuring the economic security has been established professional holiday—Tax Police Day. Russian Tax Police was the law enforcement agency that is fully reimbursed for their content. During 2001 the federal bodies of tax police filed more than 36,000 criminal cases, the amount of damages for consummated criminal cases was about 27 billion rubles, only as a result of operational activity in the Federal Tax Police Service budget is returned more than 100 billion rubles. Revealed more than 150,000 administrative violations, impose administrative fines worth several hundred million rubles.

=== Abolishment ===
On July 1, 2003, by decree No. 306 signed by Russian president Vladimir Putin on March 11, 2003, the Federal Tax Police Service was abolished without any explanation. Most functions of the Tax Police of Russia and the staff at 16,000 units transferred to the Directorate for Taxations Crimes of the Russian Ministry of Internal Affairs. Material base and 40,000 staff units transferred to the newly created State Drug Control Committee.

== Organization ==
The Service was subordinate to the president of Russia.

=== Directors ===
- Vladimir Yampolsky (1991 – 1993)
- Sergey Almazov (1993 – February 18, 1999)
- Vyacheslav Soltaganov (March 22, 1999 – March 28, 2001)
- Mikhail Fradkov (2001 – March 11, 2003)
