= Nikita Shalaurov =

Nikita Shalaurov (Russian: Никита Шалауров) (? - 1764) was a merchant from Veliky Ustyug, Russia and an Arctic explorer.

Nikita Shalurov took part in the Arctic expedition of Afanasy Bakhov (1748-1749) as Bakhov's assistant. Then he took part in another polar expedition of Bakhov (1757-1760) as the leader's chief assistant. Later he organized his own expedition to discover new islands and the full passage to the Pacific Ocean (Northeast Passage). The expedition was the only Russian expedition in the few decades after the Great Northern Expedition by Vitus Bering. It was carried out by Nikita Shalaurov, a trader without government support.

Nikita Shalaurov's ship was named "Vera, Nadezhda i Lubov'" translating into Russian as Faith, Hope and Love. Shalaurov sailed from the Lena River, tried to sail east from the Kolyma River to the Bering Strait in 1762 but was foiled by ice; trying again in 1764, he and his party disappeared. The Chukchi later told of finding the expedition's wintering site littered with skeletons. Apparently Nikita Shalaurov together with his ship and the whole crew died in 1764.

An island in the East Siberian Sea, recently explored in 2005, is named Mys Shalaurova translating as Cliff of Shalaurov after Nikita Sharaulov.
