= Chukotka Autonomous Okrug =

First-level administrative division of Russia

Chukotka Autonomous Okrug Чукотский автономный округ (Russian)
- Autonomous okrug

Other transcription(s)
  - Chukchi: Чукоткакэн автономныкэн округ
- Flag Coat of arms
- Anthem: Anthem of Chukotka Autonomous Okrug
- Coordinates: 66°40′N 171°00′E
- Country: Russia
- Federal district: Far Eastern
- Economic region: Far Eastern
- Established: 10 December 1930
- Administrative center: Anadyr

Government
  - Governor: Vladislav Kuznetsov
  - Legislature: Duma

Area
  - Total: 721,481 km^{2} (278,565 sq mi)
  - Rank: 7th

Population (2021 census)
  - Total: 47,490
  - Estimate (2018): 49,348
  - Rank: 82nd
  - Density: 0.06582/km^{2} (0.1705/sq mi)
  - Urban: 68.2%
  - Rural: 31.8%

GDP (nominal, 2024)
  - Total: ₽187 billion (US$2.19 billion)
  - Per capita: ₽3.9 million (US$45,705.33)
- Time zone: UTC+12 (MSK+9)
- ISO 3166 code: RU-CHU
- License plates: 87
- OKTMO ID: 77000000
- Official languages: Russian
- Recognised languages: Chukchi
- Website: чукотка.рф

Chukotka, (Note: /tʃʊˈkɒtkə/ chuu-KOT-kə; Russian: Чукотка [tɕʊˈkotkə]) officially the Chukotka Autonomous Okrug, (Note: Russian: Чукотский автономный округ, romanized: Čukotskij avtonomnyj okrug, IPA: [tɕʊˈkotskʲɪj ɐftɐˈnomnɨj ˈokrʊk]; Chukot: Чукоткакэн автономныкэн округ, romanized: Cukotkaken awtonomnyken okrug, IPA: [tɕukotˈkaken awtoˈnomnəken ˈokɻ̊ux]) is the easternmost federal subject of Russia. It is an autonomous okrug situated in the Russian Far East. It shares a border with the Sakha Republic to the west, Magadan Oblast to the south-west, and Kamchatka Krai to the south, as well as a maritime border on the Bering Strait with the U.S. state of Alaska to the east. Anadyr is the largest town and the capital, and the easternmost settlement to have town status in Russia. It is the closest point from Russia to the United States, measuring at 88.51 kilometres or 55 miles.

Chukotka is primarily populated by ethnic Russians, Chukchi, and other indigenous peoples. It is the only autonomous okrug in Russia that is not included in, or subordinate to, another federal subject, having separated from Magadan Oblast in 1992. It is home to Lake Elgygytgyn, an impact crater lake, and Anyuyskiy, an extinct volcano. The village of Uelen is the easternmost settlement in Asia and the closest substantial settlement in Russia to the United States (Alaska).

The autonomous okrug covers an area of over 737,700 square kilometers (284,800 sq mi), and is the seventh-largest federal subject in Russia. However, it has a population of only 50,526. Chukotka is the second-least-populated federal subject, and the least densely populated federal subject in Russia. The region is the northeasternmost region of Russia, and since the sale of Alaska in 1867, it has been the only part of Russia lying partially in the Western Hemisphere.

== Geography ==
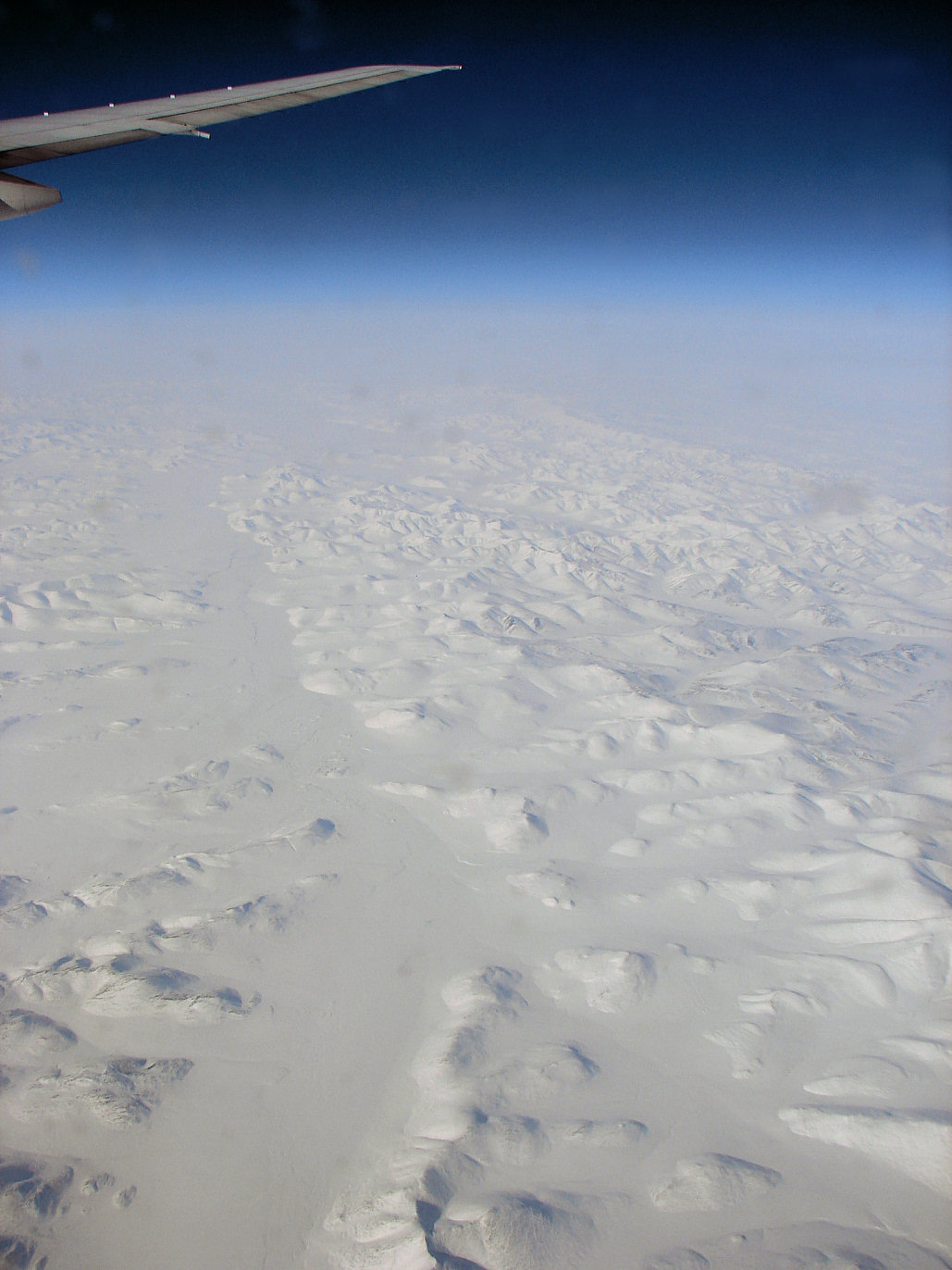
Frozen wilderness of far northern Chukotka

Chukotka is bordered in the north by the Chukchi Sea and the East Siberian Sea, which are part of the Arctic Ocean; in the east by the Bering Strait and the Bering Sea, part of the Pacific Ocean; in the south by Kamchatka Krai and Magadan Oblast; and in the west by the Sakha Republic. The Chukchi Peninsula projects eastward forming the Bering Strait between Siberia and the Alaska Peninsula, and encloses the north side of the Gulf of Anadyr. The peninsula's easternmost point, Cape Dezhnev, is also the easternmost point of mainland Russia. While most of Russia is on the Eurasian plate, Chukotka sits on the North American plate.

Ecologically, Chukotka can be divided into three distinct areas: the northern Arctic desert, the central tundra, and the taiga in the south. About half of its area is above the Arctic Circle. This area is very mountainous, containing the Chukotsky Mountains (highest point Iskhodnaya) and the Anadyr Highlands.

Chukotka's rivers spring from its northern and central mountains. The major rivers are:

- Anadyr River, with tributaries Belaya, Tanyurer, Yablon, Yeropol, Mayn and Velikaya rivers, as well as the Avtatkuul River, which flows across the Anadyr Lowlands into the Gulf of Anadyr.
- Omolon and the Great and Little Anyuy Rivers flow west into the Kolyma River in Yakutia (Sakha).
- Rauchua, Chaun, Palyavaam, Pegtymel, Chegitun and Amguyema Rivers that flow north into the arctic seas.

The largest lakes are Lake Krasnoye, west of Anadyr, Lake Pekulney and Lake Elgygytgyn in central Chukotka. Other important lakes are Koolen, Lake Ioni, Pychgynmygytgyn, Medvezhye, Achchyon and Maynits.

The okrug's extensive coastline has several peninsulas, the main ones being the Kyttyk Peninsula, Cape Shelagsky, the Aachim Peninsula, the Chukchi Peninsula and Russkaya Koshka.

There are also several islands belonging to Chukotka, from west to east the main ones being Ayon Island, Ryyanranot Island, Chengkuul Island, Mosey Island, the Routan Islands, Shalaurov Island, Wrangel Island, Herald Island, Kosa Dvukh Pilotov Island, Karkarpko Island, Kolyuchin Island, Serykh Gusey Islands, Idlidlya Island, Big Diomede Island, Ilir Island, Arakamchechen Island, Yttygran Island, Merokinkan Island, Achinkinkan Island and Kosa Meechkyn Island.

Large parts of Chukotka are covered with moss, lichen, and arctic plants, similar to western Alaska. Surrounding the Gulf of Anadyr and in the river valleys grow small larch, pine, birch, poplar, and willow trees. More than 900 species of plants grow in Chukotka, including 400 species of moss and lichen. It is home to 220 bird species and 30 fresh water fish species.

=== Climate ===
Chukotka's climate is influenced by its location on the three neighboring seas: the Bering Sea, the East Siberian Sea, and the Chukchi Sea with its weather characterized by cold northerly winds that can quickly change to wet southern winds. Cape Navarin has the highest number of hurricanes and storms in Russia. The coastal areas are windy with little precipitation, between 200 and 400 mm (7.9 and 15.7 in) per year. Temperature varies between −45 and −15 °C (−49 and 5 °F) in January, and between +5 and +14 °C (41 and 57 °F) in July. Growing season is short, lasting only 80 to 100 days per year.

== History ==
=== Pre-history ===
The first inhabitants were Paleo-Siberian hunters who came to Chukotka from Central and East Asia. The area was then part of the Beringia land bridge that is thought to have enabled human migration to the Americas.

=== Pre-Russian ===
Traditionally, Chukotka was the home of the native Chukchi people, Siberian Yupiks, Koryaks, Chuvans, Evens/Lamuts, Yukaghirs, and Inuit. As of 1930, the population was primarily Chukchi.

=== Russian exploration and conquest ===
After the Russians conquered the Kazan and Astrakhan Khanates in the 16th century, the trade routes to the Urals, Siberia, and Central Asia opened for travel and traders and Cossacks moved eastwards. The Cossacks built forts in strategic locations and subjected the indigenous people to the Tsar.

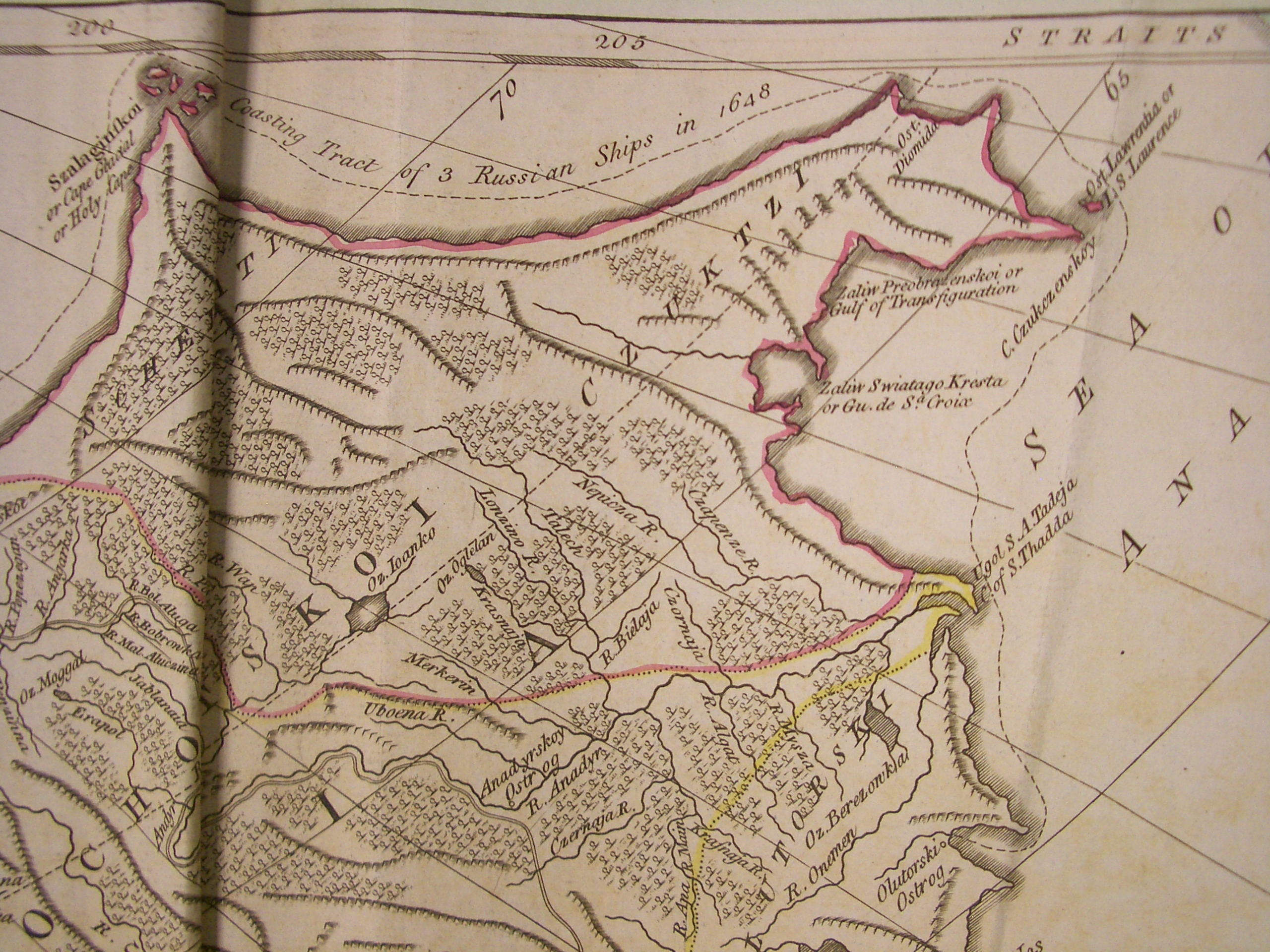
An early (1773) map of Chukotka, showing the route of Dezhnyov expedition of 1648

During the first half of the 17th century, Russians reached the far north-east. In 1641, the first reference to Chukchi people was made by the Cossacks. In 1649, Russian explorer Semyon Dezhnyov explored the far north-eastern coast and established winter quarters on the upstream portion of the Anadyr River that became the fortified settlement of Anadyrsk. Dezhnyov tried to subjugate the Chukchi and exact tribute during the next ten years, but was mostly unsuccessful. Eventually, the fort was abandoned, because of the harsh northern conditions and lack of game animals for food.

At the end of the 17th century, the fort regained some importance when the sea route from Anadyrsk to Kamchatka was discovered. It was used as the staging base for expeditions to Kamchatka and all other forts and settlements were made subject to Anadyrsk. When the wealth of Kamchatka's natural resources was discovered, the Russian government started to give the far north-eastern region more serious attention. In 1725, Tsar Peter the Great ordered Vitus Bering to explore Kamchatka and Afanasy Shestakov to lead a military expedition to subjugate the Chukchi. This expedition failed when the fleet suffered shipwreck and the survivors, including Shestakov, were killed by the Chukchi.

In 1731, Dmitry Pavlutsky tried again, aided by Cossacks, Yukaghirs, and Koryaks (indigenous Siberian tribes that were subjugated earlier). Pavlutsky sailed up the Anadyr River and destroyed the Chukchi garrison on the Arctic Ocean. His ruthless methods had some limited success in forcing tribute from some Chukchi. But in 1747, the Chukchi defeated the Russian regiment and killed Pavlutsky.

Realizing that the Chukchi could not easily be subjugated by military means, the Russians changed tactics and offered the Chukchi citizenship in the Russian Empire. A peace treaty was concluded in 1778 in which the Chukchi were exempted from paying yasak.

That same year, British Captain James Cook made an exploration of Cape North (now Cape Schmidt) and Providence Bay. Anxious that other European powers would occupy the area, Tsaritsa Catherine II ordered the exploration and mapping of the area. Starting in 1785, an expedition led by Joseph Billings and Gavril Sarychev mapped the Chukchi Peninsula, the west coast of Alaska, and the Aleutian Islands. Then from 1821 to 1825, Ferdinand von Wrangel and Fyodor Matyushkin led expeditions along the coast of the East Siberian Sea and explored the Kolyma, Great Anyuy, and Little Anyuy Rivers.

=== Western influence ===
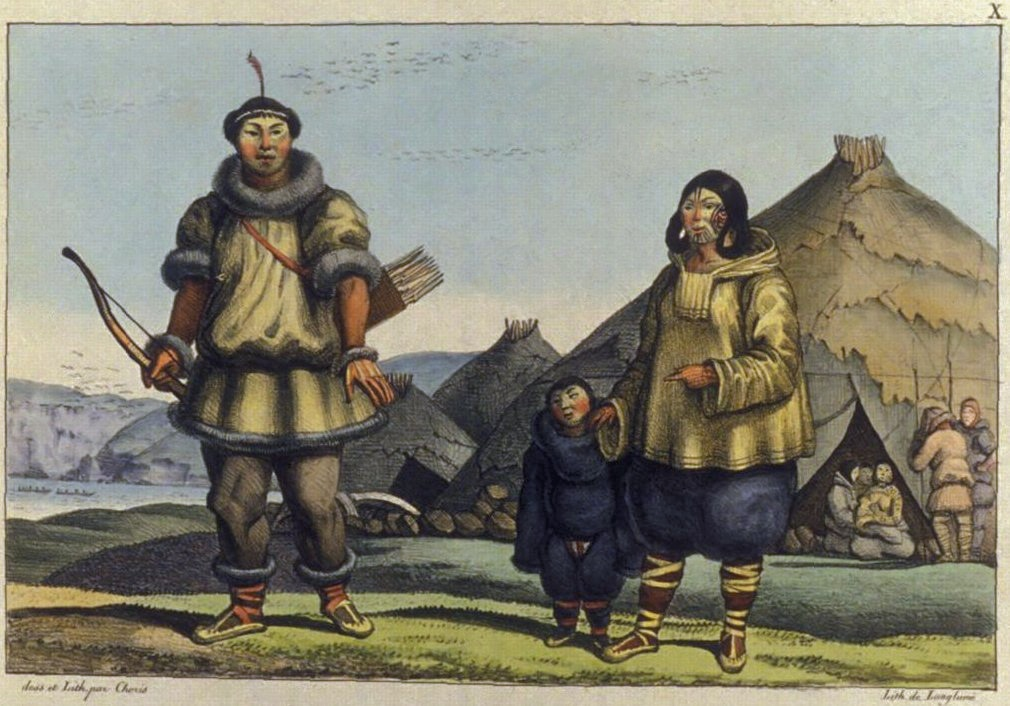
Painting of Chukchi by Louis Choris, 1816

Chukotka remained mostly outside the control of the Russian Empire and consequently other foreign powers (American, British, Norwegian) began to hunt and trade in the area from about 1820 onwards. After the sale of Alaska to the United States, American whalers and traders especially extended their activities into Chukotka and foreign influence reached its peak. By 1880, the Russians reacted by setting up coastal patrols to stop American ships and confiscate their property. And in 1888, the administrative region of Anadyr was created. Yet Russian control diminished again and around 1900, a large stream of foreigners entered Chukotka, lured to the region by the Yukon gold rush in 1898.

In 1909, in order to keep the region within Russian control, two districts were created within the Anadyr Region: the districts of Anadyr and Chukotka. The Russian government granted concessions to foreign companies such as the Hudson's Bay Company and the US Northeast Siberia Company, which was granted gold, iron, and graphite mining rights in the entire Chukotka between 1902 and 1912.

Wrangel Island in particular was subject to claims by the United States and Canada. In 1916, the Russians officially claimed the uninhabited island. But in 1921, Canadian Vilhjalmur Stefansson made a serious attempt to claim it for Canada by populating it and building a small settlement. Another contingent arrived in 1923 but a year later, the Soviets permanently conquered the island, removing the remaining inhabitants, and thereby ending all foreign influence.

=== Soviet period ===
Chukotka was subject to collectivization and resettlement of the indigenous people, but this process started later and was less extreme than in other parts of the Soviet Union.

When Nazi Germany attacked the Soviet Union in 1941, everything was done to start tin production as quickly as possible in Chukotka. Mining rapidly developed, and this industry would become its economic base. Also during the war, geologists discovered large reserves of gold that would be mined in the 1950s.

The Chukotka National Okrug (later Autonomous Okrug) was created in 1930 and was originally subordinated to Far Eastern Krai. In 1932, Kamchatka Oblast was created within the Far Eastern Krai (later Khabarovsk Krai) and was given jurisdiction over Chukotka from 1932 to 1953. Since the formation of Magadan Oblast from the northern parts of Khabarovsk Krai in 1953, Chukotka was administratively subordinated to the region.

=== Modern period ===
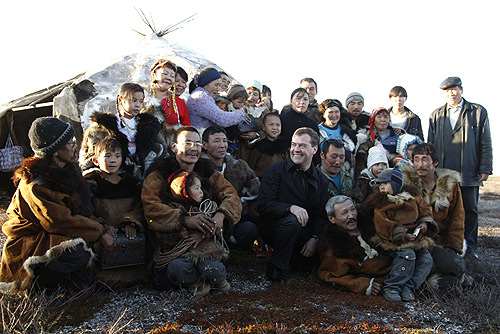
Russian president Dmitry Medvedev in Chukotka, 2008

In 1991, Chukotka declared its separation to become a subject of the Russian Federation in its own right, a move that was confirmed by the Constitutional Court of the Russian Federation in 1993.

From 2001 to 2008, Roman Abramovich was the governor of Chukotka. He invested billions of rubles, including his own money, into the Chukotka economy by developing its infrastructure, schools, and housing. This has helped to double the GDP of the region and to more than triple the income of its residents. In 2004, Abramovich tried to resign from this position but was reappointed governor for another term by Vladimir Putin. In early July 2008, it was announced that President Dmitry Medvedev had accepted Abramovich's latest request to resign as governor of Chukotka. He had visited the region only once in 2008. In the period 2000–2006 the average salaries in Chukotka increased from about US$165 (€117/£100) per month in 2000 to US$826 (€588/£500) per month in 2006.

On 11 July 2008, Dmitry Medvedev nominated Roman Kopin to be the governor. On 13 July, the local legislators unanimously confirmed Kopin as the next governor of Chukotka. As of 2023, Vladislav Kuznetsov is the current governor of the Chukotka Autonomous Okrug.

== Economy ==
Chukotka has large reserves of oil, natural gas, coal, gold, and tungsten, which are slowly being mined, but much of the rural population survives on subsistence reindeer herding, whale hunting, and fishing. The urban population is employed in mining, administration, construction, cultural work, education, medicine, and other occupations.

The largest companies in the region include Chukotka Mining and Geological Company (Highland Gold), Severnoye zoloto, Mayskoye Gold Mining Company (Polymetal), FSUE Chukotsnab. In April 2022, Kinross announced that it was selling 100% of its Russian assets following other international companies obliged to exit the Russian economy.

== Transportation ==
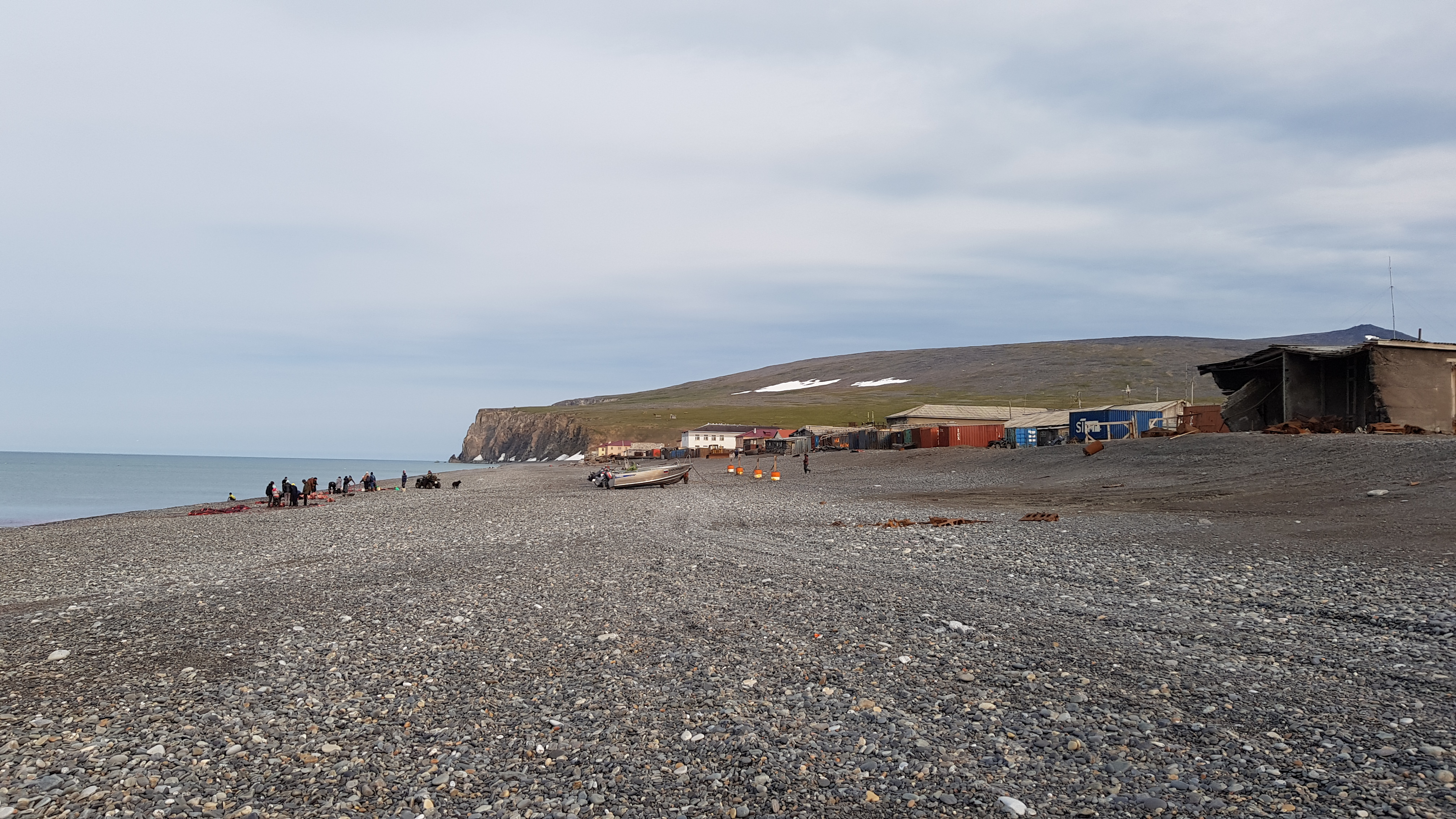
Uelen on the Arctic Ocean is the easternmost settlement in Russia and the whole of Eurasia.

Chukotka is mostly roadless and air travel is the main mode of passenger transport. There are local permanent roads between some settlements (e.g. Egvekinot-Iultin (200 km (124 mi))). When cold enough, winter roads are constructed on the frozen rivers to connect regional settlements in a uniform network. The Anadyr Highway is under construction to link Chukotka to Magadan, and to connect the settlements of Anadyr, Bilibino, Komsomolsky and Egvekinot within Chukotka.

In 2009, replacement of the emergency bridge through Loren River on the busy local road from Lavrentiya to Lorino (40 km (25 mi)) became the main event in transport in Chukotka.

The main airport is Ugolny Airport near Anadyr. Coastal shipping also takes place, but ice prevents this for at least half the year.

== Local government ==
The legislative (representative) body of state power is the Duma of the Chukotka Autonomous Okrug. It consists of 15 deputies elected for a term of 5 years. As of 2016, it is represented by three factions: United Russia, LDPR, and CPRF.

=== Governor ===
The current governor of Chukotka is Vladislav Kuznetsov, who replaced Roman Kopin on 15 March 2023. Kuznetsov previously served as deputy prime minister of the unrecognized Luhansk People's Republic.

The governor is elected by universal suffrage for a term of 5 years.

Governors of the Chukotka Autonomous Okrug
1991–2000	Aleksandr Nazarov
2000–2008	Roman Abramovich
2008–2023	Roman Kopin
2023 – present	Vladislav Kuznetsov

Roman Abramovich was governor of Chukotka from 2000 to 2008. Abramovich had spent over US$1 billion in the region (partly as normal tax payments) on developing infrastructure and providing direct aid to the inhabitants during his time as governor from 2000 until 2008. In 2004, there were also reports, however, that Chukotka gave Abramovich's company Sibneft tax breaks in excess of US$450 million.

On 13 July 2008, the deputies of the Duma of the Chukotka Autonomous Okrug, during a secret ballot, unanimously approved Roman Kopin as governor, whose candidacy was submitted for consideration to the Duma of the Chukotka Autonomous Okrug on 11 July 2008 by Russian president Dmitry Medvedev in connection with the early resignation of Abramovich. On 8 September 2013, Kopin was elected governor.

On 15 March 2023, Vladislav Kuznetsov replaced Kopin as the governor of Chukotka.

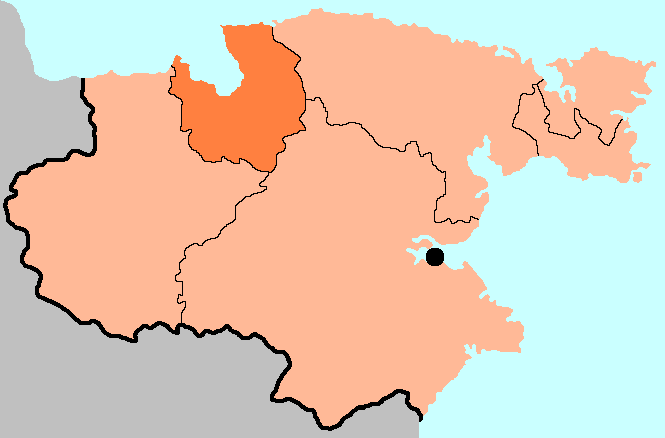
Districts of Chukotka. Chaunsky District and Anadyr town highlighted.

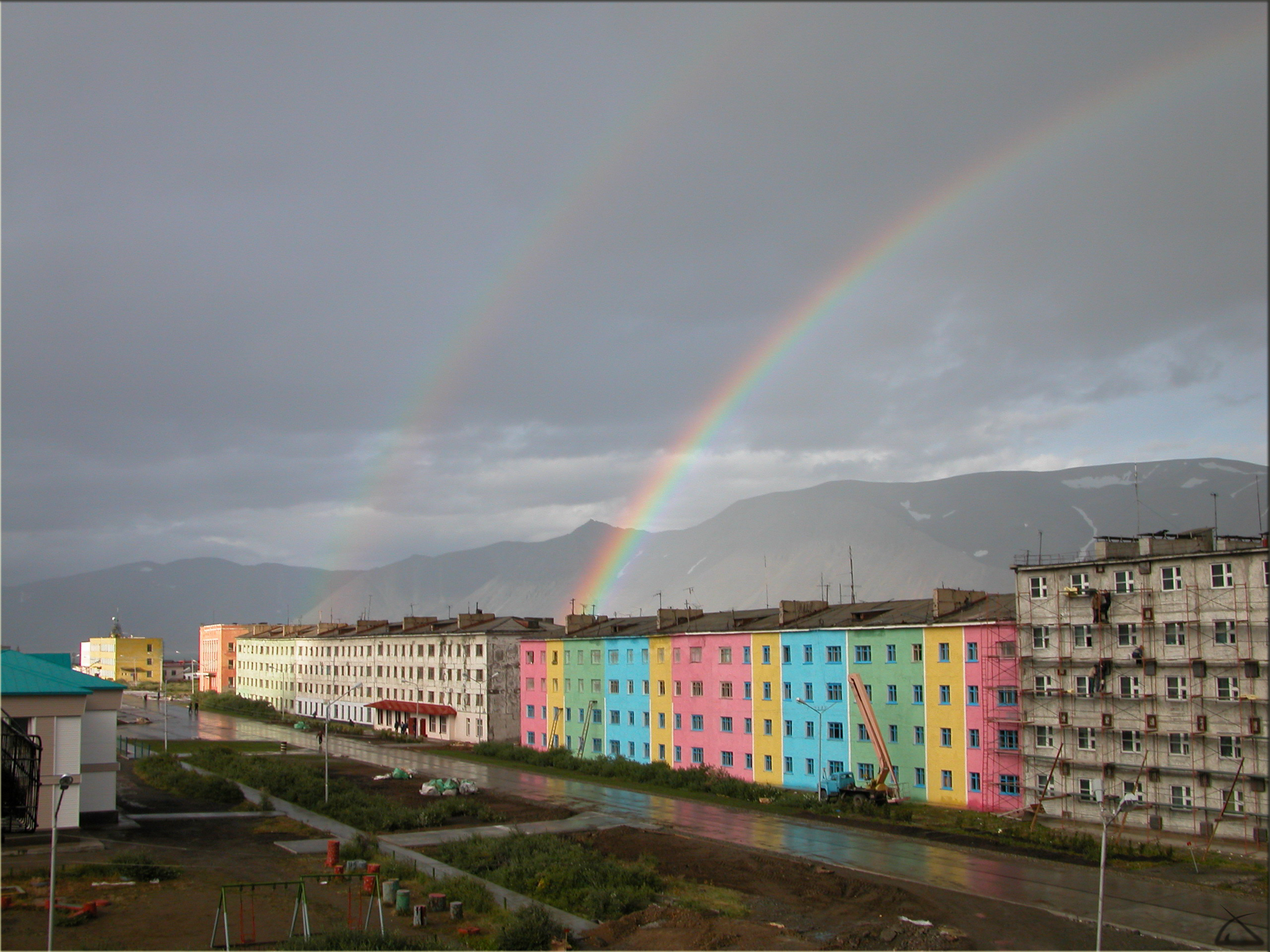
View of Egvekinot

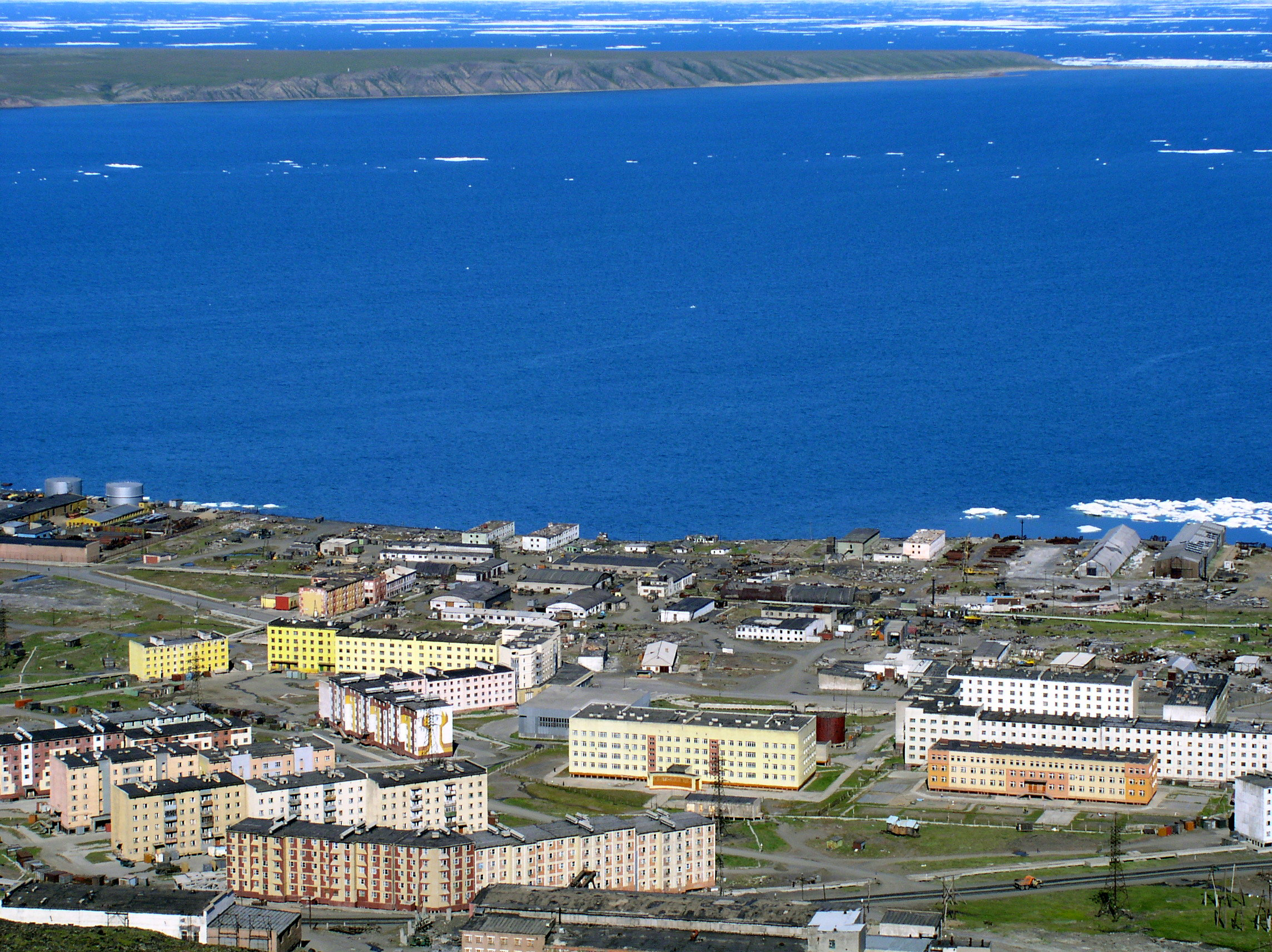
Pevek

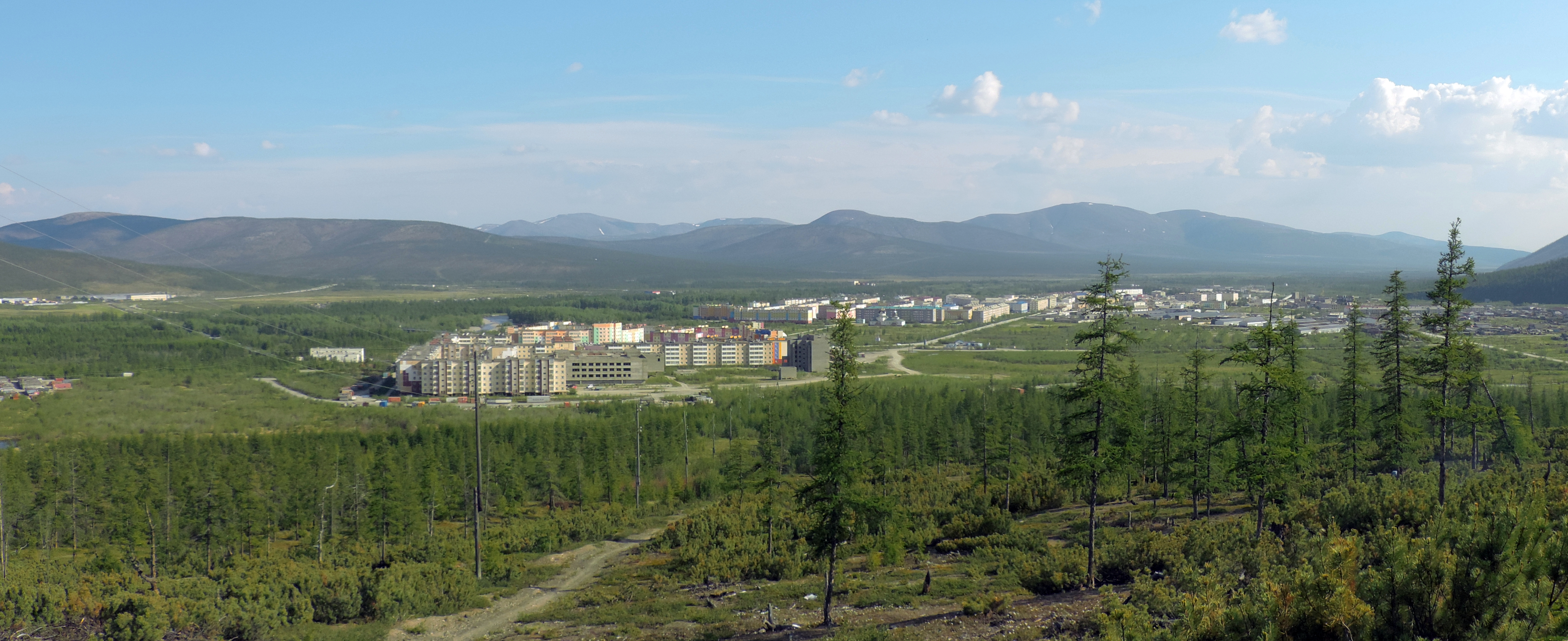
Bilibinsky District in Chukotka

== Administrative divisions ==
Chukotka Autonomous Okrug is administratively divided into the following districts:

Along the Arctic coast (from west to east): Bilibinsky District (northwest), Chaunsky District around Chaunskaya Bay, then Iultinsky District, and finally Chukotsky District at the eastern cape.

Along the Pacific coast (from north to south): Providensky District south of Chukotsky, southern Iultinsky District around Kresta Bay, and finally eastern Anadyrsky District at the Anadyr Estuary.

Interior: The western quarter of the Okrug is Bilibinsky District, and the rest of the interior is Anadyrsky District.

== Demographics ==
Population: 47,490 (2021 census); 50,526 (2010 census); 53,824 (2002 census); 157,528 (1989 Soviet census). The Chukotka Autonomous Okrug is one of the very few places in Russia where there are more men than women.

=== Vital statistics ===
	Average population	Live births	Deaths	Natural change	Crude birth rate (per 1000)	Crude death rate (per 1000)	Natural change (per 1000)	Fertility rates
1970	103,000	1,751	599	1,152	17.0	5.8	11.2	
1975	124,000	2,113	627	1,486	17.0	5.1	12.0	
1980	143,000	2,208	653	1,555	15.4	4.6	10.9	
1985	154,000	2,659	627	2,032	17.3	4.1	13.2	
1990	160,000	2,208	598	1,610	13.8	3.7	10.1	
1991	153,000	1,912	631	1,281	12.5	4.1	8.4	
1992	136,000	1,565	763	802	11.5	5.6	5.9	
1993	118,000	1,191	907	284	10.1	7.7	2.4	
1994	104,000	1,153	884	269	11.1	8.5	2.6	
1995	90,000	935	816	119	10.4	9.1	1.3	
1996	81,000	935	816	119	11.5	10.1	1.5	
1997	75,000	818	598	220	10.9	8.0	2.9	
1998	70,000	855	612	243	12.3	8.8	3.5	
1999	64,000	672	530	142	10.4	8.2	2.2	
2000	60,000	686	570	116	11.5	9.6	1.9	
2001	56,000	719	701	18	12.7	12.4	0.3	
2002	54,000	653	611	42	12.1	11.3	0.8	
2003	53,000	679	562	117	12.8	10.6	2.2	
2004	53,000	787	623	164	15.0	11.9	3.1	
2005	52,000	795	597	198	15.2	11.4	3.8	
2006	52,000	771	585	186	14.8	11.3	3.6	
2007	52,000	801	595	206	15.5	11.5	4.0	
2008	51,000	751	620	131	14.6	12.1	2.5	
2009	51,000	695	640	55	13.6	12.5	1.1	1.67
2010	51,000	746	698	48	14.7	13.8	0.9	1.89
2011	51,000	688	560	128	13.6	11.1	2.5	1.81
2012	51,000	711	580	131	14.0	11.4	2.6	1.97
2013	51,000	662	533	129	13.1	10.5	2.6	1.91
2014	51,000	690	551	139	13.7	10.9	2.8	2.04
2015	50,000	683	485	198	13.5	9.6	3.9	2.10
2016	50,000	671	501	170	13.4	10.0	3.4	2.10(e)

Historical population
Year	Pop.	±%
1897	12,900	—
1926	13,500	+4.7%
1939	21,524	+59.4%
1959	46,689	+116.9%
1970	101,184	+116.7%
1979	132,859	+31.3%
1989	157,528	+18.6%
2002	53,824	−65.8%
2010	50,526	−6.1%
2021	47,490	−6.0%
Source: Census data

=== Life expectancy ===
As of June 2022, Chukotka had the lowest life expectancy in Russia. This statistic varies greatly from year to year due to the region's relatively small population.

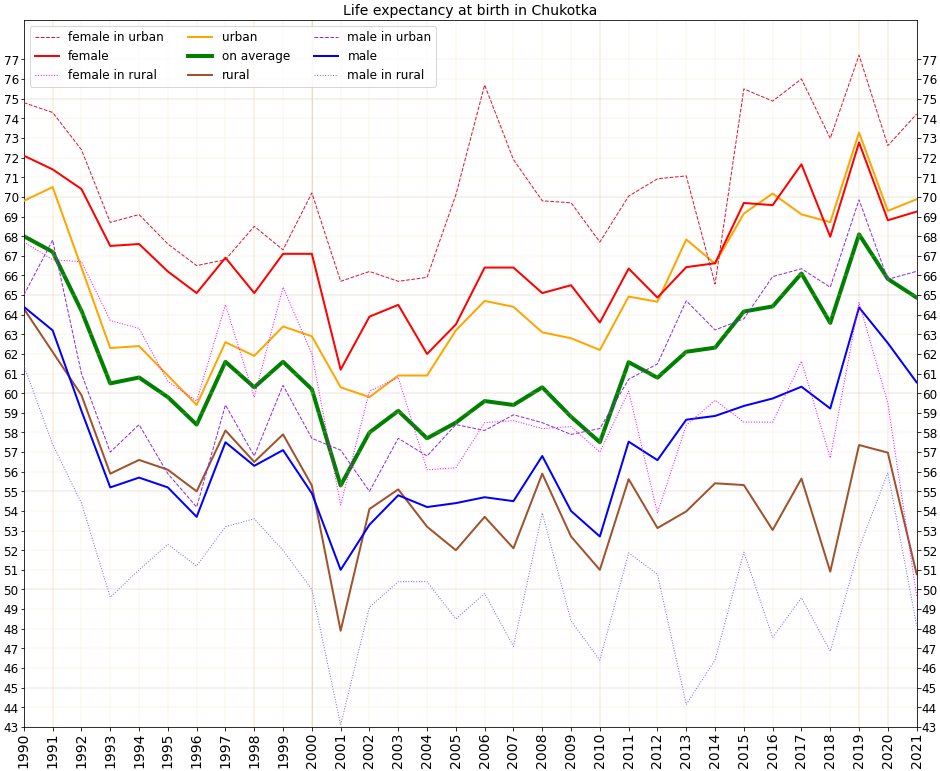
Life expectancy at birth in Chukotka

=== Ethnic groups ===
According to the 2021 Census, the ethnic composition was:

- Russian 54.2%
- Chukchi 28.3%
- Ukrainian 3.2%
- Yupik 3.1%
- Even 2.7%
- Chuvan 1.6%
- Kalmyk 0.8%
- Tatar 0.7%
- Buryat 0.5%
- other groups of less than two hundred persons each

Historical figures are given below:

Ethnic group	1939 Census		1959 Census		1970 Census		1979 Census		1989 Census		2002 Census		2010 Census		2021 Census^{1}	
Ethnic group	Number	%	Number	%	Number	%	Number	%	Number	%	Number	%	Number	%	Number	%
Chukchis	12,111	56.2%	9,975	21.4%	11,001	10.9%	11,292	8.1%	11,914	7.3%	12,622	24.0%	12,772	26.7%	13,292	28.3%
Chuvans	12,111	56.2%	9,975	21.4%	11,001	10.9%	11,292	8.1%	944	0.6%	951	1.8%	897	1.9%	742	1.6%
Yupik	800	3.7%	1,064	2.3%	1,149	1.1%	1,278	0.9%	1,452	0.9%	1,534	2.9%	1,529	3.2%	1,460	3.1%
Evens	817	3.8%	820	1.8%	1,061	1.0%	969	0.7%	1,336	0.8%	1,407	2.7%	1,392	2.9%	1,285	2.7%
Russians	5,183	24.1%	28,318	60.7%	70,531	69.7%	96,424	68.9%	108,297	66.1%	27,918	53.1%	25,068	52.5%	25,503	54.2%
Ukrainians	571	2.7%	3,543	7.6%	10,393	10.3%	20,122	14.4%	27,600	16.8%	4,960	9.4%	2,869	6.0%	1,526	3.2%
Others	2,055	9.5%	2,969	6.4%	7,049	7.0%	9,859	7.0%	12,391	7.6%	3,233	6.1%	2,961	6.2%	3,236	6.9%
All	21,537		46,689		101,194		139,944		163,934		53,824		50,526		47,490	
^{1} 446 people were registered from administrative databases, and could not declare an ethnicity. It is estimated that the proportion of ethnicities in this group is the same as that of the declared group.

There are 86 recognized ethnic groups in the okrug as of 2021. Indigenous peoples make up 37% of the total population.

Ethnographic maps shows the Yupik peoples as the indigenous population of some villages near Provideniya, Chuvans in the Chuvanskoye village some 100 km (62 mi) west of Markovo, the Evens in some inland areas, and the Chukchi throughout the rest of the region.

=== Religion ===
The Russian Orthodox Church in Chukotka is represented by the Eparchy (Diocese) of Anadyr and Chukotka (Russian: Анадырская и Чукотская епархия). The controversial conservative Bishop of Anadyr and Chukotka, Diomid, who had occupied the Anadyr see since 2000 and had been instrumental in the development of the church in the peninsula, was removed by the Holy Synod in the summer of 2008. Diomid would later go on to establish a True Orthodox denomination in Chukotka, which has become largely inactive. Diomid was succeeded by Mark (Tuzhikov) as he was the acting Archbishop of Khabarovsk at the time.

The current Russian Orthodox bishop of Chukotka is Ipaty (Golubev) who was installed on 21 August 2018.

There is also a small evangelical presence in the city of Provideniya, founded by the Moldovan community there.

== See also ==
- Bering Strait
- Chukchi Peninsula
- Wrangel Island
