= Avis-Amur Flight 9209 =

2011 cargo aircraft crash in Russia

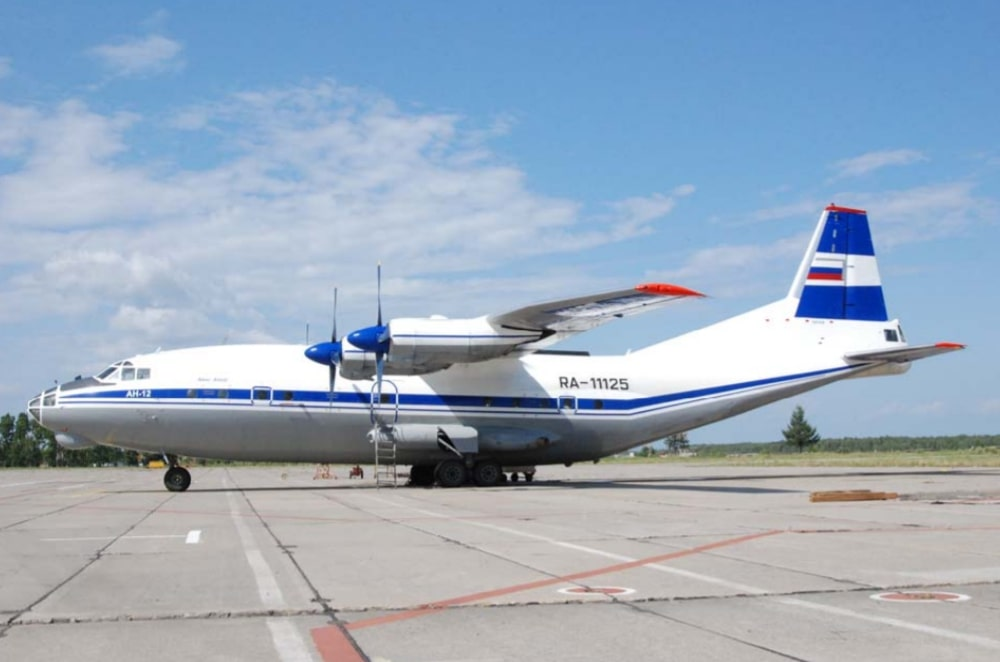
- RA-11125, the An-12 involved

Accident
- Date: 9 August 2011
- Summary: Loss of control after engine fire
- Site: Near Omsukchan, Russia; 61°59′35″N 154°32′13″E

Aircraft
- Aircraft type: Antonov An-12AP
- Operator: Avis Amur
- ICAO flight No.: JIH9209
- Registration: RA-11125
- Flight origin: Sokol Airport, Magadan, Russia
- Destination: Keperveyem Airport, Keperveyem, Russia
- Occupants: 11
- Passengers: 2
- Crew: 9
- Fatalities: 11
- Survivors: 0

On 9 August 2011, Avis-Amur Flight 9209, an Antonov An-12 cargo aircraft of Avis Amur crashed during a domestic flight from Magadan to Keperveyem, Russia, killing all 11 people on board. An engine fire was reported en route and the aircraft crashed while attempting to return to Magadan.

== Accident ==
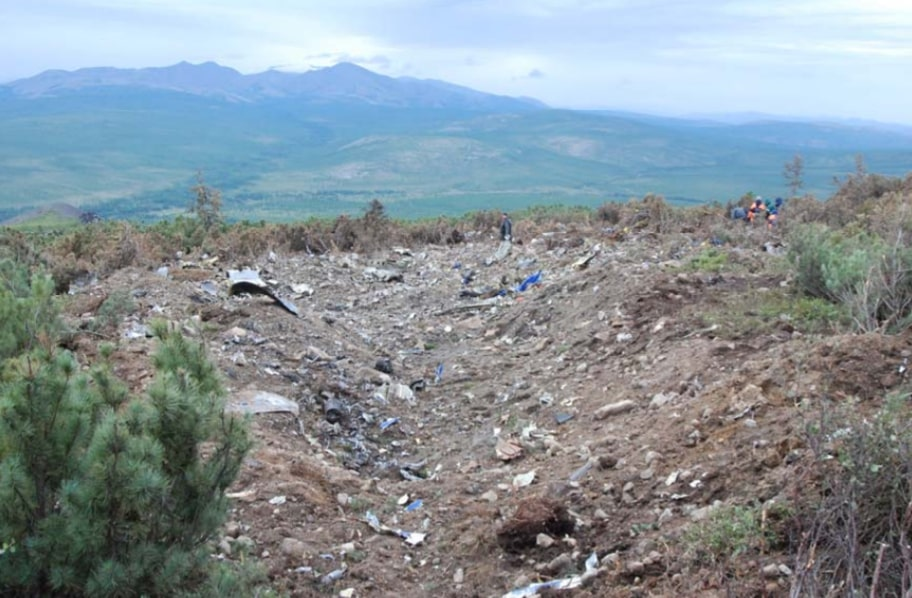
crash site

The aircraft took off from Sokol Airport in Magadan for Keperveyem Airport, carrying nine crew, two passengers, and 17.58 tonnes of cargo. A fuel leak was reported, followed by a report of an engine fire when the Antonov was near the village of Omsukchan, 230 nautical miles (430 km) northeast of Magadan.

The aircraft turned around in an attempt to land back at Magadan, but shortly after disappeared from radar. The An-12 had crashed at a location variously reported to be 45 nautical miles (83 km) or 200 kilometres (110 nmi) from Omsukchan; or about 170 nautical miles (310 km) from Magadan; with the loss of all on board. Fog in the area hampered the search for the aircraft, which crashed in a forest. Debris was spread for 5 kilometres (3.1 mi).

== Aircraft ==
The accident aircraft was a turboprop Antonov An-12AP with registration RA-11125, c/n 3341006. It had first flown in 1963 and at the time of the accident was the oldest Russian registered aircraft flying in commercial service.

== Investigation ==
The Interstate Aviation Committee of the Commonwealth of Independent States opened an investigation into the accident. As a result of the accident, the operation of the Antonov An-12 within Russia was banned until a risk assessment programme had been completed.
