= Aliskerovo =

Aliskerovo Алискерово
- Urban-type settlement (abolished)
- Interactive map of Aliskerovo
- Location of Aliskerovo Aliskerovo (Chukotka Autonomous Okrug)
- Coordinates: 67°46′57″N 167°33′05″E
- Country: Russia
- Federal subject: Chukotka Autonomous Okrug
- Administrative district: Bilibinsky District
- Founded: 1961
- Abolished: 1998

Population
  - Estimate (January 2010): 1 )
- Time zone: UTC+12 (MSK+9)
- Postal code: 689450
- OKTMO ID: 77609701902

Aliskerovo (Russian: Алискерово) is an inhabited locality (an urban-type settlement) in Bilibinsky District of Chukotka Autonomous Okrug, Russia. Its population was recorded as 1, a significant decline from 7 in the 2002 Census and 1,306 (1989 Soviet census).

== Geography ==
Aliskerovo is located southeast of Bilibino, west of the Ilirney Range. The settlement lies east of Keperveyem and the Kyrganay Range. The Chuvanay Range rises to the west and southwest, across the Maly Anyuy River.

== History ==
Aliskerovo was founded in 1961 and was named after Soviet geologist Aziz Aliskerov, who played a key role in the exploration and mapping of mineral resources in the region.

By 1968, the settlement had a population of approximately 2,300 residents. In the late 1990s, local mining operations were deemed economically unviable, and authorities concluded that no alternative economic activity could be developed. As a result, Aliskerovo was officially closed in 1999, along with several other settlements in Chukotka.

Under the provisions of this resolution, the Russian government allocated funds to relocate non-working pensioners and unemployed residents from liquidated settlements, including Aliskerovo, to other regions of Russia. The Ministry of Railways was also required to provide shipping containers for the transport of personal belongings and ensure their delivery to designated destinations.

By 1998, the settlement was largely depopulated. As of 2009, Aliskerovo remained listed among settlements officially undergoing liquidation.

=== Meteorite discovery ===
A meteorite was recovered here on July 10, 1977. The meteorite was discovered in alluvium approximately 200,000 years old. It weighed 58.4 kilograms (129 lb) and was classified by the Natural History Museum as a medium Octahedrite, containing (mineral composition determined by X-ray spectral microanalysis): 9.25% nickel, 0.42% cobalt, and 0.30% phosphorus. Some of its structural features testify to repeated metamorphic influences (impact loads and heating), which occurred during both its extraterrestrial existence and its passage through the atmosphere and fall to Earth including: exhibiting striated kamacite, emulsion-like taenite, and the recrystallization of troilite-daubréelite nodules.

== Demographics ==
The 2002 census data showed the population to consist of five males and two females, though the population had fallen to just 5 by 2005 according to an environmental impact study on the Kupol Gold Project. The population had fallen to just a single person by 2010 according to the official Bilibino District website.

Year	Inhabitants
1970	1245
1979	1170
1989	1306
2002	7
2007	3
2010	0
2011	1

== Transport ==
Aliskerovo is not connected to any other inhabited location by permanent road however, there is a small network of roads within the settlement including:

- Улица 70 лет Октября (Ulitsa 70 let Oktyabrya, lit. 70 Years of October Street)
- Улица Геологов (Ulitsa Geologov, lit. Geologists Street)
- Улица Горняцкая (Ulitsa Gornyatskaya)
- Улица Егорова (Ulitsa Yegorova)
- Улица Полевая (Ulitsa Polevaya, lit. Field Street)
- Улица Проточная (Ulitsa Protochnaya, lit. Flow Street)
- Улица Центральная (Ulitsa Tsentralnaya, lit. Central Street)
- Улица Школьная (Ulitsa Shkolnaya, lit. School Street)

== See also ==
- List of inhabited localities in Bilibinsky District
