= Chukotavia =

Russian airline

Federal State Unitary Enterprise "ChukotAVIA" ФГУП «ЧукотАВИА»
IATA	ICAO	Call sign
–	ADZ	CHUKOTAVIA
- Founded: 1 September 1996
- Hubs: Anadyr Ugolny Airport
- Fleet size: 4
- Headquarters: Anadyr
- Key people: Tomash Troyanovsky (General Director)
- Website: http://chukotavia.com/

ChukotAVIA (Russian: ЧукотАВИА, short for Чукотские авиалинии; English: Chukotka Airlines) is an airline based in Anadyr, Chukotka Autonomous Okrug, Russia. It operates passenger, cargo, and utility services. Its main base is Anadyr Ugolny Airport. As of February 2025, it is banned from flying into the EU.

== History ==
The airline was established and started operations in 1996. It was formed by the merger of Anadyr and Chaunski Air Enterprises. It is owned by Anadyr Air Enterprise, Keperveyem Air Enterprise, Mys Shmidta Air Enterprise and Pevek Air Enterprise. In 2020, it became part of Aurora, Russia's single far-eastern airline, along with four other airlines.

== Fleet ==
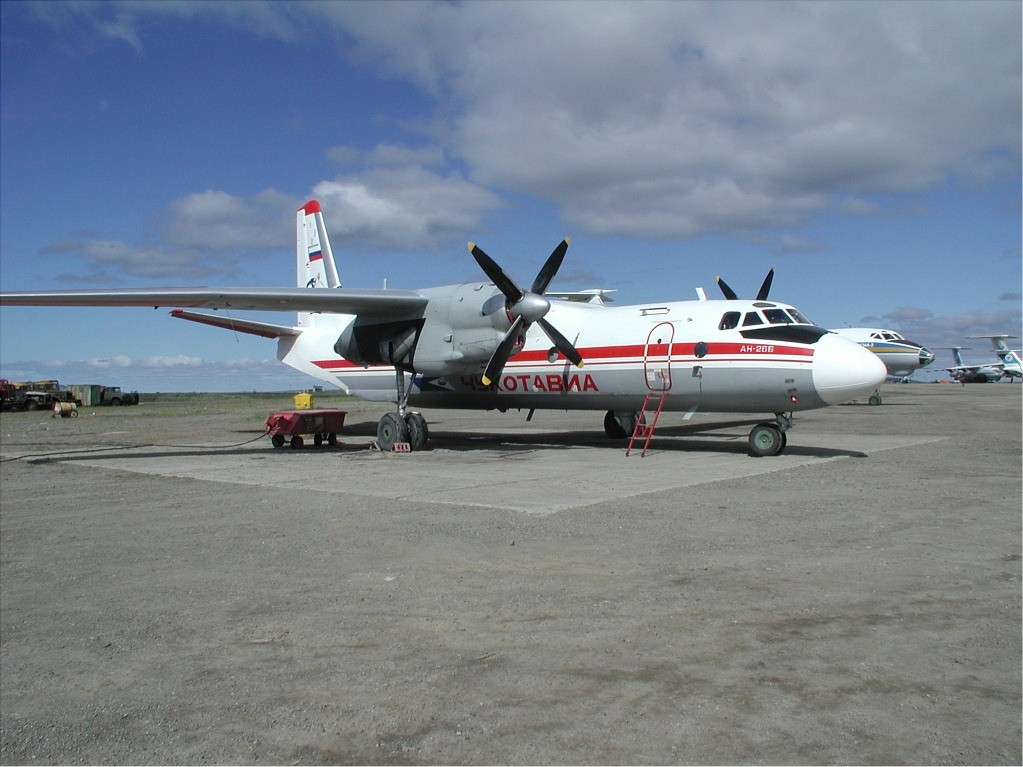
Antonov An-26 at Ugolny Airport

=== Current fleet ===
As of August 2025, Chukotavia operates the following aircraft:

Aircraft	In service	Orders	Passengers	Notes
De Havilland Canada DHC-6-400 Twin Otter	4	—		
Total	4			

=== Fleet upgrade ===
In 2014, Chukotavia leased two DHC-6-400 Twin Otter turboprop aircraft to replace helicopters on its regional flights, with additional two aircraft purchased in 2015.

=== Former fleet ===
The airline previously operated the following aircraft:

- 1 Antonov An-24RV
- 3 Antonov An-26
- 1 further De Havilland Canada DHC-6-400 Twin Otter
- 10 Mil Mi-8

== Destinations ==
- Anadyr Ugolny Airport
- Beringovsky Airport, Beringovsky
- Keperveyem Airport, Bilibino
- Kresta Bay Airport, Egvekinot
- Lavrentiya Airport
- Markovo Airport
- Pevek Airport
- Provideniya Bay Airport
- Vayegi
