= Pevek Airport =

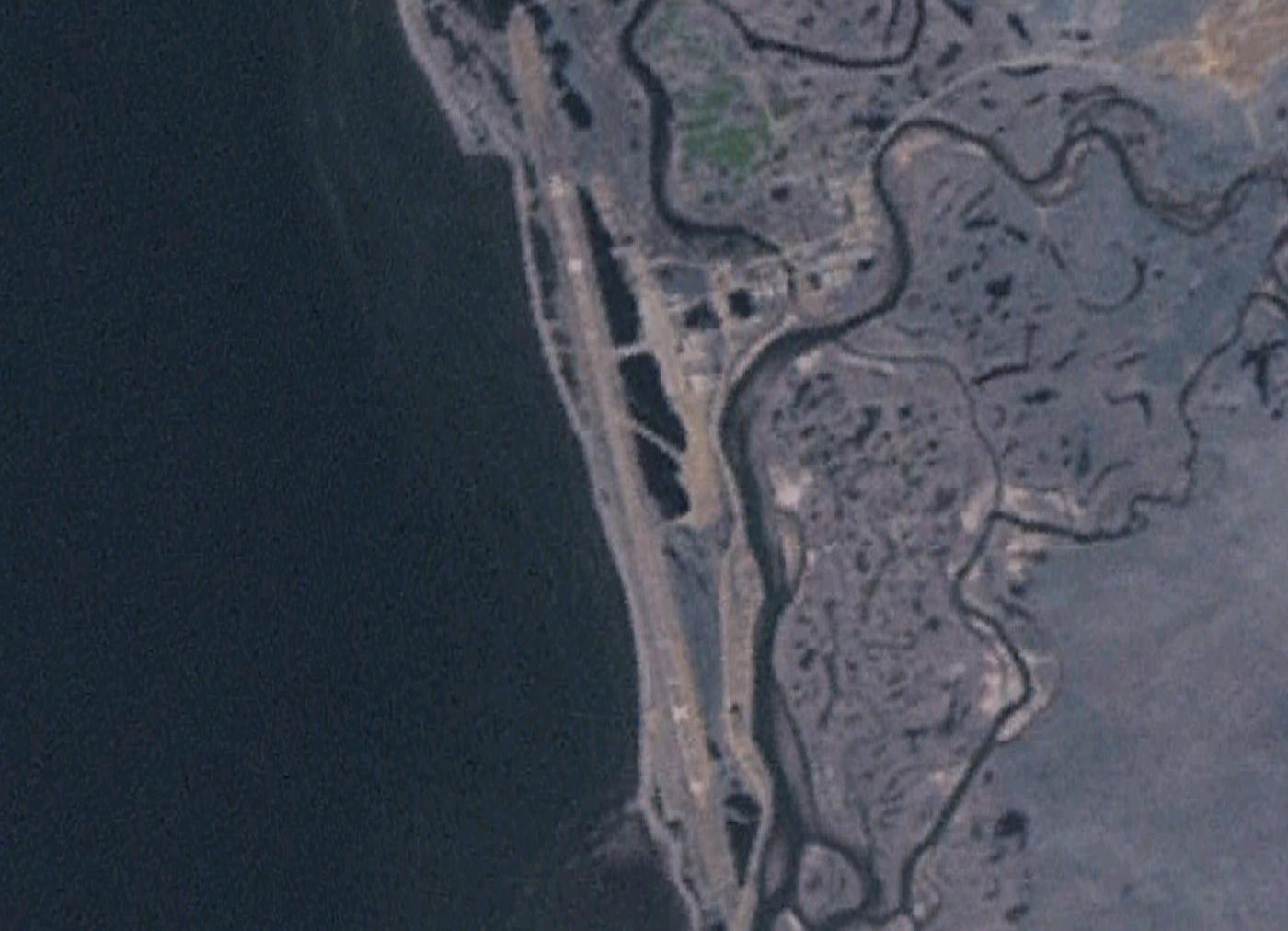
- IATA: PWE; ICAO: UHMP; LID: ПЕВ

Summary
- Airport type: Public
- Operator: Pevek branch of Chukotavia
- Serves: Pevek
- Location: Pevek, Russia
- Elevation AMSL: 10 ft / 3 m
- Coordinates: 69°47′0″N 170°35′48″E
- Interactive map of Pevek Airport

Runways
Direction	Length		Surface
Direction	ft	m	Surface
17/35	8,202	2,500	Concrete

Pevek Airport (Russian: Аэропорт Певек) (IATA: PWE, ICAO: UHMP) is a civilian airport located 15 km northeast of Pevek. It is located on the coast of the East Siberian Sea, and it is one of the few airports in Russia on the polar route capable of handling aircraft as large as the Boeing 767, and, in case of emergency, even larger planes.

It mainly serves medium-sized airliners. Its use for military operations is unknown, but the runway and facilities are adequate for interceptor operations. The airfield elevation is given either as 13 or 14 meters according to various Department of Defense navigation charts.

== Airlines and destinations ==
The airport operates infrequent, usually weekly, service to Moscow, as well as flights to regional airports. There are no scheduled flights on most days. Flights to Moscow are operated by a Boeing 757 and Boeing 767, and flights to Anadyr and Keperveyem are operated by a Twin Otter, An-24 or helicopter.

Airlines	Destinations
Chukotavia	Anadyr, Keperveyem
S7 Airlines	Novosibirsk
Yakutia Airlines	Moscow–Vnukovo, Nizhnevartovsk, Yakutsk

== Accidents and incidents ==
- On 12 March 1963, a Li-2 registered CCCP-16202 crashed immediately after takeoff due to overloading. The aircraft was written off.
- On 14 August 2014, a Mi-8 helicopter registered RA-24738 collided with the terminal during taxiing, hitting the building with its rotor.

== See also ==
- List of airports in Russia
