= Markovo Airport =

Airport in Russia

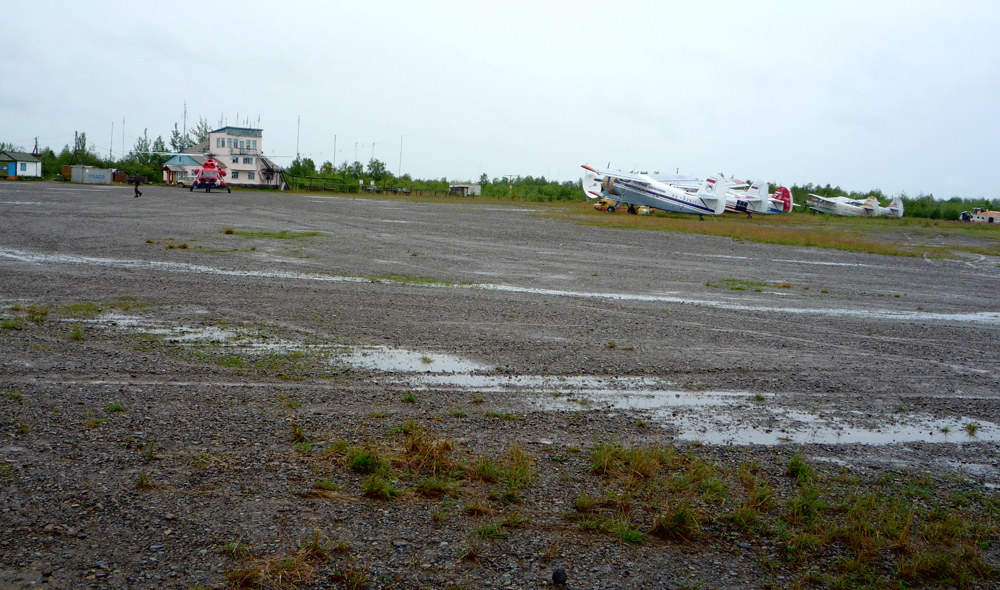
- IATA: KVM; ICAO: UHMO; LID: МКО

Summary
- Airport type: Public
- Serves: Markovo, Chukotka Autonomous Okrug, Russia
- Coordinates: 64°39′55″N 170°24′51″E

Maps
- Chukotka Autonomous Okrug in Russia

- Location of the airport in the Chukotka district

Runways
Direction	Length		Surface
Direction	m	ft	Surface
09/27	2,400	7,874	gravel
- Sources: GCM STV

Markovo Airport (Russian: Аэропорт Марково) (IATA: KVM) is an airport located in Markovo, in the Chukotka autonomous district of Russia. Starting in the 1940s, Markovo was one of eight stops on the backbone Aeroflot passenger route from Moscow to Anadyr.

== Military history ==
By 1951, US intelligence reported that an airfield for Tupolev Tu-4 bombers was being constructed at Markovo. However the Soviet Union chose instead to build several bomber staging bases along the northern coast, which could be better supplied by the Northern Sea Route. US intelligence continued to monitor Markovo as a possible Tupolev Tu-22M (Backfire) staging base as late as 1980.

== Airlines and destinations ==
Airlines	Destinations
Chukotavia	Anadyr

== See also ==
- List of airports in Russia
