= Bilibino Nuclear Power Plant =

Power plant in Bilibino, Chukotka, Russia

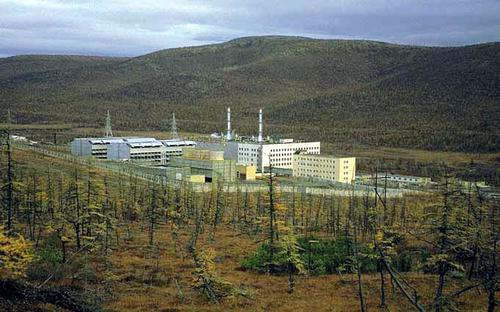
- Country: Russia
- Location: Bilibino, Chukotka
- Coordinates: 68°3′1″N 166°32′19″E
- Status: Decommissioned
- Commission date: 1974
- Decommission date: 31 December 2025
- Operator: Rosenergoatom

Nuclear power station
- Reactor type: EGP-6

Power generation
- Units decommissioned: 4 x 12 MW
- Nameplate capacity: 36 MW
- Capacity factor: 39.2%
- Annual net output: 164.8 GW·h

External links
- Website: bilnpp.rosenergoatom.ru
- Commons: Related media on Commons

The Bilibino Nuclear Power Plant (Russian: Билибинская АЭС []) was a power plant in Bilibino, Chukotka Autonomous Okrug, Russia. The plant was equipped with four EGP-6 reactors and was the smallest and the second northernmost operating nuclear power plant in the world. The first reactor was shut down in March 2018, and the other three units in December 2025. It is expected that all used nuclear fuel will be removed by 2042 and the site to be fully rehabilitated by 2055. It has been replaced by the floating nuclear power station Akademik Lomonosov.

== Radiation exposure ==
As of 2012, the EGP-6 reactors at the plant exposed personnel and staff on average to 3.7 mSv/year. This made up 18.5% of the 20 mSv/year designated radiation workers can receive. The exposure by the Bilibino Nuclear Power Plant was higher than the average for Russian nuclear power plants which sits at 1.26 mSv/year.

== Improvements after the Fukushima-Daiichi accident ==
Following the 2011 Fukushima nuclear disaster, measures were taken to ensure safety and emergency responses for Russian nuclear power plants. These plants included RBMK, BN, WWER-440, WWER-1000, and EGP reactors. For nuclear power plants with EGP's, mobile pumping sets, motor-driven pumps, 0.2 MW mobile diesel generator units (MDGU), and 2 MW diesel generator plants (MDGP) had been supplied for mobile emergency response. Seismic protection systems (SSP) were introduced. The "Management Guide for Beyond Design Basis Accidents at RBMK NPPs Including Severe Accidents", a guide for prevention and mitigation for an accidents concerning graphite-moderated reactors, was revised with the incidents of Fukushima in mind.
