= Pevek =

Pevek Певек Пээкин / Пээк (Chukchi)
- Town
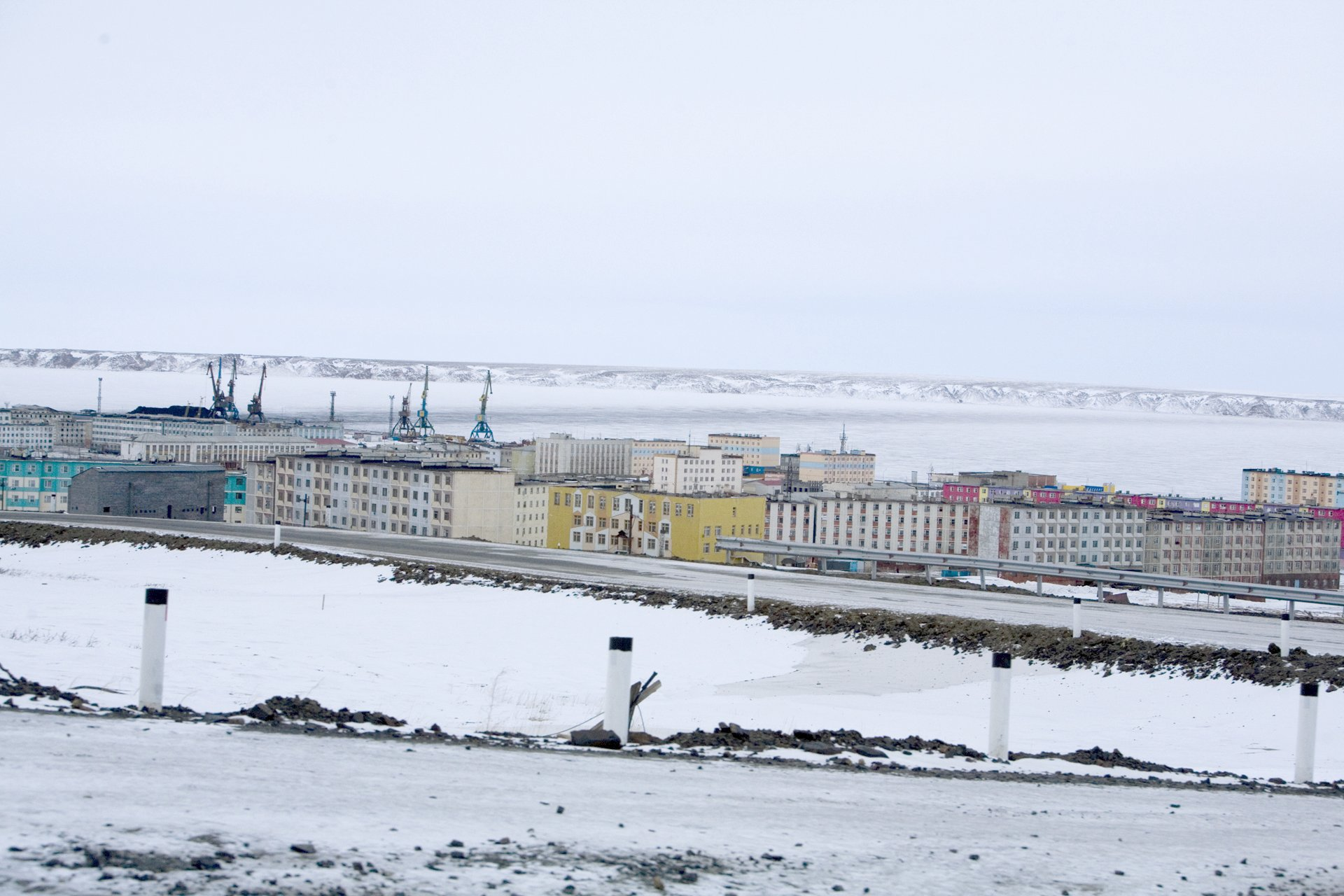
- View of Pevek from the south

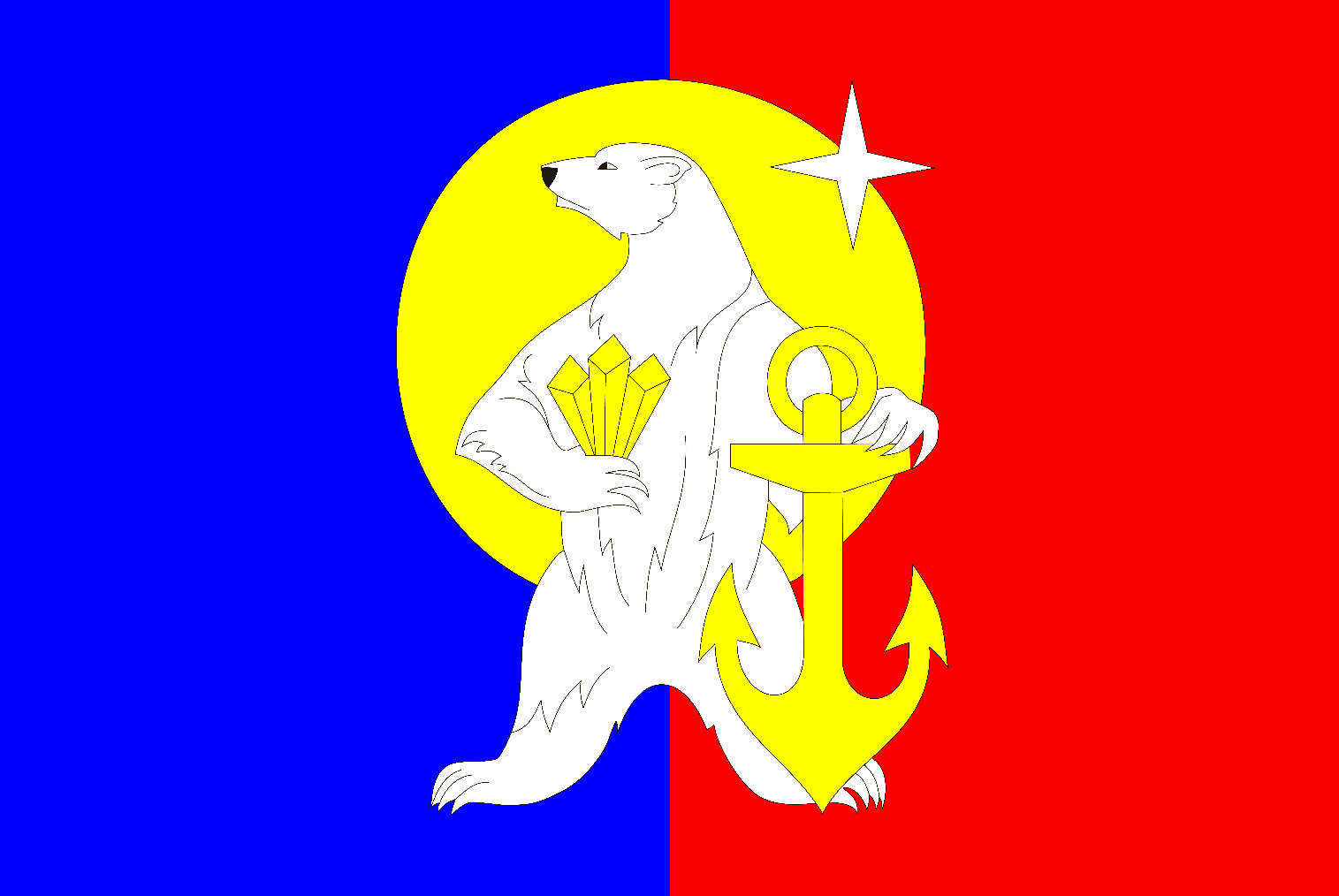
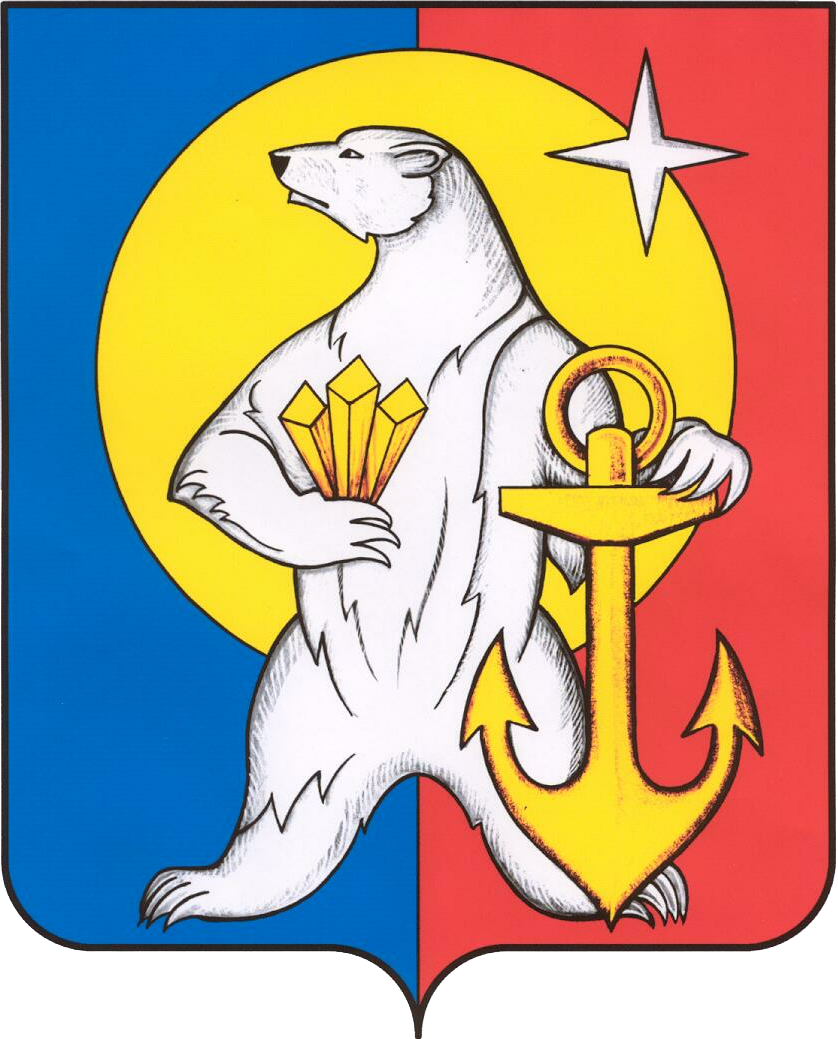
- Flag Coat of arms
- Interactive map of Pevek
- Location of Pevek Pevek (Chukotka Autonomous Okrug)
- Coordinates: 69°42′N 170°17′E
- Country: Russia
- Federal subject: Chukotka Autonomous Okrug
- Administrative district: Chaunsky District
- First mentioned: 1926
- Town status since: April 6, 1967

Government
  - Head: Viktoriya Klunichenko
- Elevation: 20 m (66 ft)

Population (2010 Census)
  - Total: 4,162
  - Estimate (January 2016): 4,743 (+14%)

Administrative status
  - Capital of: Chaunsky District

Municipal status
  - Municipal district: Chaunsky Municipal District
  - Urban settlement: Pevek Urban Settlement
  - Capital of: Chaunsky Municipal District, Pevek Urban Settlement
- Time zone: UTC+12 (MSK+9)
- Postal code: 689400
- Dialing code: +7 42737
- OKTMO ID: 77705000001

Pevek (Russian: Певе́к; Chukchi: Пээкин / Пээк, Pèèkin / Pèèk) is an Arctic port town and the administrative center of Chaunsky District in Chukotka Autonomous Okrug, Russia, located on Chaunskaya Bay (part of the East Siberian Sea) on a peninsula on the eastern side of the bay facing the Routan Islands, above the Arctic Circle, about 640 kilometers (400 mi) northwest of Anadyr, the administrative center of the autonomous okrug. Population: 4,015 (2021 census); 4,162 (2010 census); 5,206 (2002 census); 12,915 (1989 Soviet census).

Historical population
Year	Pop.	±%
1939	426	—
1959	5,752	+1250.2%
1970	10,528	+83.0%
1979	11,060	+5.1%
1989	12,915	+16.8%
2002	5,206	−59.7%
2010	4,162	−20.1%
2021	4,015	−3.5%
Source: Census data

Pevek is a modern settlement established after World War I to provide a port for the export of minerals as part of the expanding Northern Sea Route. During the 1940s and 1950s, the area surrounding Pevek was the site of several gulags where prisoners mined uranium. In recent years, many of the mines became unprofitable and have closed, causing many residents to move to more central regions in Russia and the port infrastructure to decay.

Pevek is the present location of the Akademik Lomonosov floating nuclear power plant, which carries two marine-type KLT-40S nuclear reactors generating 35 megawatts of electricity each.

== Etymology ==
There are two theories for the origin of the town's name. The first is that it is derived from the Chukchi word for fat; it was originally named for the nearby hill Peekin'ey, meaning "swollen mountain". The more macabre theory is that the name is derived from the Chukchi word "Pagytkenay", meaning "smelly mountain". Legend has it that a battle was fought on the site of the modern town between the local Chukchi and Yukaghir peoples. At the time, there was no tradition of burying the dead among the indigenous people, so the odor of rotting flesh was present for a long time. This legend suggests a reason, why when Russian explorers first discovered the bay, they did not find any settlement, as the Chukchi refused to settle in the region following the battle and only brought their animals to pasture in the summer.

== History ==
=== 18th and 19th centuries ===
The area around Pevek was already known to Russians by the mid-18th century, as the records of the Great Northern Expedition document the discovery of Cape Shelag. Further references to the cape were made in the records of the Billings expedition, with Russian explorers first describing Chaunskaya Bay in the 1760s.

=== 20th century ===
The earliest records of the settlement of Pevek were made by the writer Tikhon Semushkin, who discovered a Chukchi hunting lodge and yaranga in 1926. By the mid-1930s, Pevek became an important port in the region, due to the natural harbor provided by Chaunskaya Bay, the expansion of the Northern Sea Route, and the discovery of tin at the Pyrkakay mine (which would later be renamed Krasnoarmeysky) 60 kilometers (37 mi) away. The discovery of minerals throughout this region meant Pevek had an important part to play in importing the required plant and machinery and exporting the extracted minerals and by 1950, the settlement had nearly 1,500 permanent residents. On April 6, 1967, Pevek was granted town status.

During the 1990s, after the dissolution of the Soviet Union, the town's population dropped by more than half as commercial navigation in the Arctic declined, and people began to gravitate towards the central Russian regions. More or less regular shipping is presently to be found only from Murmansk to Dudinka in the west and between Vladivostok and Pevek in the east. Ports between Dudinka and Pevek have virtually no shipping.

=== Gulag ===
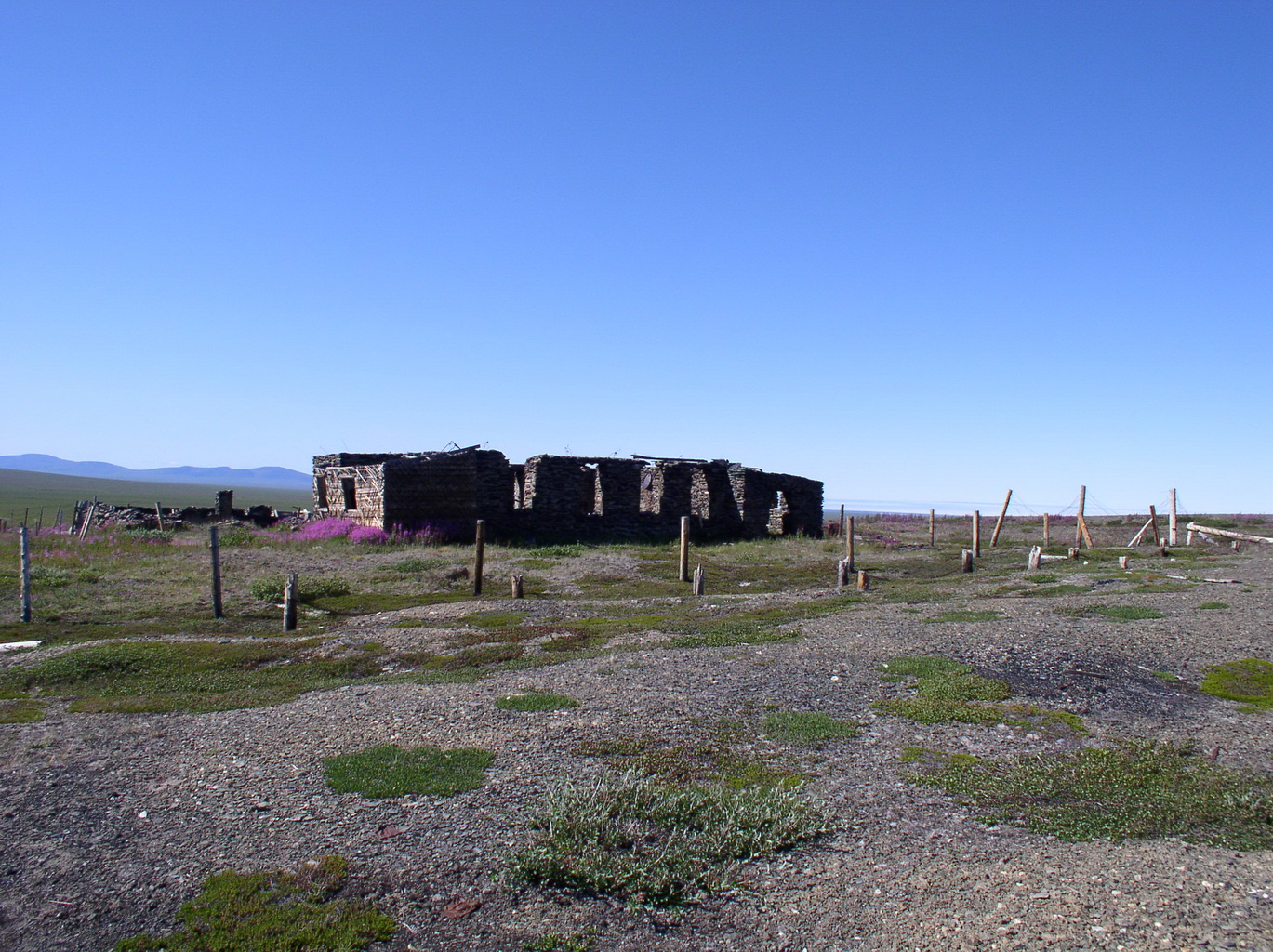
Remains of Chaunlag buildings near Pevek

The workforce for the mines that provided the Soviet Union with tin and uranium throughout the large parts of the 20th century were prisoners in the Gulag system. There was a network of camps in the region itself, through which an uncertain number of criminal and political prisoners passed. There are the remains of two large camps, "North" and "West", which continued to supply uranium during and after World War II. Barracks dot the landscape and have the appearance of being hastily abandoned. Large graveyards on the edge of the various encampments show that a large proportion of those sent to work in the mines did not survive.

== Administrative and municipal status ==
Within the framework of administrative divisions, Pevek serves as the administrative center of Chaunsky District, to which it is directly subordinated. As a municipal division, the town of Pevek is, together with two rural localities (the selos of Apapelgino and Yanranay) incorporated within Chaunsky Municipal District as Pevek Urban Settlement.

== Climate ==
Pevek has a tundra climate (Köppen ET), with long, very cold winters, and short, cool summers. February is the coldest month, with average temperature of −27.5 °C (−17.5 °F), while July, with +8.7 °C (47.7 °F), is the warmest. Although the average temperature for July is below +10.0 °C (50.0 °F), sometimes it may be several degrees warmer with a record high average of +15.7 °C (60.3 °F) for July 2007. Sometimes, but very rarely, it happens that the lowest night temperature stays above +20.0 °C (68.0 °F), which is characteristic for subtropical areas with very mild climates. The lowest temperature ever recorded was −50.0 °C (−58.0 °F) on February 7, 8 and 10, 1978, and the highest was +29.2 °C (84.6 °F) on July 8, 2010.

Climate data for Pevek
Month	Jan	Feb	Mar	Apr	May	Jun	Jul	Aug	Sep	Oct	Nov	Dec	Year
Record high °C (°F)	8.9 (48.0)	5.6 (42.1)	5.8 (42.4)	8.6 (47.5)	18.7 (65.7)	27.0 (80.6)	29.2 (84.6)	25.7 (78.3)	20.3 (68.5)	14.5 (58.1)	8.0 (46.4)	8.9 (48.0)	29.2 (84.6)
Mean daily maximum °C (°F)	−22.3 (−8.1)	−22.7 (−8.9)	−17.2 (1.0)	−10.3 (13.5)	1.0 (33.8)	10.7 (51.3)	13.4 (56.1)	10.9 (51.6)	6.0 (42.8)	−2.9 (26.8)	−11.8 (10.8)	−19.8 (−3.6)	−5.4 (22.3)
Daily mean °C (°F)	−25.6 (−14.1)	−26.2 (−15.2)	−21.4 (−6.5)	−14.3 (6.3)	−2.2 (28.0)	6.1 (43.0)	9.0 (48.2)	7.8 (46.0)	3.9 (39.0)	−4.7 (23.5)	−14.7 (5.5)	−22.8 (−9.0)	−8.8 (16.2)
Mean daily minimum °C (°F)	−28.9 (−20.0)	−29.6 (−21.3)	−25.6 (−14.1)	−18.9 (−2.0)	−5.6 (21.9)	2.3 (36.1)	5.5 (41.9)	5.0 (41.0)	1.9 (35.4)	−6.6 (20.1)	−17.9 (−0.2)	−25.9 (−14.6)	−12.0 (10.4)
Record low °C (°F)	−45 (−49)	−50 (−58)	−43.3 (−45.9)	−41 (−42)	−30 (−22)	−10.6 (12.9)	−2.2 (28.0)	−5.1 (22.8)	−12.7 (9.1)	−29.3 (−20.7)	−39.7 (−39.5)	−40.6 (−41.1)	−50 (−58)
Average precipitation mm (inches)	18.0 (0.71)	12.9 (0.51)	9.0 (0.35)	8.7 (0.34)	9.1 (0.36)	19.0 (0.75)	36.0 (1.42)	34.0 (1.34)	26.0 (1.02)	21.0 (0.83)	16.0 (0.63)	14.0 (0.55)	223.7 (8.81)
Average rainy days	0	0	0.1	0.1	2	7	13	12	10	1	0.3	0	45.5
Average snowy days	18	18	15	14	12	5	3	3	12	20	17	19	156
Average relative humidity (%)	83	81	81	83	79	74	76	79	80	80	84	83	80
Source: Pogoda.ru.net

== Economy ==
=== Port ===
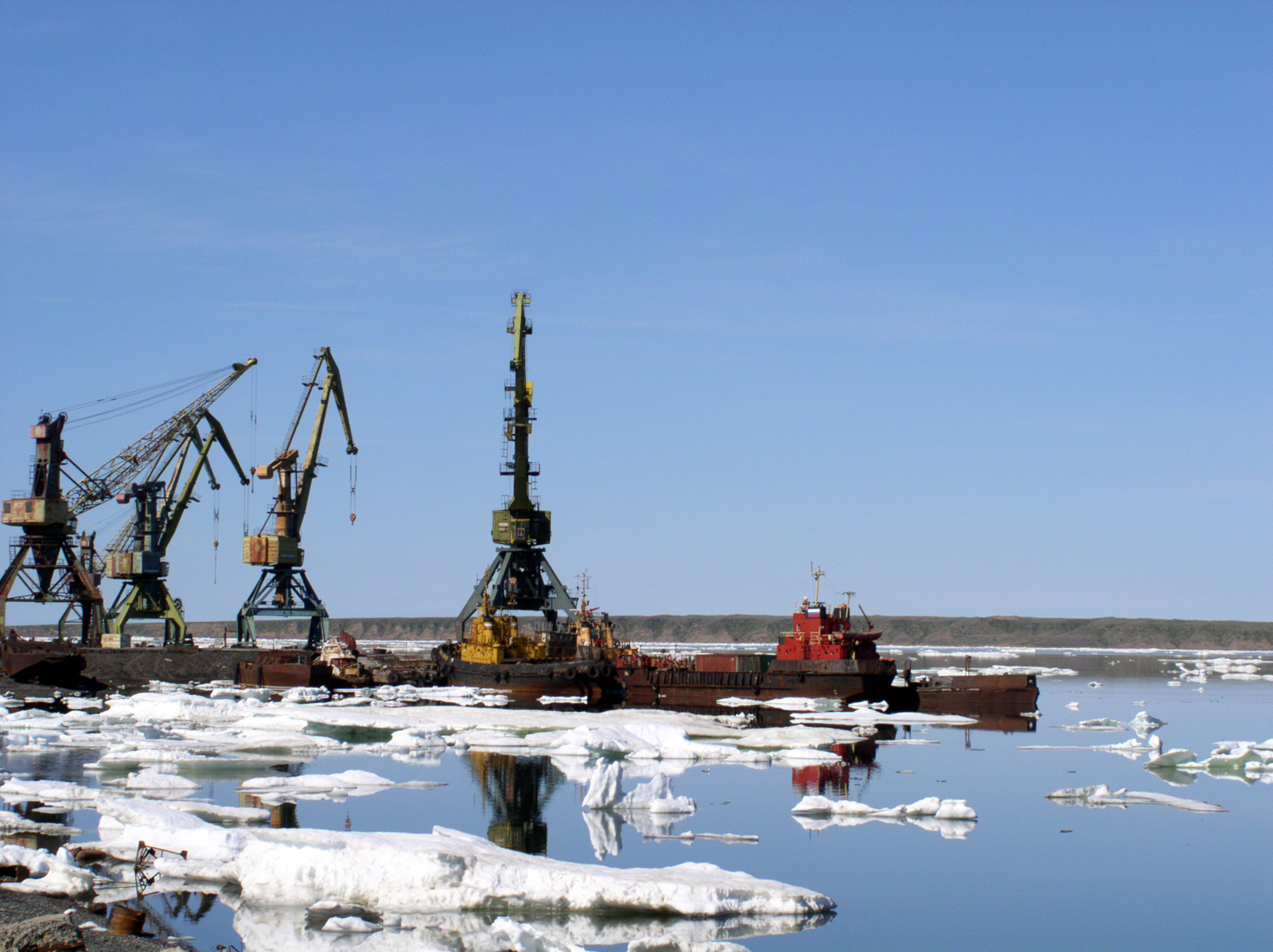
View of Pevek port

The town is a large port on the Northern Sea Route, the most important northern port in Chukotka, although shipping levels have dropped significantly in recent years. The port is the eastern base of the northern sea route's Marine Operations Headquarters, run by the Far East Shipping Company (FESCO) from an icebreaker in the harbor, though the port is still owned by the Russian Ministry of Transport. The port's authority stretches as far as 125° east, just west of the Lena River. Past this point, the western Marine Operations Headquarters, in Dikson, has control. The headquarters govern all routes that ships take when using the northern sea route, organizing convoys and providing up-to-date information on ice conditions throughout their sphere of influence. Apart from FESCO, the port is also used by the Arctic Shipping Company, based in Tiksi, who take coal from Zheleny Mys to Pevek.

Despite its prominence as the eastern Marine Operations Headquarters, the level of cargo the port has had to deal with in recent years has been declining rapidly. Although there is still gold mining around Bilibino and Leningradsky, there is little in the way of cargo generation as a result of that industry. The port is not a significant exporter of goods at all and is mainly responsible for dealing with the import of fuel (coal from Beringovsky and oil from Europe and the United States) for the region, though in the second half of the 1990s even this activity rarely exceeded a few thousand tons, and in 1997, Mys Shmidta, traditionally the second most important of the northern Chukotkan ports, was handling nearly four times as much cargo. The future does not look promising either, and although mining for other materials such as tin still occurs in the region, many of the mines have closed, being deemed unprofitable, and a number of settlements, such as Iultin, Komsomolsky, and Krasnoarmeysky have been depopulated, with any remaining economic activity producing only very low cargo volumes at best.

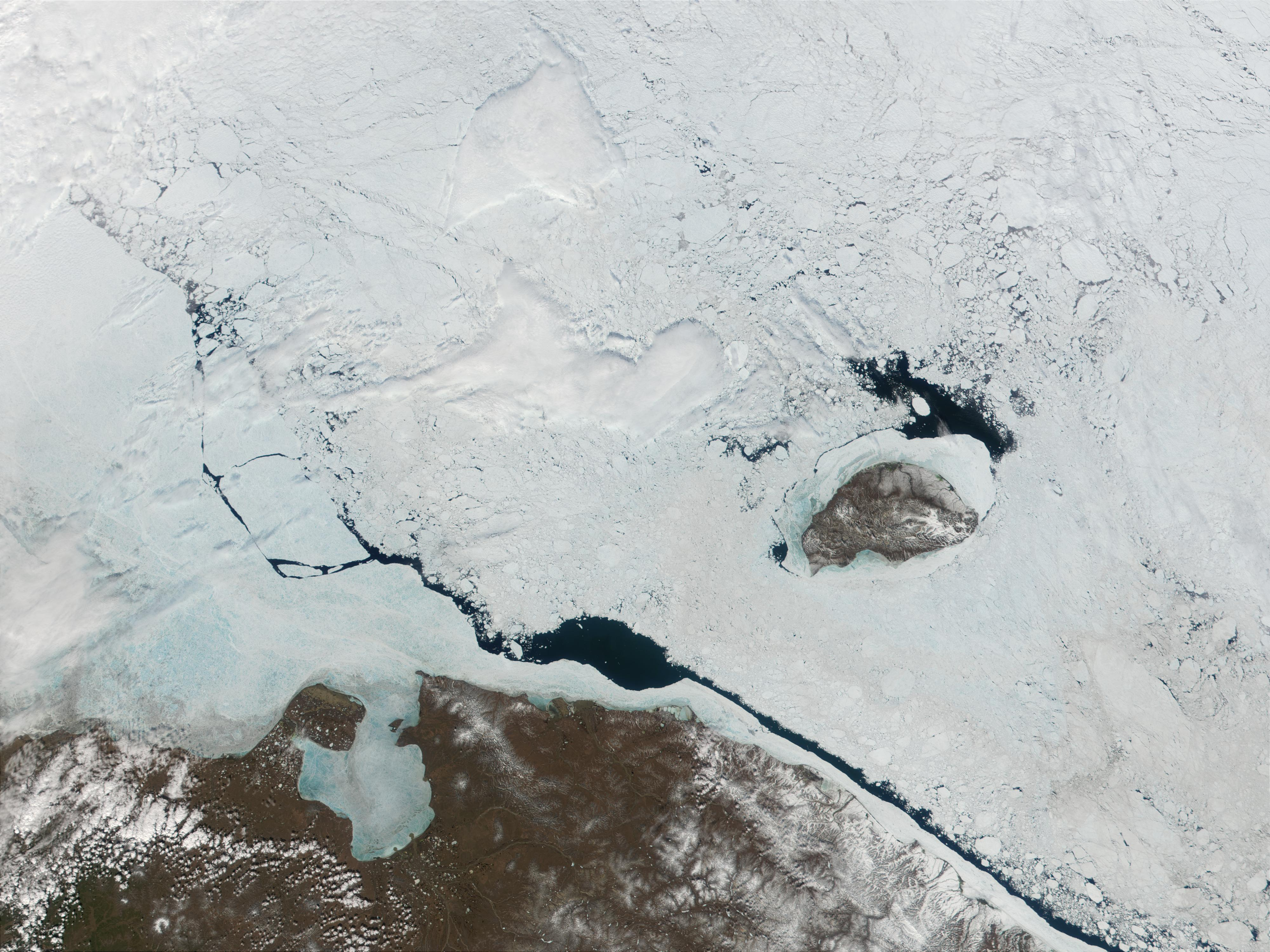
Chaunskaya Bay under ice. Pevek Peninsula is visible on the east side of the Bay. To the northeast is Wrangel Island.

The result of the closing of the mines in the region is that many people have moved to other regions of Russia. This has caused the almost complete eradication of an export market as well as a corresponding drop in the required level of imports. This causes a lack of demand for the facilities at the port whose precarious profitability leads to a lack of investment. This decaying infrastructure is endemic across the northern sea route and makes the supply route unreliable. For example, winter fuel bound for Pevek did not arrive until the end of November in 1998; this is for a port whose average sailing season lasts only until October 25.

A slight recovery is perhaps indicated by an increase in cargo handled. In 1997, Pevek handled over 200,000 tons of cargo, second only to Dudinka of the true northern sea route ports, with 1,143,000 tons.

The port has a maximum ship draft of 10.25 meters (33.6 ft).

=== Other industry ===
There is some mining in the area; tin, mercury, gold, and black coal deposits are all located near the town. However, many of the mines that previously produced significant quantities of minerals for export have been deemed to become unprofitable and have closed. Most mining that takes place in the region is relatively low key. However, this level of activity is still sufficient to provide enough business to keep two processing plants in Pevek.

A floating nuclear power plant, Akademik Lomonosov, is located in Pevek. It started commercial operation in May 2020. It has two small reactors that generate 35 megawatts of electricity each.

=== Transportation ===
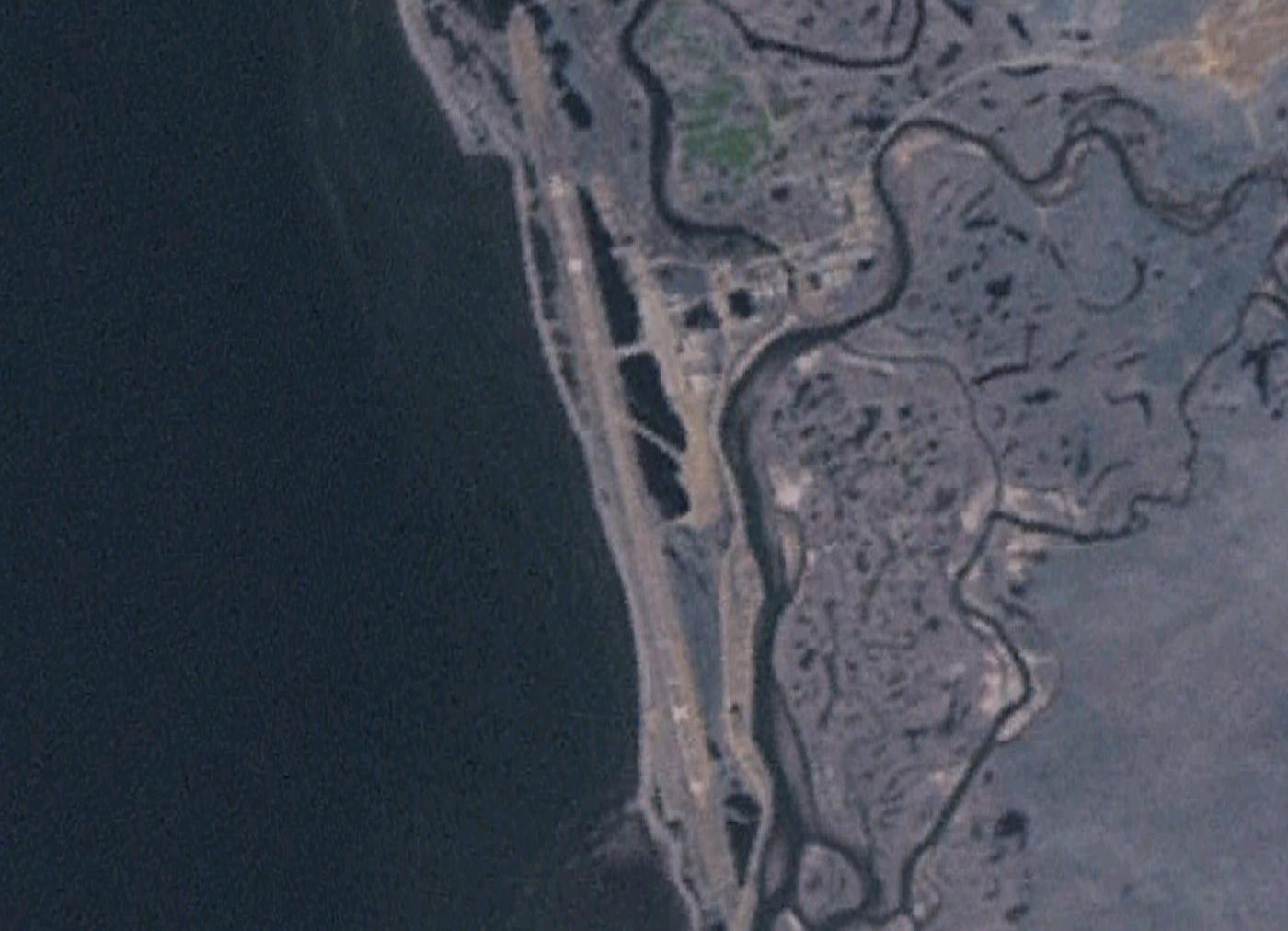
Pevek Airport seen from the air

Besides the port as a key transport link with the rest of Russia, the town is also served by the Pevek Airport, located 17 kilometers (11 mi) to the northeast of the town in the village of Apapelgino, a locality established specifically to house the airport's staff. The airport provides flights to major regional centers such as Anadyr and Bilibino, as well as to Moscow.

Pevek also has the most developed road infrastructure in the autonomous okrug. There is approximately 150 kilometers (93 mi) of year-round, paved roads going to local destinations such as the now abandoned settlement of Valkumey and the mines at Komsomolsky and Krasnoarmeysky. There is also an ice road to Bilibino.

== In literature ==
Pevek is described as the place of death of Edith Abramovna in Varlam Shalamov's short story "Descendant of a Decembrist".

== Gallery ==
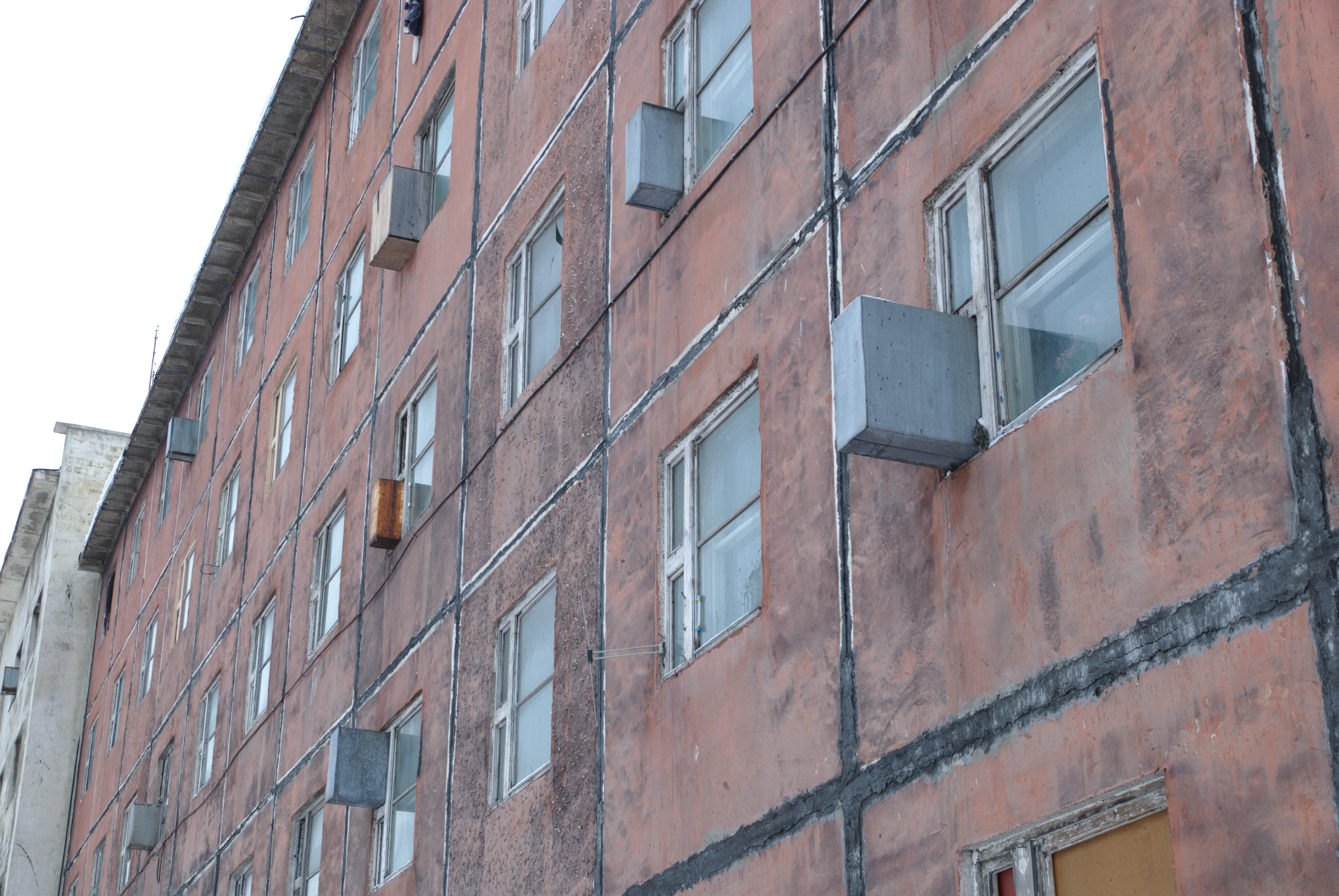
Apartment building in Pevek

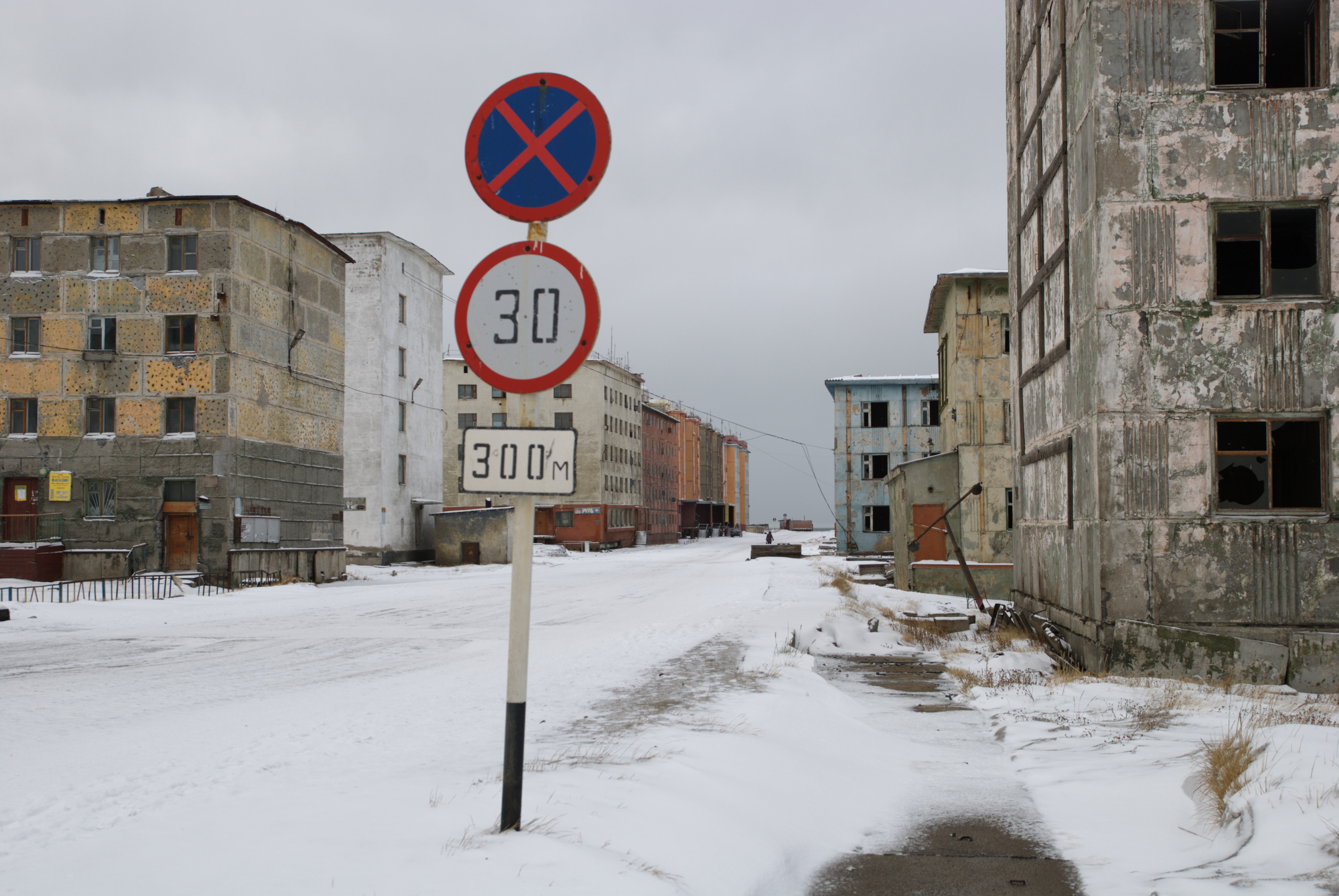
Abandoned buildings in Pevek

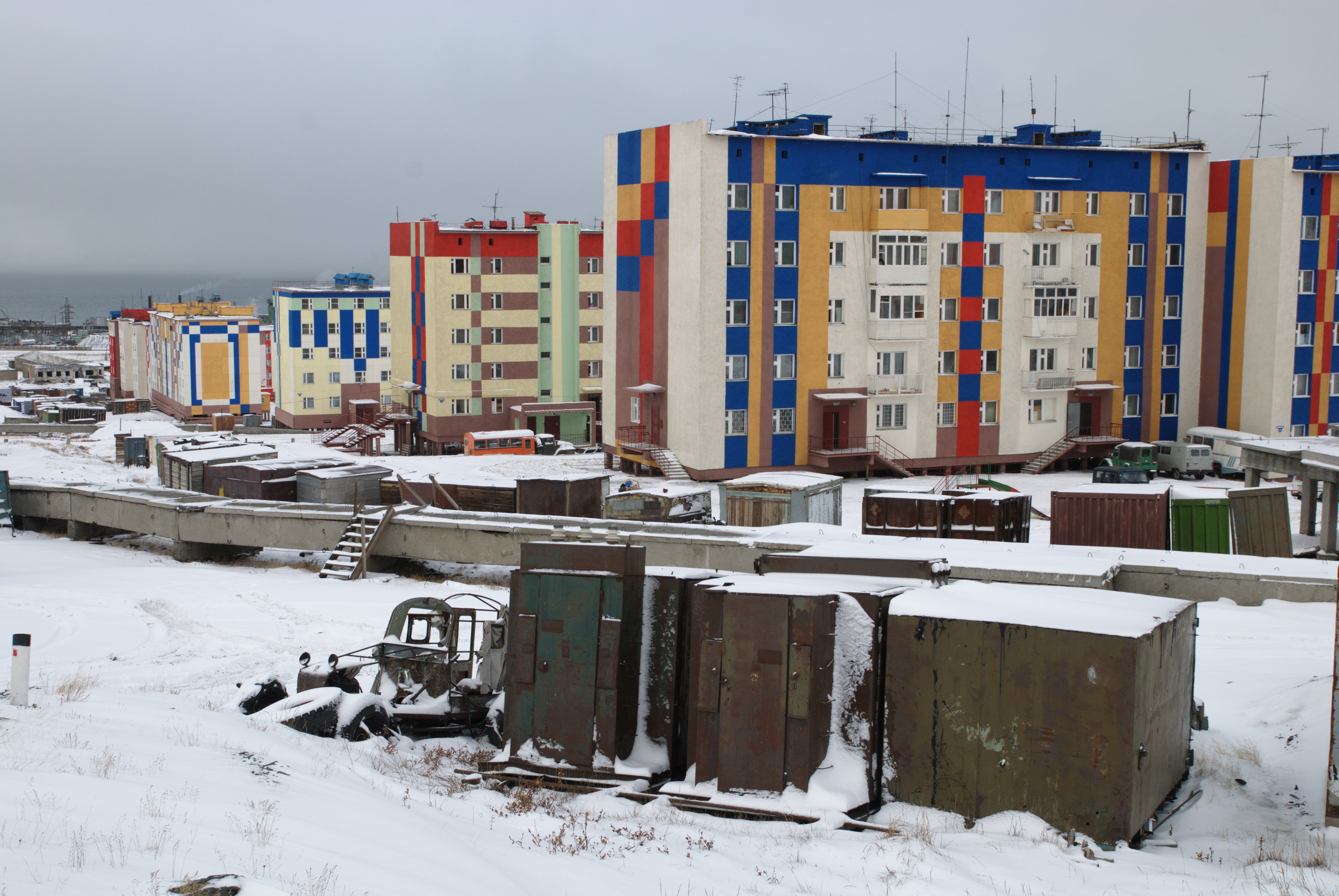
Renovated buildings in Pevek

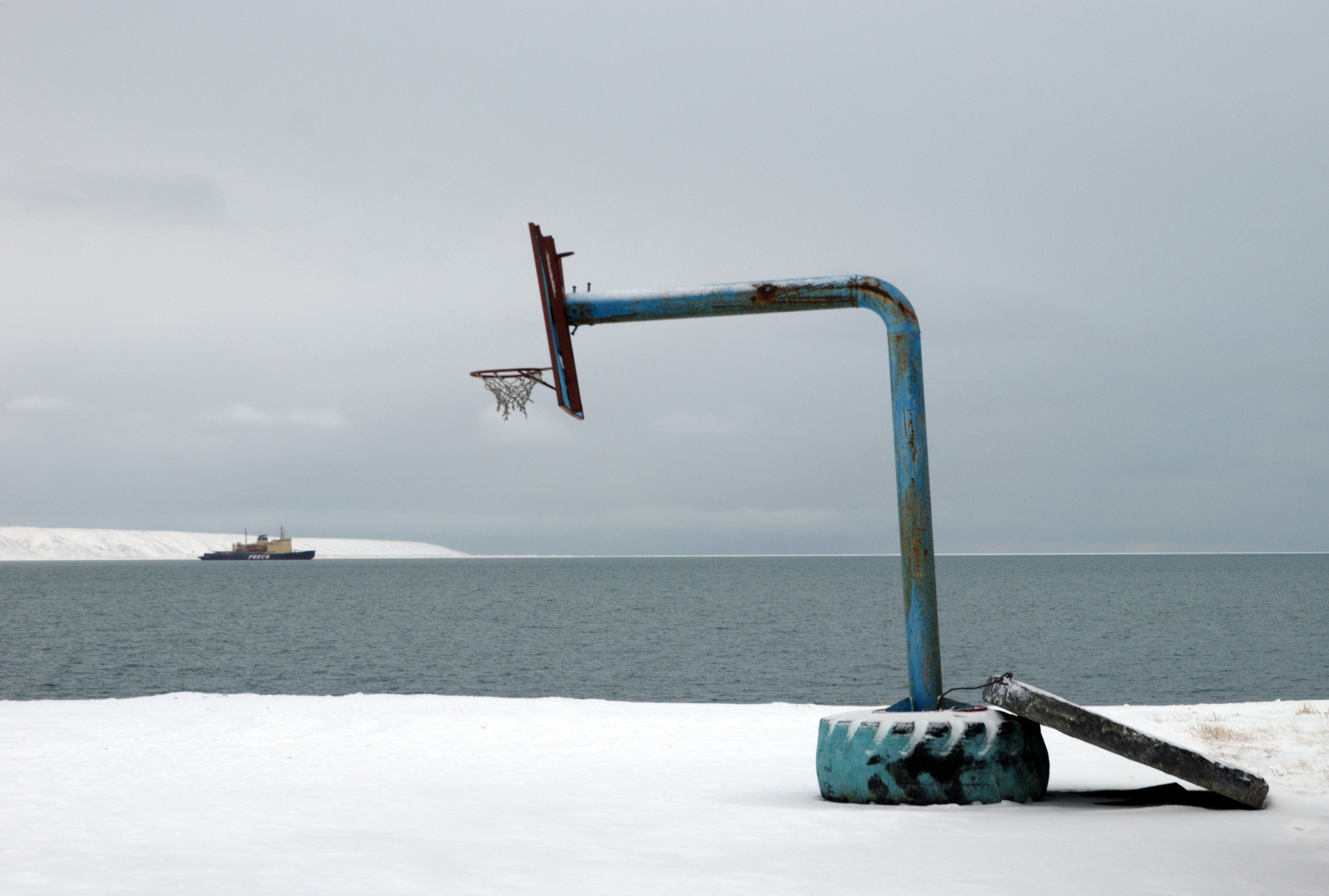
Basketball court in Pevek

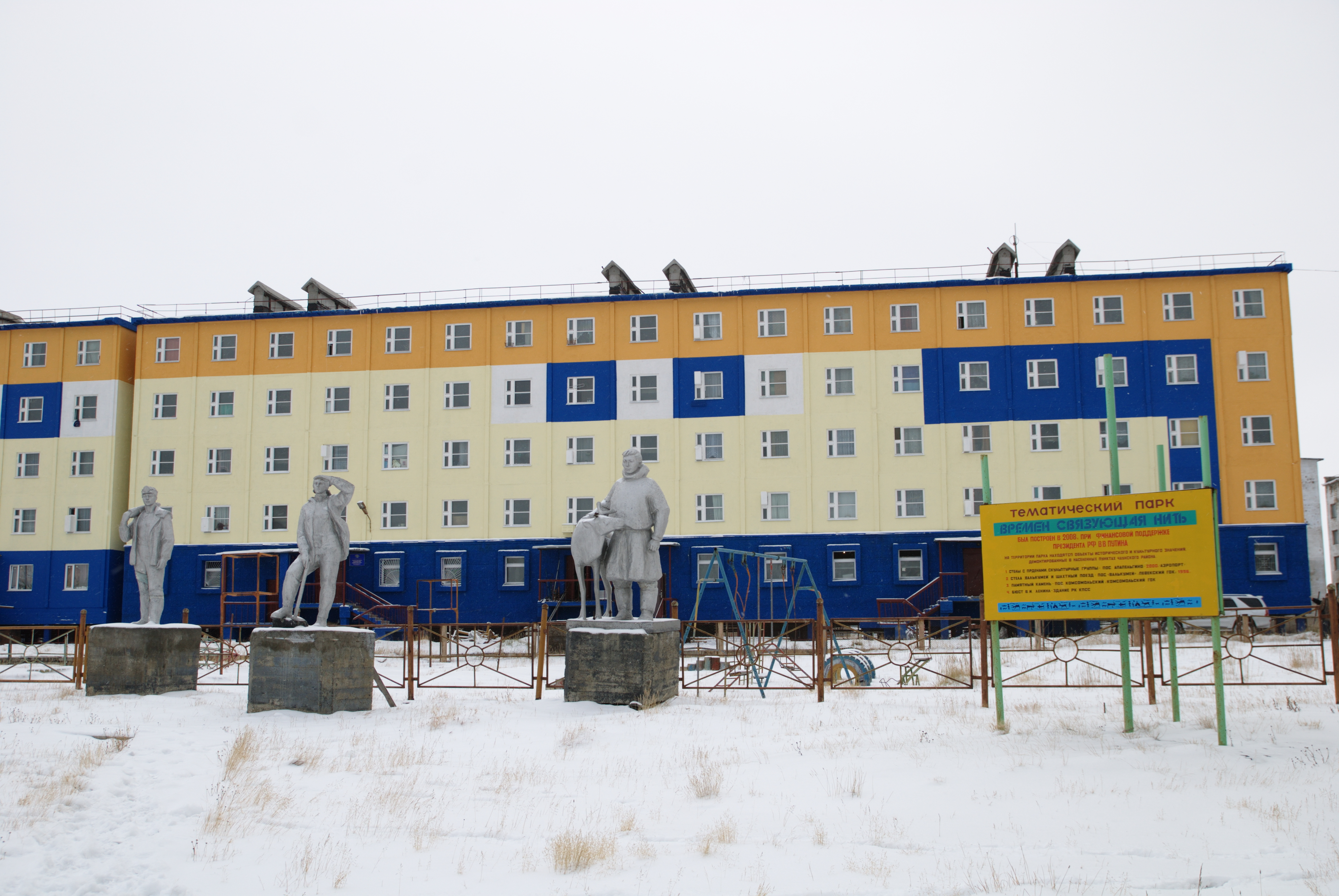
Soviet monuments brought from the settlements of Chaun area

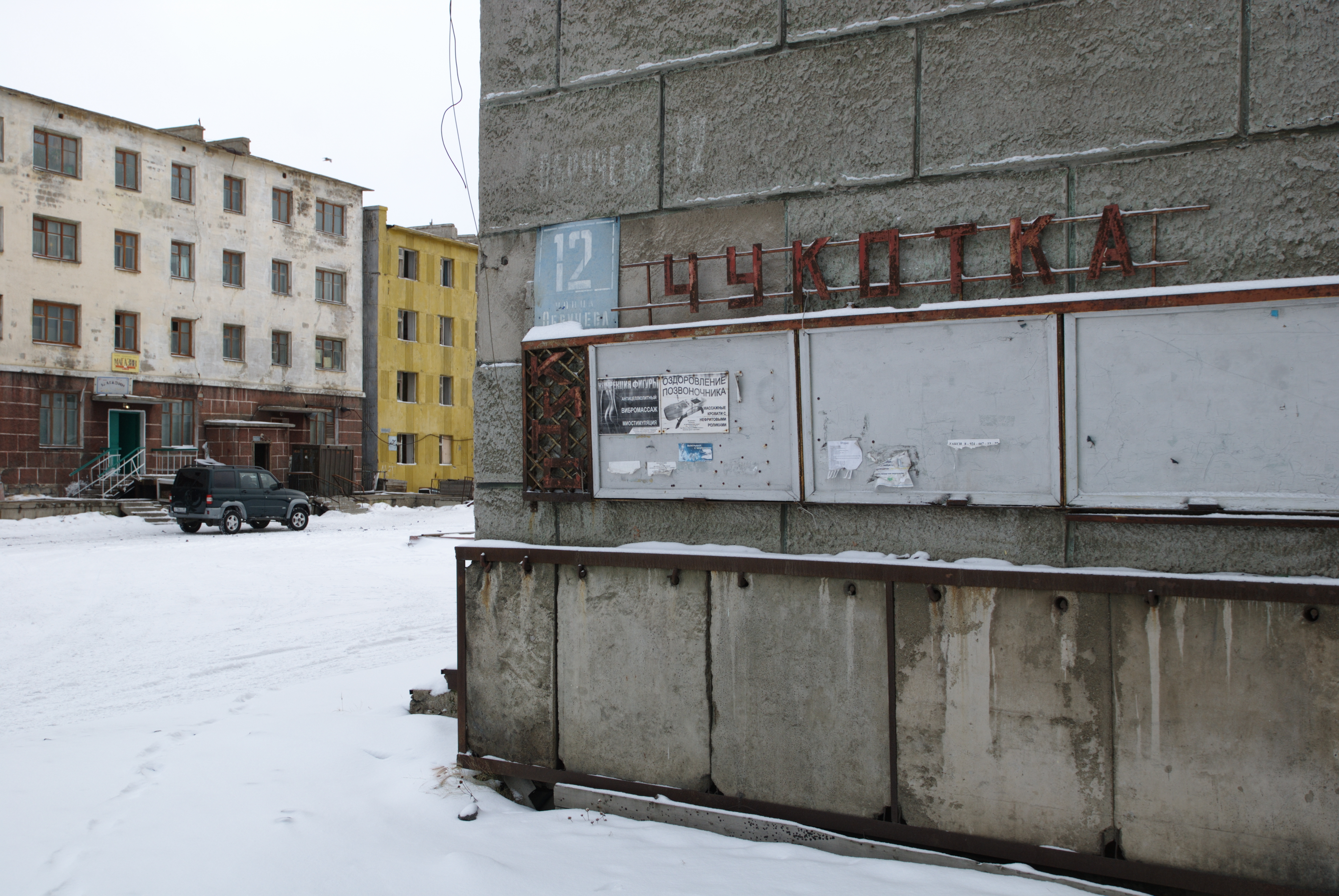
Abandoned buildings in Pevek

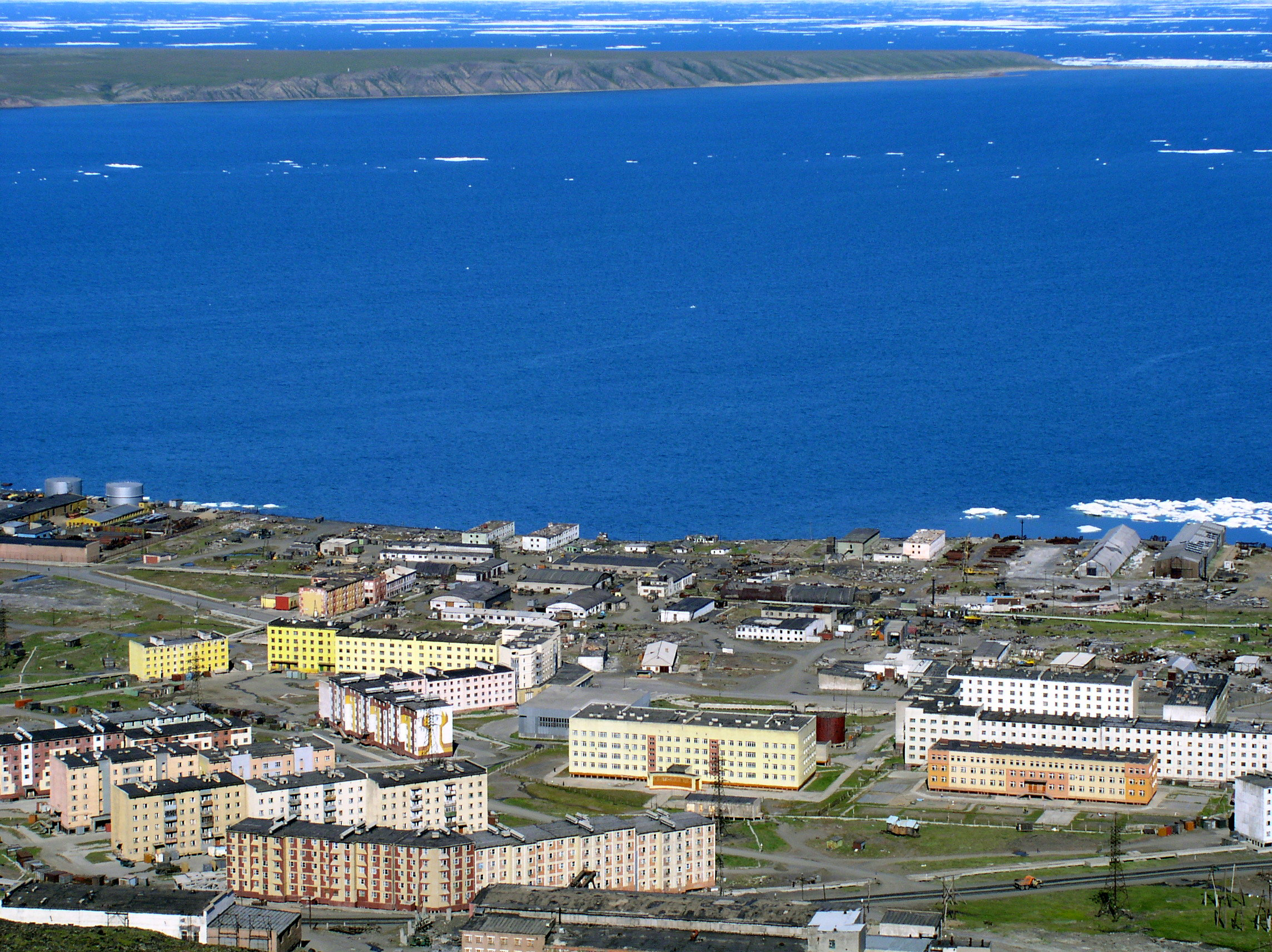
Pevek

== See also ==
- List of inhabited localities in Chaunsky District
- Extreme points of Russia
- Chief Directorate of the Northern Sea Route
