= Ugolny Airport =

Airport in Anadyr, Russia

Ugolny Airport Угольный Рэңанаңытван

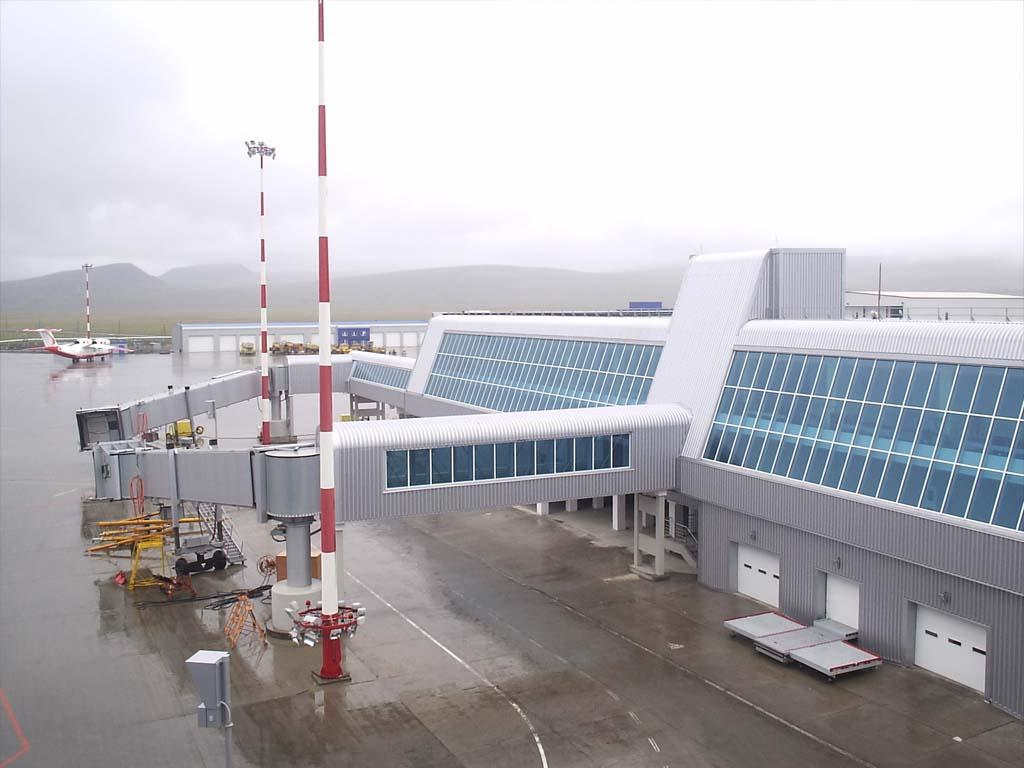
- IATA: DYR; ICAO: UHMA; LID: АНЫ

Summary
- Airport type: Public / military
- Operator: Federal State Unitary Enterprise "Chukotavia"
- Serves: Anadyr
- Location: Anadyr, Russia
- Hub for: Chukotavia
- Elevation AMSL: 194 ft (59 m)
- Coordinates: 64°44′6″N 177°44′30″E
- Website: https://apchukotki.ru/

Map
- Location of airport in Chukotka Autonomous Okrug

Runways
Direction	Length		Surface
Direction	m	ft	Surface
01/19	3,500	11,483	Concrete

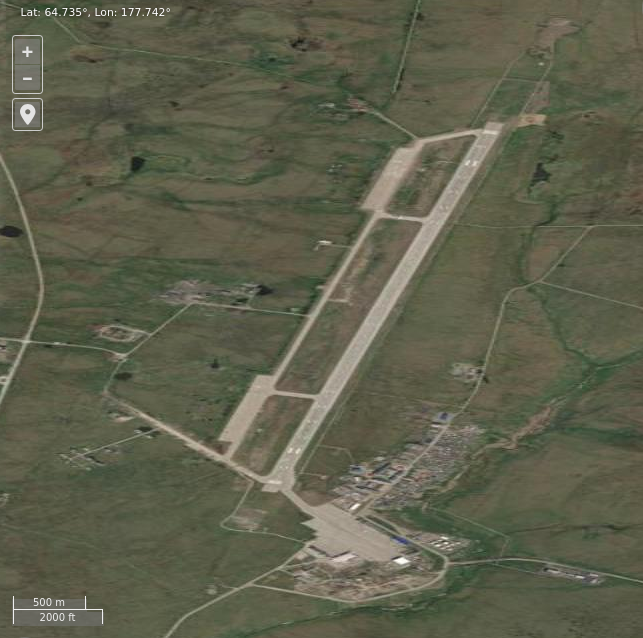
NASA FIRMS imagery of Ugolny Airport

Ugolny Airport (Chukot: Угольный Рэңанаңытван, Russian: Аэропорт Угольный) (also Leninka, Ugolnyye Kopi, Ugolnoye) (IATA: DYR, ICAO: UHMA) is a mixed-use military and civil airfield in the Russian Far East located 11 km east of Anadyr, separated from the town by the waters of Anadyrsky Liman. The airfield was originally constructed in the 1950s as a staging base for Long Range Aviation bombers such as the Tupolev Tu-95 and Tupolev Tu-22M. During the Cold War years it became the primary hub for civilian flights in the Chukotka region.

In May 2019, the airport was named in honor of the Chukchi writer Yuri Rytkheu.

== Civilian history ==
The Soviet-built Ilyushin Il-62 was a workhorse of the route from Moscow Domodedovo Airport to Anadyr for many decades. There is occasional charter aircraft service from Nome, Alaska, to Anadyr.

Anadyr was featured in the American novel Flight of the Old Dog.

In 2018, 102,806 passengers passed through this airport.

On 3 January 2020, United States pilot Matt Guthmiller posted a video of his experience entering the Chukotka Autonomous region without the correct documentation after landing his plane at DYR.

=== Incidents and accidents ===
- On 2 July 2013, a Korean Air Boeing 777-300 performing a scheduled flight from Chicago to Seoul made an emergency landing at Ugolny after one of its engines failed in flight.
- On the morning of 4 March 2019, an Air China Boeing 777-300ER performing a scheduled flight from Beijing to Los Angeles made an emergency landing at Ugolny due to a fire alarm later confirmed false. All of the 10 evacuation slides deployed.

== Ground transportation ==
The airport is located on the opposite site of the Anadyr River from the city. Transport by summer is by boat, by winter by a road on the ice, and for a period in spring and fall, only by helicopter. The helicopter ticket was (in 2015) 3,680 rubles ($60).

== Airlines and destinations ==
=== Passenger ===
Airlines	Destinations
Aurora	Khabarovsk, Petropavlovsk-Kamchatsky, Vladivostok
Chukotavia	Egvekinot, Keperveyem, Lavrentiya, Markovo, Pevek, Provideniya
Rossiya Airlines	Krasnoyarsk–International, Moscow–Sheremetyevo
Yakutia Airlines	Khabarovsk

== Military ==
Anadyr was one of nine Arctic staging bases (in Russian, "bounce aerodrome") for long range bombers. The Russian Air Force's OGA (Arctic Control Group) is responsible for upkeep of the facilities.

Anadyr has also been a prominent base for Soviet Air Defence Forces due to its close proximity to Alaskan airspace. The 529th Fighter Aviation Regiment PVO, flying the Yakovlev Yak-28P (Firebar) interceptor, was stationed at Anadyr starting in the 1960s, along with S-75 (SA-2) surface-to-air missile installations of the 762nd Anti-Aircraft Missile Regiment. The PVO units were under the control of the 25th Air Defense Division of the 11th Separate Air Defense Army, responsible for air defense on the Chukotka Peninsula. An R-14 Chusovaya (SS-5 Skean) medium-range ballistic missile (MRBM) complex of the 83rd Separate Missile Regiment of the Strategic Missile Forces, which targeted American military installations in Alaska, was located 13 km (8 miles) northeast of Ugolny airfield from 1962 to 1969.

In September 1982, the Yak-28s were replaced with 20 Sukhoi Su-15TM (Flagon) as part of a force upgrade. The Su-15 were flown by the 171st Fighter Aviation Regiment which was transferred from Bombora airfield, Gudauta, in the Abkhazian ASSR of the Georgian SSR, while the 529th transferred to Gudauta. The interceptor regiment was disbanded in 1993.

Fighter aircraft are no longer based permanently at Anadyr, and the region was overflown daily by foreign aircraft on the Asian polar route before the 2022 Russian invasion of Ukraine. Temporary military deployments are common, however. In 2001, the airfield was visited by Tupolev Tu-95MS and Ilyushin Il-78 aircraft on exercise from Engels air base.

In 2014, Russia announced plans to deploy MiG-31 interceptors at the airport.

As of 2025, Russia occasionally uses the airport as a forward basing point for the Tu-160.

== See also ==
- List of airports in Russia
- List of military airbases in Russia
