= Routan Islands =

Islands in Russia

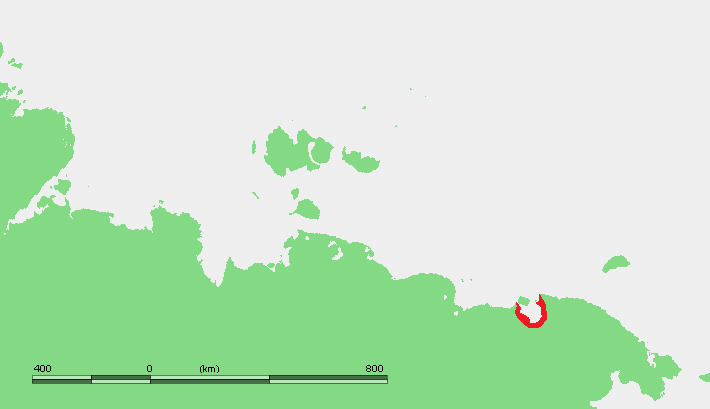
Location of the Chaunskaya Bay.

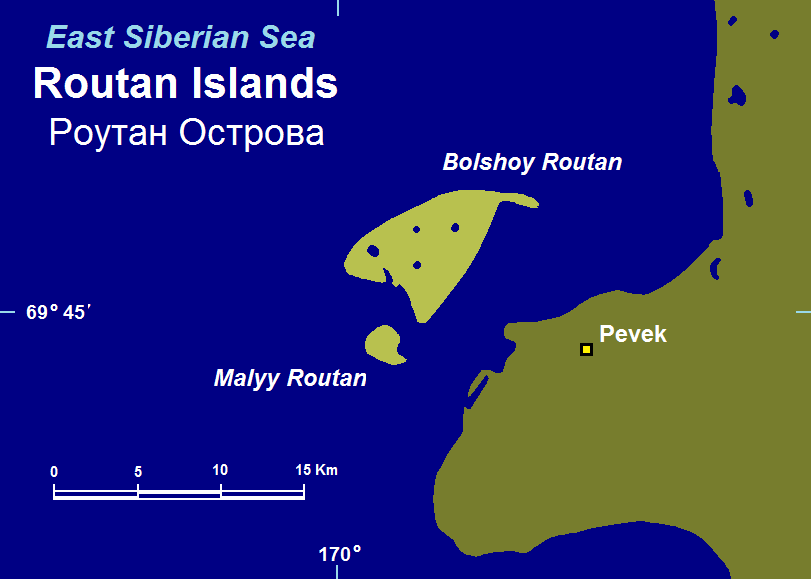

The Routan Islands (Chukot: Ровтын иӆирти Rovtįn iłirti) are two islands in the eastern coast of the Chaunskaya Bay of the East Siberian Sea. They are located directly off Pevek, separated from the shore of the Pevek Peninsula by a 4.7 km wide sound. Ayon Island lies on the other side of the Chaunskaya Bay, 24 km to the west.

- Bolshoy Routan Island (Russian: Остров Большой Роутан) 69.752°N 170.136°E is roughly triangular. It is 9.5 km long and 4.5 km wide. A small Arctic Station is located on the island.
- Malyy Routan Island (Russian: Остров Ма́лый Роутан) 69.693°N 170.068°E is much smaller and lies 1 km to the west of Bolshoy Routan's southern point. It is only 1.3 km in length.

Administratively these islands belong to the Chukotka Autonomous Okrug of the Russian Federation.

== See also ==
- List of islands of Russia
