= Kyrganay Range =

Mountain range in Russia

- хребет Кырганай
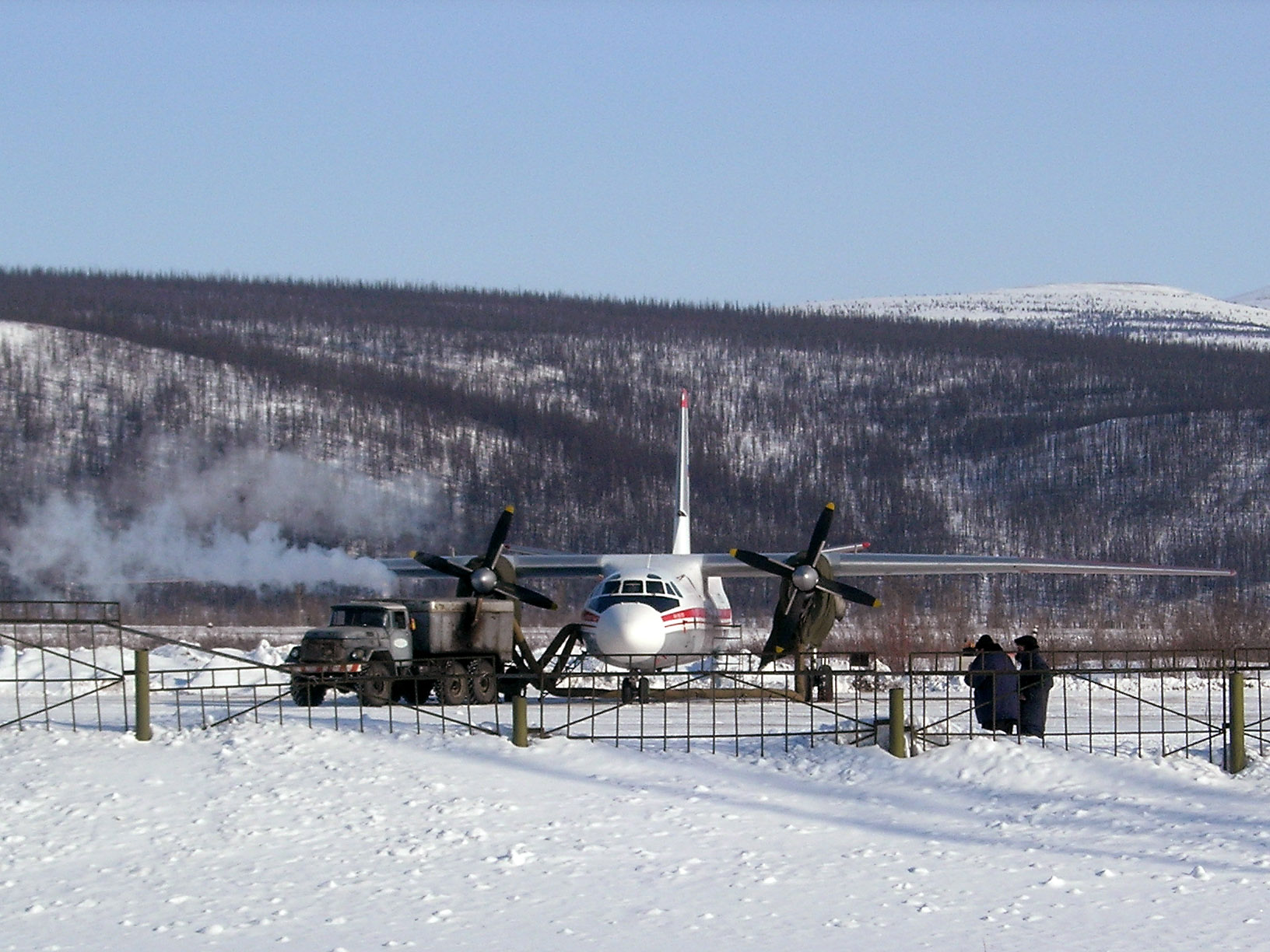
- View of the range by Keperveyem Airport

Highest point
- Peak: Unnamed
- Elevation: 1,415 m (4,642 ft)
- Coordinates: 67°55′N 167°0′E

Dimensions
- Length: 40 km (25 mi) WNW/ESE
- Width: 12 km (7.5 mi) NNE/WSW

Geography
- Location within Chukotka Autonomous Okrug
- Location: Chukotka Autonomous Okrug, Russian Far East
- Parent range: East Siberian System

Geology
- Orogeny: Alpine orogeny
- Rock age: Triassic
- Rock type(s): Sandstone, shale and igneous rock intrusions

Climbing
- Easiest route: from Keperveyem or Bilibino

The Kyrganay Range (Russian: хребет Кырганай or хребет Кыргонай) is a range of mountains in Chukotka Autonomous Okrug, Russian Far East. Administratively the range is part of Bilibino District.

The village of Keperveyem is located at the feet of the range in its western end. Bilibino is located about 25 kilometres (16 mi) further to the north.

== Geography ==
The Kyrganay Range rises above the northern bank of the Maly Anyuy River. To the east the mountain range is limited by the Egilknyveyem River and to the west by the valley of the Maly Keperveyem River, both right hand tributaries of the Maly Anyuy River. To the south, on the other side of the Maly Anyuy, rises the Chuvanay Range. The ghost town of Aliskerovo, beyond which rises the Ilirney Range, lies at the eastern end of the Kyrganay Mountains.

The highest point of the Kyrganay Range is an unnamed 1,415 metres (4,642 ft) high summit. The Kyrganay Range is part of the East Siberian System of mountains and is one of the subranges of the Anadyr Highlands. The mountains are characterized by a smooth relief, like most of the neighboring mountain ranges of Bilibino District, such as the Rauchuan Range further to the north. The southern sides of the slopes of the range are covered with sparse taiga.

== See also ==
- List of mountains and hills of Russia
- List of inhabited localities in Bilibinsky District
