= Chuvanay Range =

Mountain Range in Okrug, Far East Russia

- Чуванайские Горы
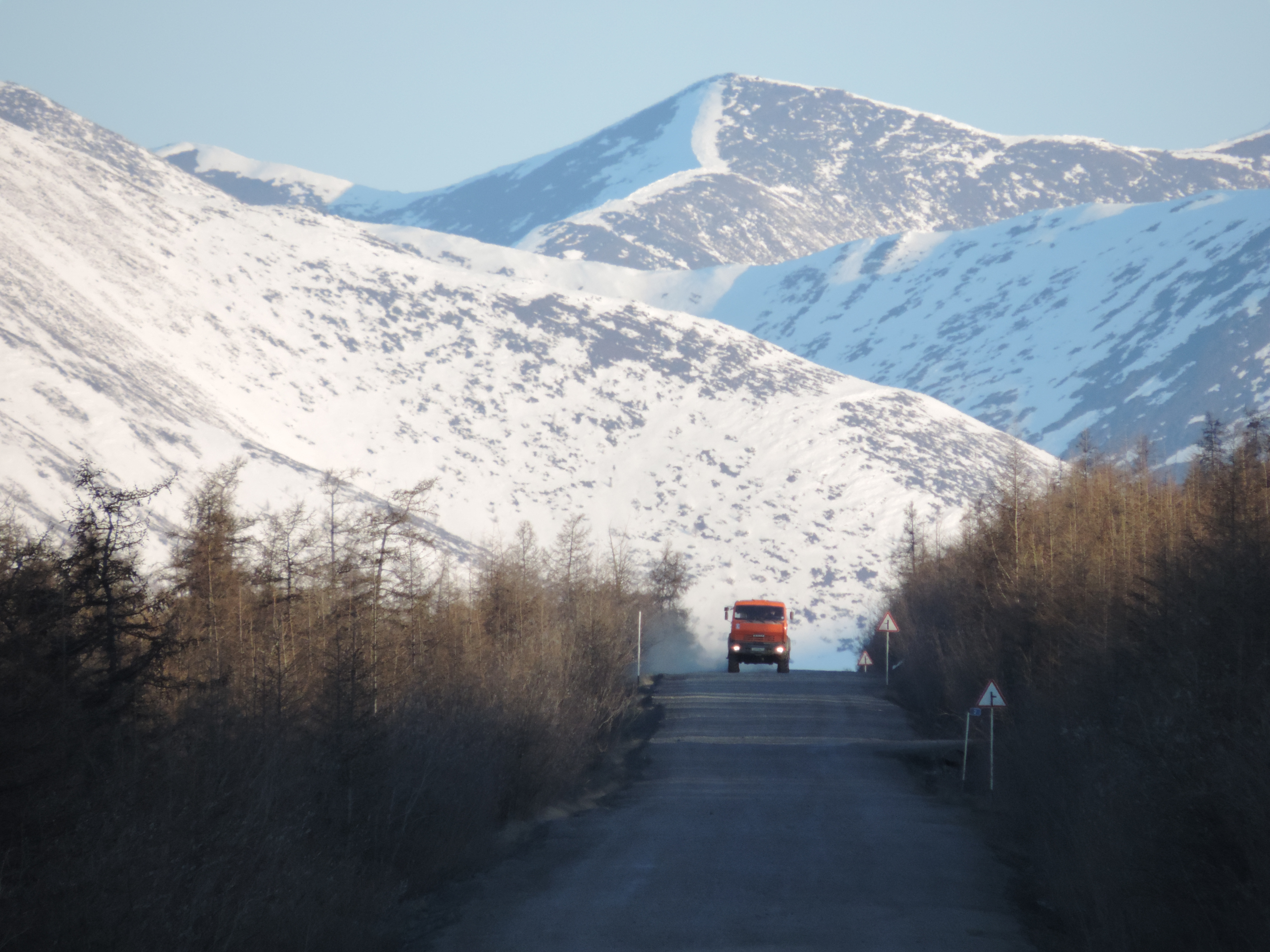
- View of the range

Highest point
- Peak: Mount Chuvanay
- Elevation: 1,614 m (5,295 ft)
- Coordinates: 67°40′N 167°0′E

Dimensions
- Length: 60 km (37 mi) NW/SE
- Width: 20 km (12 mi) NE/SW

Geography
- Location within Chukotka Autonomous Okrug
- Location: Chukotka Autonomous Okrug, Russian Far East
- Parent range: Anadyr Highlands of East Siberian System

Geology
- Orogeny: Alpine orogeny
- Rock age: Triassic
- Rock type(s): Sandstone, shale and igneous rock intrusions

Climbing
- Easiest route: from Keperveyem or Bilibino

The Chuvanay Range (Russian: Чуванайские Горы), also known as Chuvan Mountains (Чуванский хребет), is a range of mountains in Chukotka Autonomous Okrug, Russian Far East. Administratively the range is part of Bilibino District.

The village of Keperveyem is located at the feet of the range in its northwestern end, on the other side of the Maly Anyuy River. Bilibino is located about 40 kilometres (25 mi) further to the north.

== Geography ==
The highest point of the Chuvanay Range is 1,614 metres (5,295 ft) high mount Chuvanay (гора Чуванаи). To the east and northeast the mountain range is limited by the course of the Maly Anyuy River, which makes a wide bend, flowing first northwards and then again westwards. To the south the range is bound by the Kulpolney River and to the west by the valley of the Tenvelveyem —left hand tributaries of the Maly Anyuy. A few other tributaries of the Maly Anyuy have their source in the range, flowing between both and joining the left bank of the river. The ghost town of Aliskerovo, beyond which rises the Ilirney Range, lies to the northeast, on the other side of the river, near its confluence with the Egilknyveyem River (Эгилькнывеем).

To the south and southwest rises the Anyuy Range and to the north the smaller Kyrganay Range. The Chuvanay Range is part of the East Siberian System of mountains and is one of the subranges of the Anadyr Highlands.

The general profile of the mountains is more pointed than the neighboring mountain ranges of Bilibino District, such as the Kyrganay, or the Rauchuan Range further to the north, which are characterized by a smoother relief.

== See also ==
- List of inhabited localities in Bilibinsky District
- Chuvans
