= Maly Anyuy =

Maly Anyuy Малый Анюй
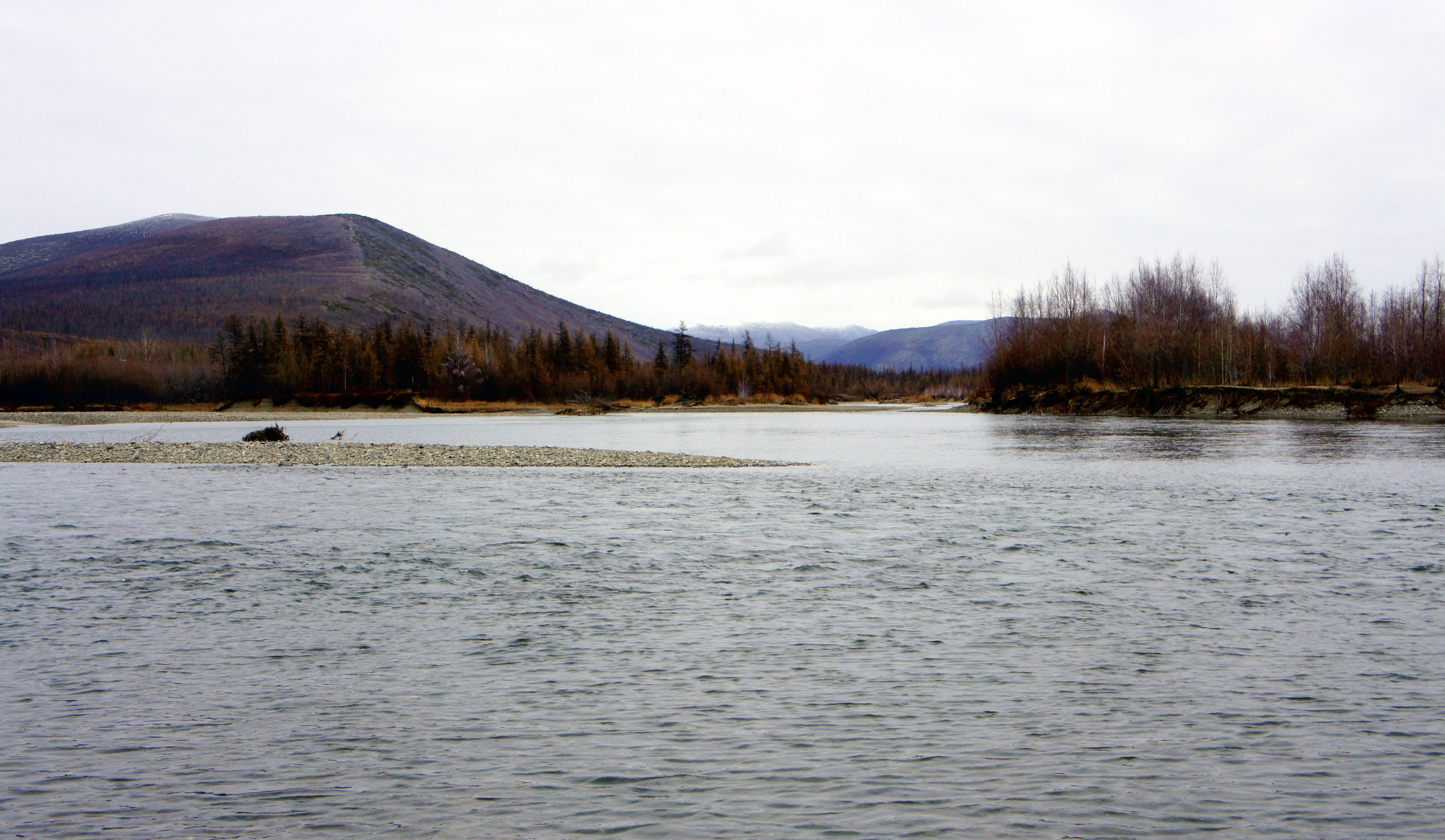
- The Maly Anyuy flowing in the Bilibinsky District area

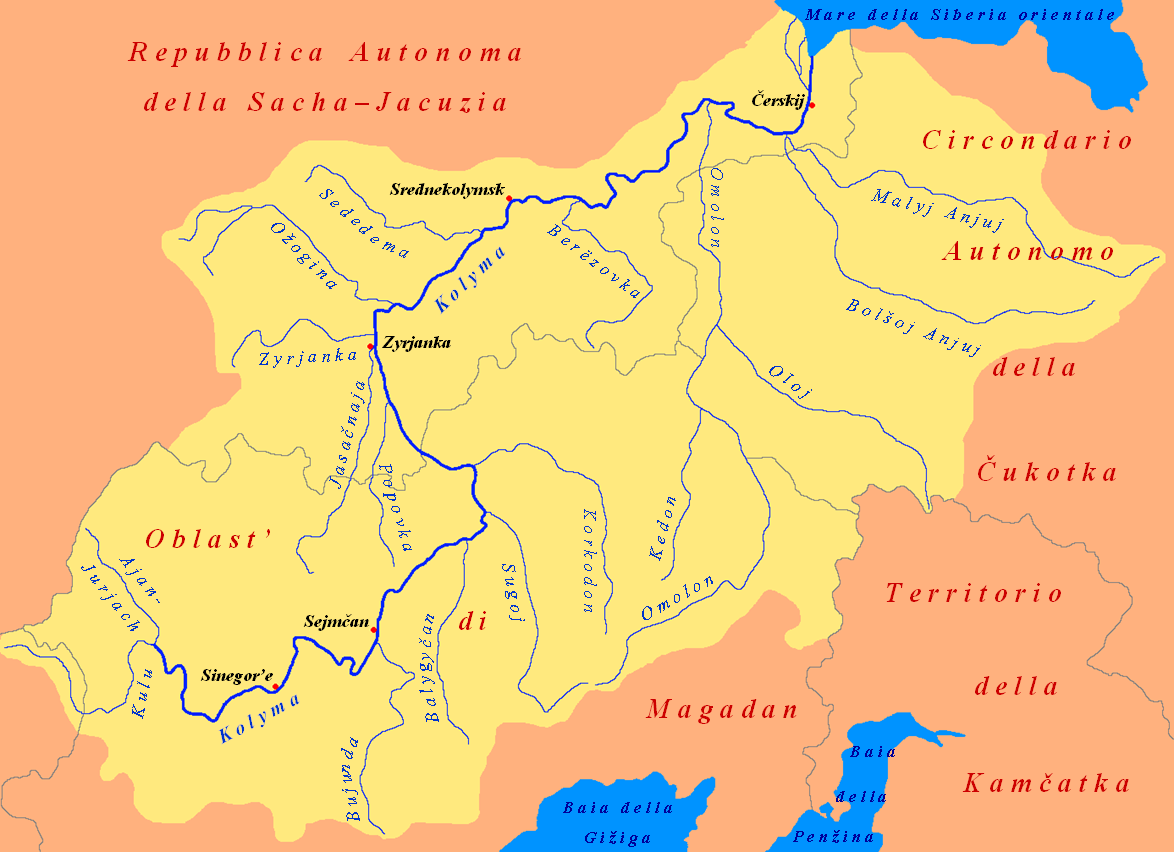
- The watershed of the Maly Anyuy within the Kolyma basin.

- Location in the Chukotka Autonomous Okrug, Russia

Location
- Country: Russia

Physical characteristics
- Source: Anadyr Plateau
  - location: Chukotka Autonomous Okrug
  - coordinates: 67°10′42″N 170°46′39″E
  - elevation: 588 m (1,929 ft)
- Mouth: Anyuy
  - location: Sakha Republic
  - coordinates: 68°27′43″N 160°48′10″E
  - elevation: 0.2 m (7.9 in)
- Length: 738 km (459 mi)
- Basin size: 49,800 square kilometres (19,200 mi^{2})
- Discharge
  - average: 181 m^{3}/s (6,400 cu ft/s)

Basin features
- Progression: Anyuy→ Kolyma→ East Siberian Sea

The Maly Anyuy (Russian: Ма́лый Аню́й; maly meaning "little") is a river in the Kolyma basin in the Russian Far East. Most of the basin of the Maly Anyuy and its tributaries belongs to the Chukotka Autonomous Okrug administrative region of Russia.

== Geography ==
The Maly Anyuy flows roughly westwards, south and west of the Ilirney Range, making a wide bend by the Chuvanay Range —flowing first northwards and then westwards again at the feet of the Kyrganay Range— in western Chukotka Autonomous Okrug. Just after crossing into the Sakha Republic, it meets the Bolshoy Anyuy, merging with it into a single channel (Anyuy proper) 8 kilometres (5.0 mi) before meeting the Kolyma close to its delta. Its length is 738 kilometres (459 mi) and its basin surface 49,800 square kilometres (19,200 mi^{2}).

The El'gygytgyn Meteorite Crater is about 50 kilometres (31 mi) from its source.

The most important inhabited localities in the Maly Anyuy valley are Aliskerovo and Bilibino, on the shores of smaller tributaries.

== Fauna ==
Among the fish found in the Maly Anyuy are different species of trout, salmon and golets (голец), as well as the peled.
