= Keperveyem Airport =

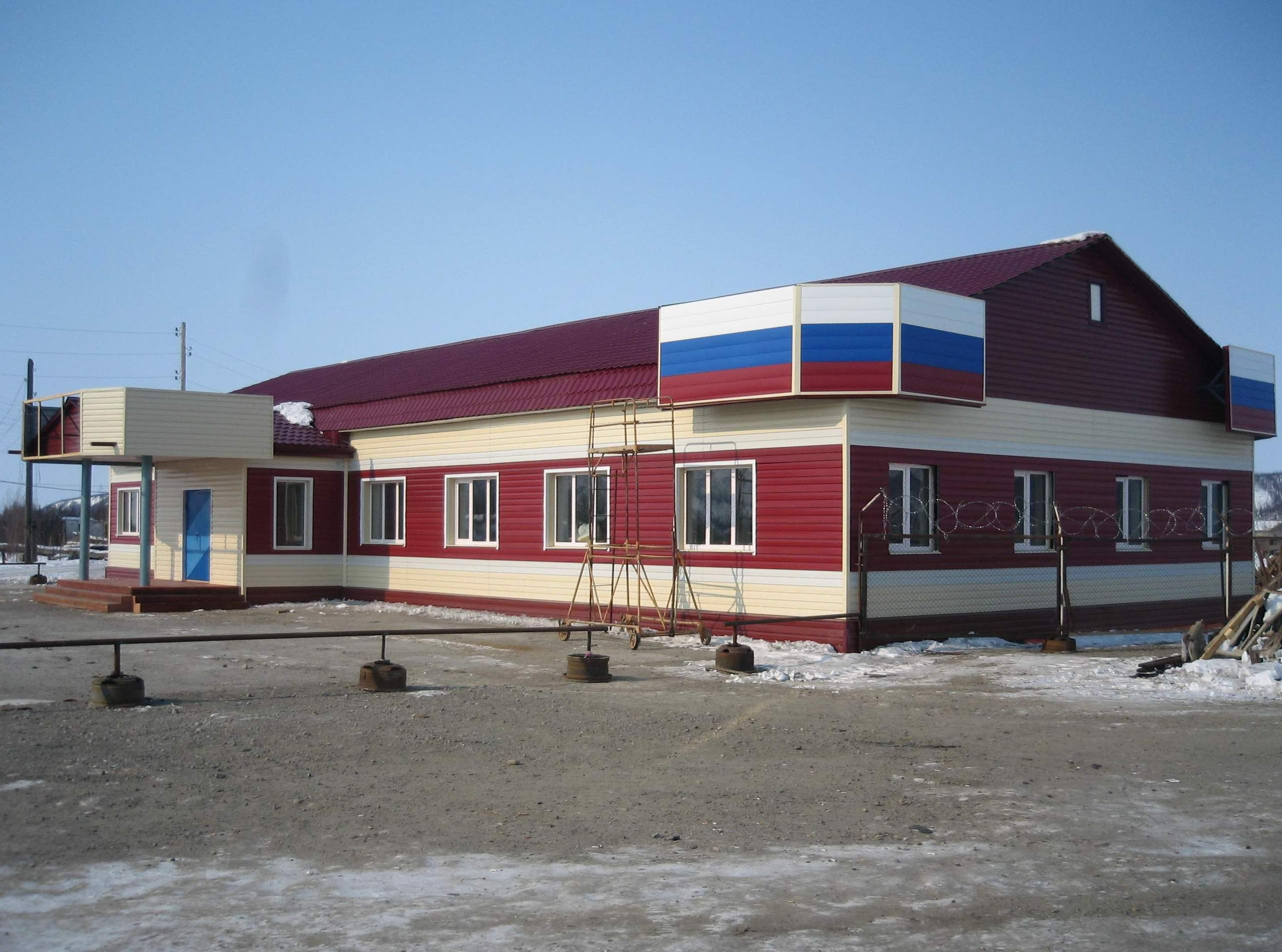
- Keperveyem Airport terminal
- IATA: KPW; ICAO: UHMK; LID: КПМ

Summary
- Airport type: Public
- Serves: Keperveyem, Chukotka Autonomous Okrug, Russia
- Coordinates: 67°50′49″N 166°08′20″E

Maps
- Chukotka Autonomous Okrug in Russia

- Location of the airport in the Chukotka district

Runways
Direction	Length		Surface
Direction	m	ft	Surface
09/27	2,475	8,120	gravel
- Sources: GCM, STV

Keperveyem Airport (Russian: Аэропорт Кепервеем) (IATA: KPW, ICAO: UHMK) is an airport located in Keperveyem, in the Chukotka autonomous district of Russia. It also serves Bilibino, with which it is connected with a 40 kilometres (25 mi) long gravel road.

== Airlines and destinations ==
Airlines	Destinations
Chukotavia	Anadyr, Pevek
IrAero	Magadan

== See also ==
- Kyrganay Range
- List of airports in Russia
