= Keperveyem =

Keperveyem Кепервеем Ӄэпэрвээм (Chukchi)
- Selo
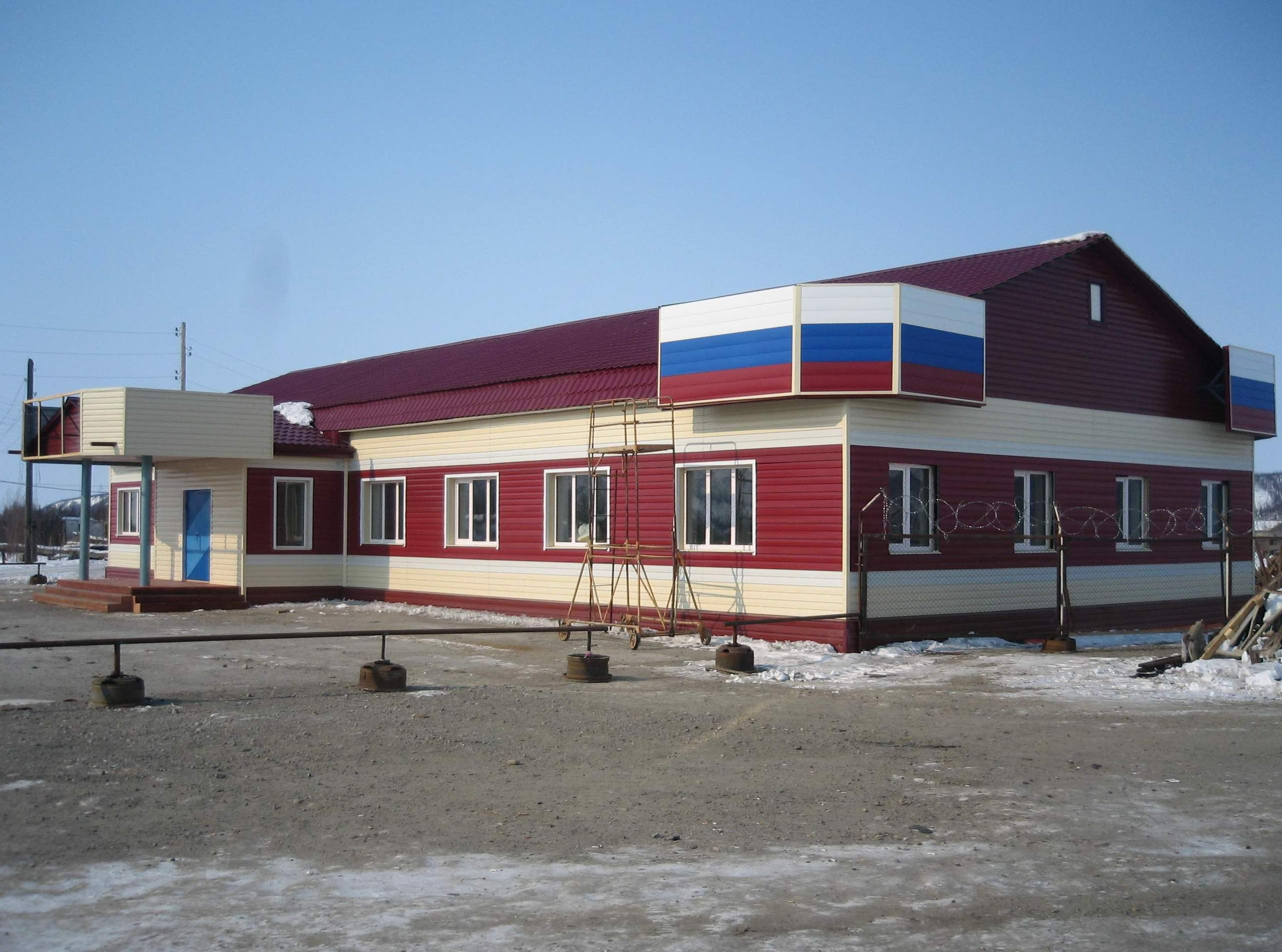
- Keperveyem Airport terminal
- Interactive map of Keperveyem
- Location of Keperveyem Keperveyem (Chukotka Autonomous Okrug)
- Coordinates: 67°49′N 166°06′E
- Country: Russia
- Federal subject: Chukotka Autonomous Okrug
- Administrative district: Bilibinsky District
- Founded: 1934

Area
  - Total: 13.84 km^{2} (5.34 sq mi)

Population (2010 Census)
  - Total: 336
  - Estimate (January 2018): 268 (−20.2%)
  - Density: 24.3/km^{2} (62.9/sq mi)

Municipal status
  - Municipal district: Bilibinsky Municipal District
  - Urban settlement: Bilibino Urban Settlement
- Time zone: UTC+12 (MSK+9)
- Postal code: 689480
- Dialing code: +7 42738
- OKTMO ID: 77609101106

Keperveyem (Russian: Кепервеем; Chukchi: Ӄэпэрвээм, Ḳèpèrvèèm) is a rural locality (a selo) in Bilibinsky District of Chukotka Autonomous Okrug, Russia. Municipally, Keperveyem is subordinated to Bilibinsky Municipal District and is incorporated within Bilibino Urban Settlement. Population: 336 (2010 census);

The name Keperveyem comes from the Chukchi for Wolverine River.

== Geography ==
Keperveyem is located just southwest of Bilibino on the banks of the Bolshoy Keperveyem River, near its confluence with the Maly Anyuy River. The Kyrganay Range rises to the east and the Chuvanay Range to the southeast of the town. Aliskerovo is located to the east, at the eastern end of the Kyrganay Range.

== History ==
The village was founded in 1934 following the collectivisation of a number of nomadic herders into a collective farm called Vperyod (Russian: Вперёд), which was initially located further north on the Rauchua River near its mouth on the shore of the East Siberian Sea. In 1947, the collective farm was moved to the present site of the village on the banks of the River Keperveyem. A new airfield was developed in the winter of 1963, which would go on to become the gateway to Bilibinsky District.

=== Change in municipal status ===
On November 20, 2010, a law was passed abolishing Keperveyem Rural Settlement. Keperveyem still exists as a selo, but is now municipally incorporated into Bilibino Urban Settlement. The local municipal administration of Keperveyem was abolished, and governmental power, along with municipal property, property rights and budgets were transferred to Bilibino municipal administration.

== Demographics ==
The population as at January 2010 was 336, of whom 166 were male and 170 female, a slight variation on a 2010 estimate of 328 on the Bilibinsky District Official website, and down from an estimated population of 461 in 2005 in a report on the Kupol gold project. The head of the village is Sergei Mikhalin. The village was demographically organised thus:

Demographic Composition – 2010
| Indigenous People | Number in Village | Percentage of Population |
|---|---|---|
| Chukchi | 137 | 42% |
| Russian, Ukrainian and Others | 127 | 39% |
| Even | 61 | 19% |
| Koryak | 3 | 1% |
| Lamut | 3 | 1% |
| Itelmen | 2 | 1% |
| Total | 328 | 100% |

== Economy and Culture ==
Inhabitants are reindeer herding, fishing, hunting, seasonal picking berries and mushrooms, as well as maintenance of the airfield infrastructure. The village is also the base of the municipal agricultural enterprise "Keperveem."

The village has a Children's Art School, post office, recreation center, library, shop and operates a boarding school. In 1998, the school was reorganized into a single complex kindergarten-school through the merger of middle school and kindergarten "Brusnichka" and this is where a number of children from remote villages and camps live and study during the academic year. The school operates an art studio "Northern Lights", the national dance studio "Nutengrep" publishes the newspaper "Chic" and has created its own museum. School is the winner of the All-Russia competition of educational institutions, introducing innovative educational programs, in 2007 it was awarded a grant in the amount of 1 million rubles.

A Young Reindeer Festival is held here every August on Native Peoples' Day. There is a folklore ensemble in the village called Nutengrep (Russian: Нутэнгрэп).

== Transport ==
The village is 36 km from the district centre Bilibino and approximately 626 km from the okrug centre Anadyr. It is the site of Keperveyem Airport, which serves Bilibino, around which the village is situated. There is also a road linking Keperveyem and the airport with Bilibino and onward to Vesenny There is also a small network of roads within the settlement including:

- Улица Береговая (Ulitsa Beregovaya, lit. Coastal Street)
- Улица Билибина (Ulitsa Bilibina, lit. Bilibin Street)
- Улица Гагарина (Ulitsa Gagarina, lit. Gagarin Street)
- Улица Кавракая (Ulitsa Kavrakaya)
- Улица Комарова (Ulitsa Komarova)
- Улица Лесная (Ulitsa Lechnaya, lit. Forest Street)
- Улица Портовая (Ulitsa Portovaya, lit. Port Street)
- Улица Центральная (Ulitsa Tsentralnaya, lit. Central Street)

== See also ==
- List of inhabited localities in Bilibinsky District
