= Bilibino =

Bilibino Билибино
- Town
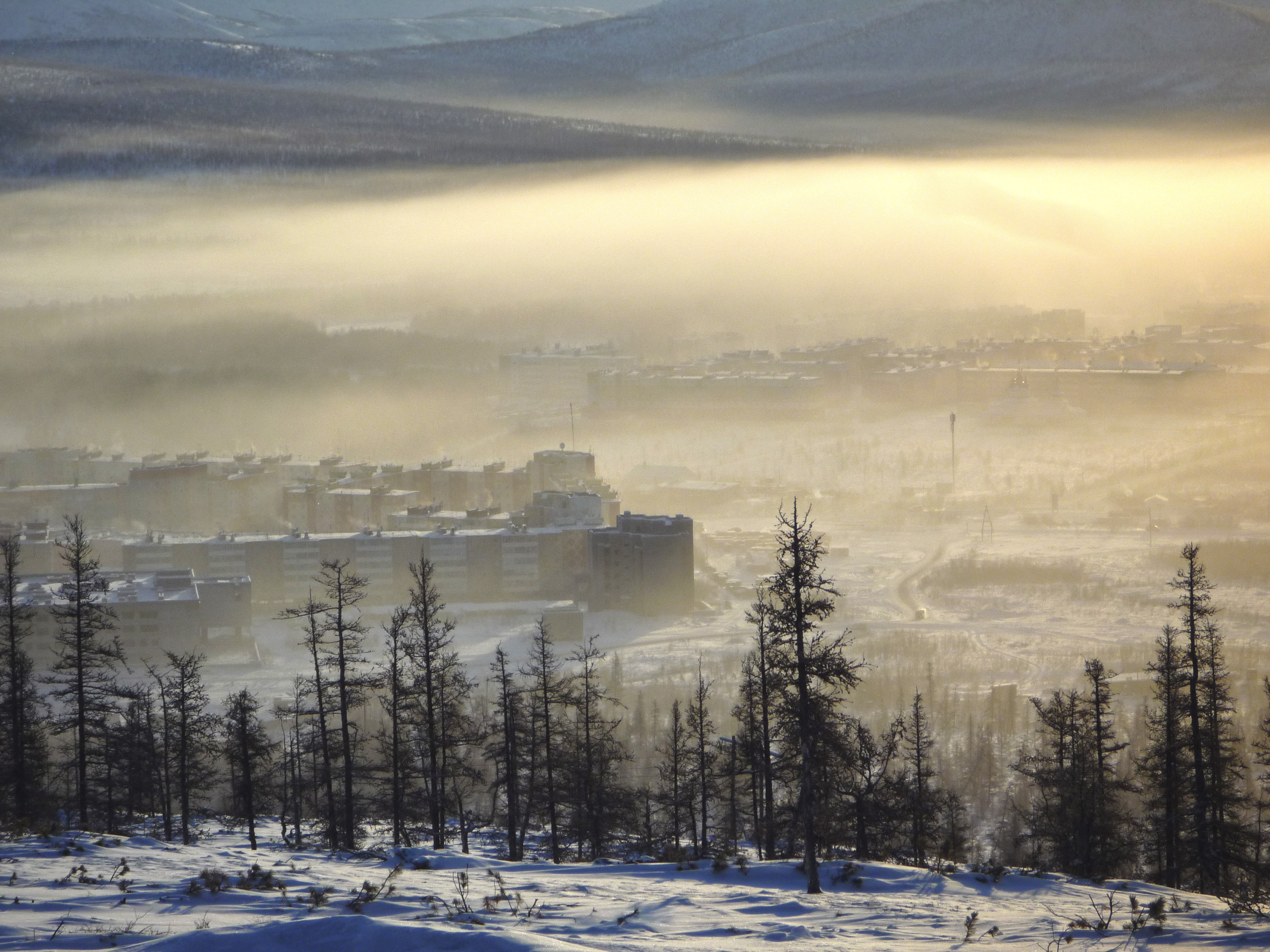
- Winter fog over Bilibino

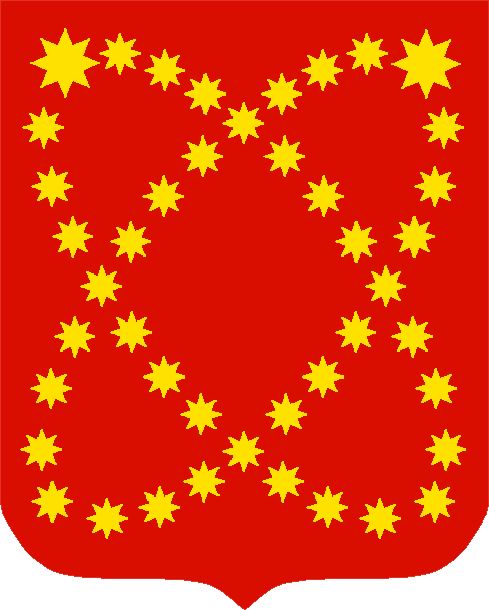
- Coat of arms
- Interactive map of Bilibino
- Location of Bilibino Bilibino (Chukotka Autonomous Okrug)
- Coordinates: 68°03′N 166°27′E
- Country: Russia
- Federal subject: Chukotka Autonomous Okrug
- Administrative district: Bilibinsky District
- Founded: March 1955
- Town status since: June 28, 1993

Government
  - Head: Svetlana Tolstaya

Area
  - Total: 22.15 km^{2} (8.55 sq mi)
- Elevation: 274 m (899 ft)

Population (2010 Census)
  - Total: 5,506
  - Estimate (January 2016): 5,453 (−1%)
  - Density: 248.6/km^{2} (643.8/sq mi)

Administrative status
  - Capital of: Bilibinsky District

Municipal status
  - Municipal district: Bilibinsky Municipal District
  - Urban settlement: Bilibino Urban Settlement
  - Capital of: Bilibinsky Municipal District, Bilibino Urban Settlement
- Time zone: UTC+12 (MSK+9)
- Postal code: 689450
- Dialing code: +7 42738
- OKTMO ID: 77609101001

Bilibino (Russian: Били́бино) is a town and the administrative center of Bilibinsky District in Chukotka Autonomous Okrug, Russia. It is located 625 kilometers (388 mi) northwest of Anadyr, the administrative center of the autonomous okrug. It is the second largest town in the autonomous okrug after Anadyr. Population: 5,546 (2021 census); 5,506 (2010 census); 6,181 (2002 census); 15,558 (1989 Soviet census).

== Geography ==
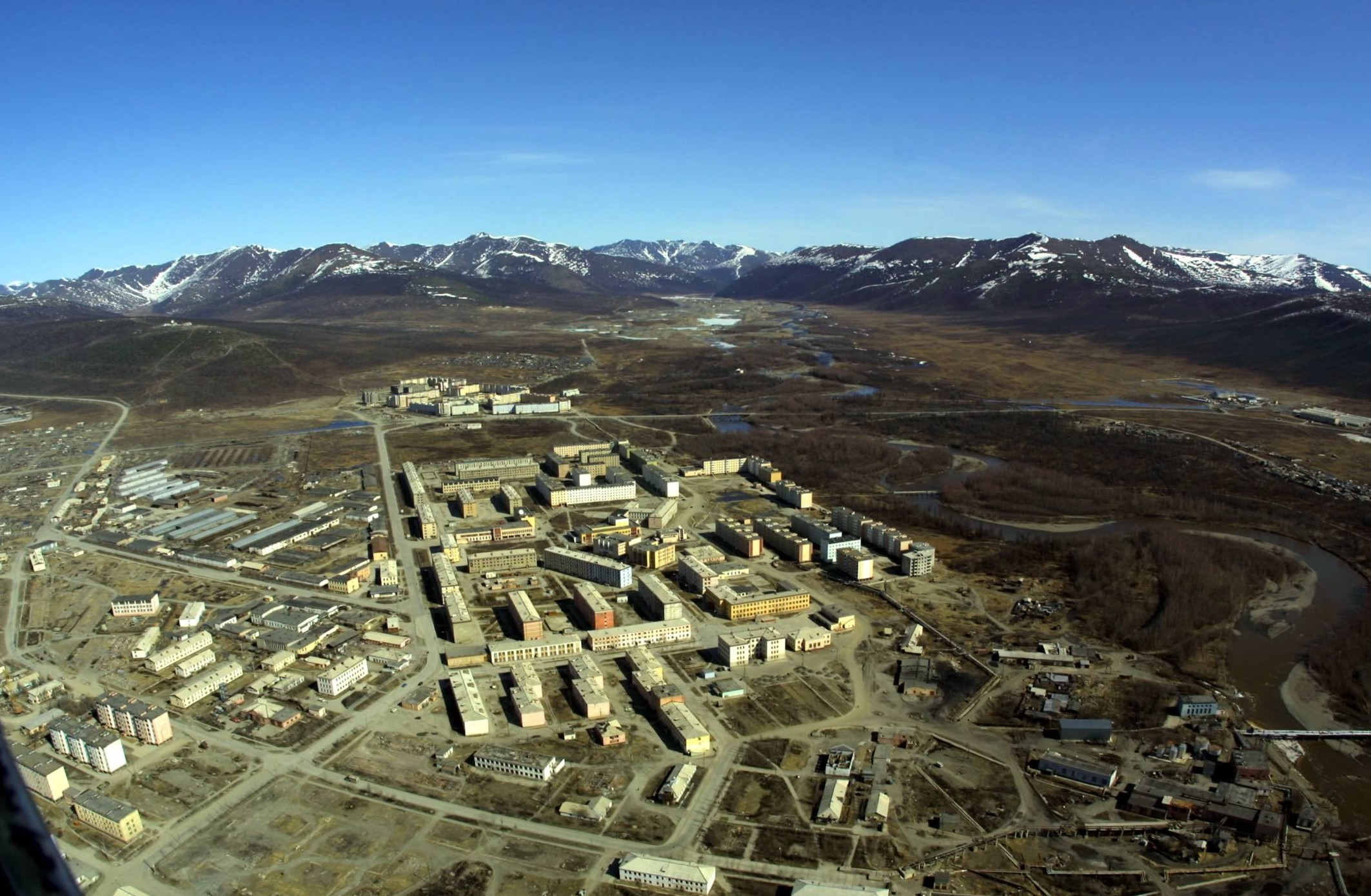
Aerial view of Bilibino

The town of Bilibino was built at the confluence of the Karalveyem and Bolshoy Keperveyem Rivers (Kolyma's basin).

Bilibino is on the transition zone between the conifer forest and the tundra of the East Siberian Mountains, southeast of the Pyrkanay Range (Горы Пырканай), southwest of the Rauchuan Range (Раучуанский хребет) and north of the Kyrganay Range and the Chuvan Mountains.

== History ==
As with much of the rest of Chukotka, the earliest human remains found in the region around Bilibino have been dated to the Early Neolithic, with camp sites having been excavated at Orlovka 2, a site on the banks of the Orlovka River, as well as at Lakes Tytyl and Ilirney.

Interest in the area around the present day site of the town began in the 1920s when prospectors including Soviet geologist Yuri Bilibin (1901–1952) discovered gold in the region and began to make assessments regarding the commercial viability of its extraction. In March 1955, gold mining operations commenced and the construction of a settlement started, though at this stage it was little more than a collection of geologists' and prospectors' tents, who had originally been based in Seymchan. Because of his discovery of gold in the region, particularly within the vicinity of the Bolshoy Anyuy and Maly Anyuy Rivers, the geologists named the new settlement after Yury Bilibin, and the new name was officially adopted in February 1956. On September 6, 1958, Bilibino was granted urban-type settlement status.

Bilibino's development intensified in the early 1960s when it was joined to the Pevek power grid. On August 2, 1961, Bilibino became the administrative center of the Eastern Tundra District (Rayon Vostochnoy Tundry) which was renamed Bilibino District (Bilibinsky Rayon) on the occasion. In 1965, the Soviet government decided to build the Bilibino Nuclear Power Plant. The construction aided by several hundred volunteers from the Komsomol organization was completed in 1974; by 1976 three additional reactors were put into operation. Town status was granted to Bilibino on June 28, 1993.

== Administrative and municipal status ==
Within the framework of administrative divisions, Bilibino serves as the administrative center of Bilibinsky District, to which it is directly subordinated. As a municipal division, the town of Bilibino is, together with the selo of Keperveyem, incorporated within Bilibinsky Municipal District as Bilibino Urban Settlement.

== Economy ==
The town was home to the world's northernmost nuclear power plant, the Bilibino Nuclear Power Plant, which opened in January 1974. It was the only nuclear power plant in the Russian Far East had four reactors, each with an output of 12 MWe. The plant began the process of decommissioning 7 years before its eventual close in 2025, with the first reactor shut down in 2018. The plant then progressively shut down, with it finally closing in December 2025 after Unit 3 and Unit 4 were taken offline that month. The beginning of full site rehabilitation is expected to occur from around 2054. It was replaced by the Akademik Lomonosov floating nuclear power plant which has a capacity of 70MW and will be providing electricity and heat to the region.

The nearest operating gold mine is located 20 kilometers (12 mi) west of the town.

=== Transportation ===
The region where Bilibino is located has virtually no roads that are usable year-round; even a trip from the Keperveyem Airport to Bilibino town requires a 33-kilometer (21 mi) journey along an unpaved road. There is also an unpaved road to the seaport of Zelyony Mys on the Kolyma River near Chersky in the Sakha Republic (around 250 km). Heavier transports use this road. There is a winter-only ice road between Pevek and Bilibino.

== Demographics ==
In a typical development for the post-Soviet era in the Russian Far East, Bilibino's population dropped significantly after the dissolution of the Soviet Union. During the 1989 Soviet Census, the population of Bilibino was 15,558; it fell to 6,181 in the 2002 Census and further down to 5,506 in the 2010 Russian Census. As of January 2010, the ethnic make up of the town was mostly Russians (71%) and Ukrainians (15%); Chukchi people and Evens accounted for 6% and 3%, correspondingly; with all other ethnicities accounting for less than 1% each.

== Climate ==
Bilibino has a subarctic climate (Dfc) according to the Köppen climate classification. Summers are short and cool with chilly nights, while winters are long, dry and bitterly cold.

Climate data for Bilibino
Month	Jan	Feb	Mar	Apr	May	Jun	Jul	Aug	Sep	Oct	Nov	Dec	Year
Record high °C (°F)	3.8 (38.8)	2.4 (36.3)	5.0 (41.0)	8.6 (47.5)	22.2 (72.0)	30.6 (87.1)	33.0 (91.4)	29.8 (85.6)	23.3 (73.9)	11.6 (52.9)	2.0 (35.6)	3.5 (38.3)	33.0 (91.4)
Mean daily maximum °C (°F)	−29.4 (−20.9)	−27.4 (−17.3)	−17.1 (1.2)	−7.6 (18.3)	2.4 (36.3)	12.6 (54.7)	14.7 (58.5)	11.2 (52.2)	3.7 (38.7)	−8.8 (16.2)	−20.3 (−4.5)	−27.1 (−16.8)	−7.8 (18.0)
Daily mean °C (°F)	−32.3 (−26.1)	−30.8 (−23.4)	−21.8 (−7.2)	−12.2 (10.0)	−1.2 (29.8)	8.9 (48.0)	11.1 (52.0)	7.8 (46.0)	0.9 (33.6)	−11.9 (10.6)	−23.3 (−9.9)	−29.9 (−21.8)	−11.2 (11.8)
Mean daily minimum °C (°F)	−35.1 (−31.2)	−33.9 (−29.0)	−26.2 (−15.2)	−17.4 (0.7)	−5.3 (22.5)	4.9 (40.8)	7.4 (45.3)	4.4 (39.9)	−1.7 (28.9)	−14.7 (5.5)	−26.2 (−15.2)	−32.6 (−26.7)	−14.7 (5.5)
Record low °C (°F)	−49.7 (−57.5)	−52.2 (−62.0)	−50.4 (−58.7)	−40 (−40)	−23.0 (−9.4)	−7.7 (18.1)	−5.3 (22.5)	−9.6 (14.7)	−15.1 (4.8)	−31.4 (−24.5)	−46.5 (−51.7)	−49.3 (−56.7)	−52.2 (−62.0)
Average precipitation mm (inches)	11 (0.4)	10 (0.4)	12 (0.5)	13 (0.5)	26 (1.0)	52 (2.0)	67 (2.6)	61 (2.4)	41 (1.6)	27 (1.1)	22 (0.9)	14 (0.6)	356 (14)
