= Dalny =

Dalny (Russian: Да́льний; masculine), Dalnyaya (Да́льняя; feminine), or Dalneye (Да́льнее; neuter) is the name of several inhabited localities in Russia.

== Modern localities ==
Urban localities

- Dalny, Chukotka Autonomous Okrug, an urban-type settlement in Bilibinsky District of Chukotka Autonomous Okrug

Rural localities

- Dalny, Rebrikhinsky District, Altai Krai, a crossing loop in Zelenoroshchinsky Selsoviet of Rebrikhinsky District of Altai Krai
- Dalny, Rubtsovsky District, Altai Krai, a settlement in Dalny Selsoviet of Rubtsovsky District of Altai Krai
- Dalneye, Astrakhan Oblast, a selo in Limansky District
- Dalny, Republic of Bashkortostan, a khutor in Shingak-Kulsky Selsoviet of Chishminsky District of the Republic of Bashkortostan
- Dalny, Belgorod Oblast, a settlement in Dalnensky Rural Okrug of Valuysky District of Belgorod Oblast
- Dalny, Irkutsk Oblast, a settlement in Nizhneilimsky District of Irkutsk Oblast
- Dalny, Kamchatka Krai, a settlement in Yelizovsky District of Kamchatka Krai
- Dalny, Khanty-Mansi Autonomous Okrug, a settlement in Kondinsky District of Khanty-Mansi Autonomous Okrug
- Dalny, Dinskoy District, Krasnodar Krai, a settlement in Novovelichkovsky Rural Okrug of Dinskoy District of Krasnodar Krai
- Dalny, Gulkevichsky District, Krasnodar Krai, a settlement in Kuban Rural Okrug of Gulkevichsky District of Krasnodar Krai
- Dalny, Novokubansky District, Krasnodar Krai, a settlement in Verkhnekubansky Rural Okrug of Novokubansky District of Krasnodar Krai
- Dalny, Starominsky District, Krasnodar Krai, a settlement in Rassvetovsky Rural Okrug of Starominsky District of Krasnodar Krai
- Dalny, Tbilissky District, Krasnodar Krai, a khutor in Geymanovsky Rural Okrug of Tbilissky District of Krasnodar Krai
- Dalny, Yeysky District, Krasnodar Krai, a settlement in Trudovoy Rural Okrug of Yeysky District of Krasnodar Krai
- Dalny, Krasnoyarsk Krai, a settlement in Balaysky Selsoviet of Uyarsky District of Krasnoyarsk Krai
- Dalny, Leningrad Oblast, a logging depot settlement under the administrative jurisdiction of Vyritskoye Settlement Municipal Formation in Gatchinsky District of Leningrad Oblast
- Dalny, Lipetsk Oblast, a settlement in Kalikinsky Selsoviet of Dobrovsky District of Lipetsk Oblast
- Dalny, Republic of Mordovia, a settlement in Dalny Selsoviet of Lyambirsky District of the Republic of Mordovia
- Dalny, Alexandrovsky District, Orenburg Oblast, a settlement in Kalikinsky Selsoviet of Alexandrovsky District of Orenburg Oblast
- Dalny, Totsky District, Orenburg Oblast, a settlement in Suvorovsky Selsoviet of Totsky District of Orenburg Oblast
- Dalny, Dubovsky District, Rostov Oblast, a khutor in Prisalskoye Rural Settlement of Dubovsky District of Rostov Oblast
- Dalny, Proletarsky District, Rostov Oblast, a khutor in Dalnenskoye Rural Settlement of Proletarsky District of Rostov Oblast
- Dalny, Samara Oblast, a settlement in Alexeyevsky District of Samara Oblast
- Dalny, Alexandrovo-Gaysky District, Saratov Oblast, a khutor in Alexandrovo-Gaysky District, Saratov Oblast
- Dalny, Krasnopartizansky District, Saratov Oblast, a settlement in Krasnopartizansky District, Saratov Oblast
- Dalny, Sverdlovsk Oblast, a settlement in Prigorodny District of Sverdlovsk Oblast
- Dalny, Volgograd Oblast, a settlement in Logovsky Selsoviet of Kalachyovsky District of Volgograd Oblast

== Historical localities ==
- Dalny, Russian name of Dalian, a city in China occupied by the Russians in 1898–1905 as Russian Dalian
