= Omolon (disambiguation) =

The Omolon is a large river in far eastern Russia.

Omolon may also refer to:

- Omolon (rural locality), a rural locality (a selo) in Chukotka Autonomous Okrug, Russia
  - Omolon Airport
- Omolon (meteorite), a meteorite fallen in Russia
- Nelbert Omolon
