= Ostrovnoy =

Ostrovnoy (Russian: Островно́й; masculine), Ostrovnaya (Островна́я; feminine), or Ostrovnoye (Островно́е; neuter) is a toponym:

== Urban localities ==
- Ostrovnoy, Murmansk Oblast, a closed town in Murmansk Oblast; 68°3′N 39°30′E

== Rural localities ==
- Ostrovnoy, Primorsky Krai (or Ostrovnoye), a selo in Krasnoarmeysky District of Primorsky Krai
- Ostrovnoye, Altai Krai, a selo in Ostrovnovsky Selsoviet of Mamontovsky District in Altai Krai; 52°42′N 81°42′E
- Ostrovnoye, Chukotka Autonomous Okrug, a selo in Bilibinsky District of Chukotka Autonomous Okrug
- Ostrovnoye, Kaliningrad Oblast, a settlement in Timiryazevsky Rural Okrug of Slavsky District in Kaliningrad Oblast
- Ostrovnoye, Lebyazhyevsky District, Kurgan Oblast, a village in Lisyevsky Selsoviet of Lebyazhyevsky District in Kurgan Oblast; 55°13′N 66°48′E
- Ostrovnoye, Mishkinsky District, Kurgan Oblast (or Ostrovnaya), a selo in Ostrovninsky Selsoviet of Mishkinsky District in Kurgan Oblast; 55°21′N 63°50′E
- Ostrovnoye, Orenburg Oblast, a selo in Novocherkassky Selsoviet of Saraktashsky District in Orenburg Oblast
- Ostrovnoye, Sverdlovsk Oblast, a settlement under the administrative jurisdiction of the City of Beryozovsky in Sverdlovsk Oblast
- Ostrovnaya, Omsk Oblast, a village in Khutorsky Rural Okrug of Tyukalinsky District in Omsk Oblast; 56°21′N 72°9′E

== Other ==
- Bolshoye Ostrovnoye, a lake in Altai Krai
- Mayak-Ostrovnoy (sometimes referred to as Ostrovnoy), a lighthouse classified as an inhabited locality in Lazovsky District of Primorsky Krai
