= Vesenny, Chukotka Autonomous Okrug =

Vesenny Весенний
- Work settlement (abolished)
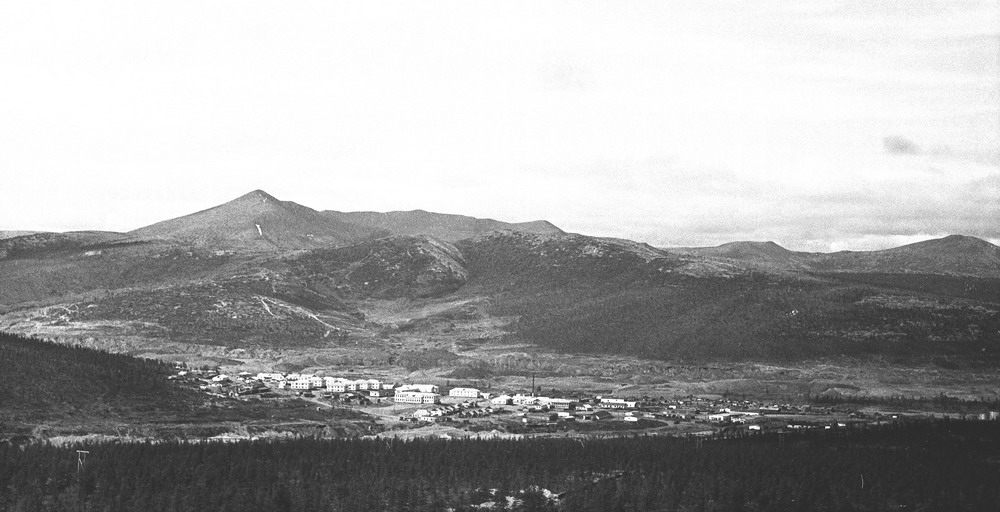
- View of Vesenny, 1982.
- Interactive map of Vesenny
- Location of Vesenny Vesenny (Chukotka Autonomous Okrug)
- Coordinates: 66°27′11″N 164°34′59″E
- Country: Russia
- Federal subject: Chukotka Autonomous Okrug
- Administrative district: Bilibinsky District
- Founded: 1965
- Abolished: 1998

Population
  - Estimate (June 2005): 4 )
- Time zone: UTC+12 (MSK+9)
- Postal code: 689450
- OKTMO ID: 77609701907

Vesenny (Russian: Весенний, literally meaning spring) is an urban-type settlement south west of Bilibino in Bilibinsky District (Raion), Chukotka Autonomous Okrug and part of the Far Eastern Federal District of Russia. Population as of 2005: 4.

== History ==
=== Soviet period ===
The village was founded in spring 1965, hence its name, although local history records that the reason the settlement was so called was because spring was always said to come earlier to this part of Chukotka than any other part of the Okrug. Twenty years after the foundation of the settlement, it boasted a health center and a clinic, sauna, laundry service, savings bank, two hotels, a kindergarten and 205 children enrolled in secondary school. The location of the settlement was initially not entirely successful. The first buildings were situated too close to the mine workings and so as the village began to grow new buildings were constructed further up the slope. there were also difficulties getting fresh water to the settlement. In the summer, tankers delivered water to the settlement from a nearby creek. In winter, water had to be brought from the Anyuy river some 40 km away. When neither of these options was feasible, water had to be used that had collected in reservoirs formed by the waste pits from mining activities.

=== Post-Soviet period ===
The settlement was abandoned when the extraction of gold was no longer economically viable. The mines were declared unprofitable and that there was no possibility of developing any other form of economy in 1999 and the settlement was closed along with a number of others in Chukotka. The Russian government guaranteed funds to transport non-working pensioners and the unemployed in liquidated settlements including Vesseny from Chukotka to other parts of Russia. The Ministry of railways was obliged to lease containers for the transportation of the migrants' goods to the Chukotkan administration and ensure that they were delivered to the various settlements. As of 2008 is in the process of being officially liquidated, despite the fact that a handful of people continued to reside in the settlement according to an environmental impact report for the Kupol Gold Project. There is a small work group still mining the area called "Ray" (Russian: Луч).

== Transport ==
Vesseny is not linked to any other place by permanent road, though there is a small network of roads within the settlement, including:

- Улица 60 лет ВЛКСМ (Ulitsa 60 let VLKSM, lit. 60 years of VLSKM Street)
- Улица Берзина (Ulitsa Berzina, lit. Berzin Street)
- Улица Лесная (Ulitsa Lesnaya, lit. Forest Street)
- Улица Летучего (Ulitsa Letuchego, lit. Flying Street)
- Улица Механизаторов (Ulitsa Mekhanizatorov, lit. Machine Operators' Street)
- Улица Нагорная (Ulitsa Nagornaya)
- Улица Советская (Ulitsa Sovyetskaya, lit. Soviet Street)
- Улица Южная (Ulitsa Yuzhnaya, lit. South Street)

== See also ==
- List of inhabited localities in Bilibinsky District
