= Anyuysk =

Anyuysk Анюйск
- Selo
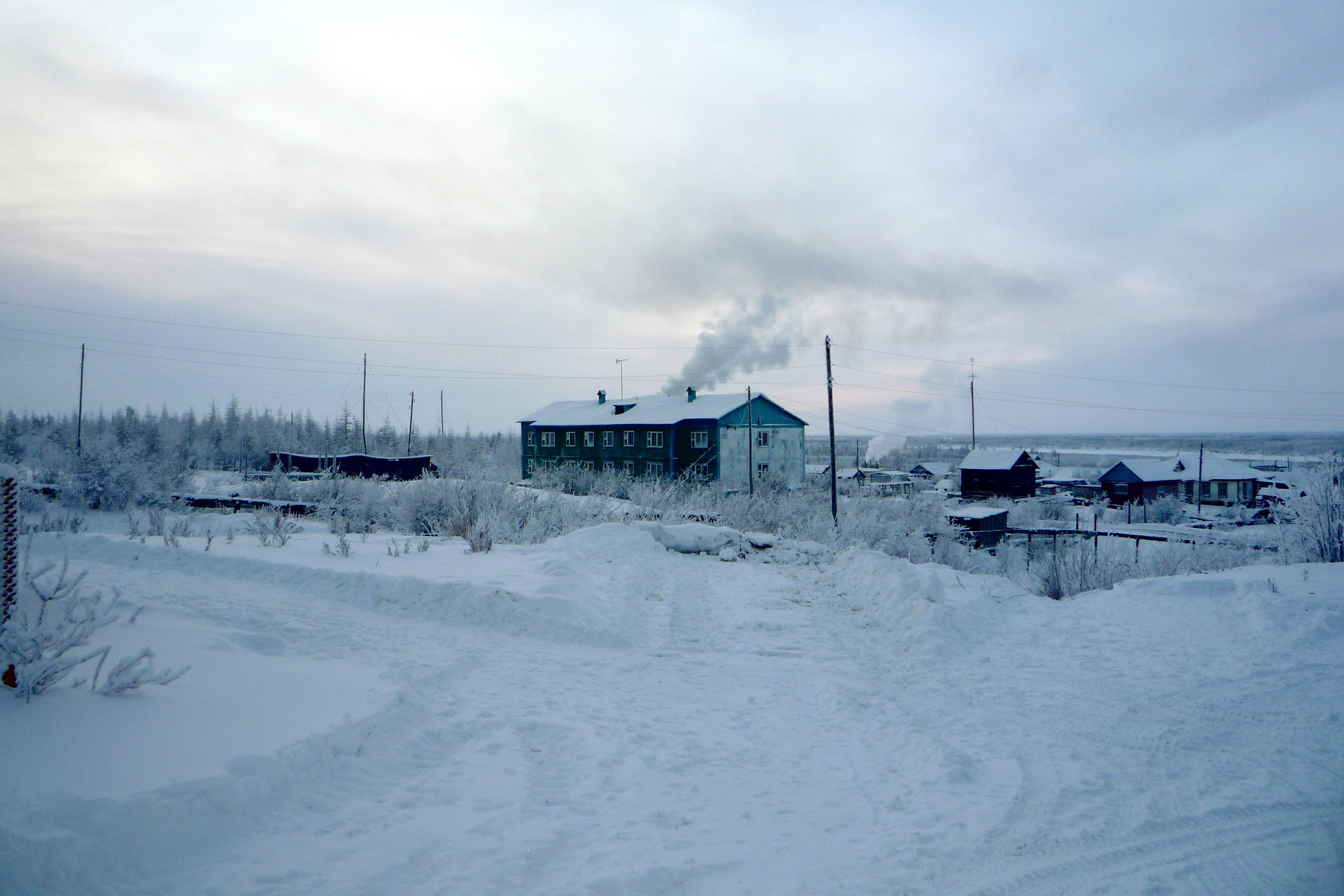
- Winter view of Anyuysk
- Interactive map of Anyuysk
- Location of Anyuysk Anyuysk (Chukotka Autonomous Okrug)
- Coordinates: 68°18′N 161°38′E
- Country: Russia
- Federal subject: Chukotka Autonomous Okrug
- Administrative district: Bilibinsky District
- Founded: 1930

Area
  - Total: 2.83 km^{2} (1.09 sq mi)

Population (2010 Census)
  - Total: 480
  - Estimate (January 2018): 396 (−17.5%)
  - Density: 170/km^{2} (440/sq mi)

Municipal status
  - Municipal district: Bilibinsky Municipal District
  - Rural settlement: Anyuysk Rural Settlement
  - Capital of: Anyuysk Rural Settlement
- Time zone: UTC+12 (MSK+9)
- Postal code: 689460
- Dialing code: +7 42738
- OKTMO ID: 77609403101

Anyuysk (Russian: Аню́йск) is a rural locality (a selo) in Bilibinsky District in Chukotka Autonomous Okrug, Russia, located west of Bilibino on the border with the Sakha Republic and on the banks of the Maly Anyuy River. The village is 272 km to Bilibino and approximately 800 km to Anadyr. Population: 480 (2010 census); Municipally, Anyuysk is subordinated to Bilibinsky Municipal District and is incorporated as Anyuysk Rural Settlement.

== History ==
The village was founded in 1930 as a result of the collectivisation of a number of nomadic herders who settled in the village establishing two collective farms: "First of May" (Russian: Первое мая) and "New Life" (Russian: Новая жизнь). Once the farms were established the village grew rapidly and a boarding school and kindergarten were constructed. These farms were reorganised into a single entity in 1960 under the name "Anyuysky". Anyuysk was the administrative centre of Bilibino District (then called Eastern Tundra District (Russian: Восточно-Тундровского района)) from March 15, 1950, when it took over responsibilities from Ostrovnoye until August 2, 1961, when responsibilities passed to the current administrative centre, Bilibino. In the 1980s a dairy farm was established in order to provide milk to the school and the villagers.

== Economy ==
The main occupation of the inhabitants is reindeer herding and fishing, hunting and trapping. Currently, Anyuysk is the base for the municipal agricultural enterprise "Lakeside". The village has a school, local hospital, post office, communications center, a cultural center, a library, a hotel with ten beds.

== Culture ==
The village holds an annual bear festival. There is a children's group called Souvenir (Russian: Сувенир), a sports, dance and singing club called Masteritsa (Russian: Мастерица) and a folk dance ensemble called Nyoltyn (Russian: Нёлтын).

== Demographics ==
The population as of the beginning of January 2012 was 472, mainly Evens, a slight reduction on the 2010 official census figure of 480, split equally between men and women. As of January 2012, the ethnic make up of the village was as following:

Demographic Composition – 2012
Indigenous People	Number in Village	Percentage of Population
Even	259	55%
Russian, Ukrainian and Others	200	42%
Chukchi	13	3%
Total	472	100%

This is down on the population as of 2006, which was around 600 people, of which 340 were natives, which itself was up from 535 people reported in 2005 in an environmental impact report for the Kupol Gold Project. The head of the village administration is Andrey Kulinenko.

== Transport ==
Anyuysk is not connected by permanent road to any other populated settlement however, there is a tractor road linking the village to Chersky, an urban locality (a settlement) and the administrative center of Nizhnekolymsky District of the Sakha Republic via the settlement of Panteleyikha, also in the Sakha Republic. The Maly Anyuy River also links Anyuysk to the Kolyma River and other settlements such as Nizhnekolymsk. There is however, a network of roads within the village including:

- Улица Василия Драного (Ulitsa Vasiliya Dranogo, lit. Vasiliy Drany Street)
- Улица Гагарина (Ulitsa Gagarina, lit. Gagarin Street)
- Улица Клубная (Ulitsa Klubnaya, lit. Club Street)
- Улица Лесаковского (Ulitsa Lesakovskogo, lit. Lesakovsky Street)
- Улица Лесная (Ulitsa Lesnaya, lit. Forest Street)
- Улица Мира (Ulitsa Mira, lit. Peace Street)
- Улица Набережная (Ulitsa Naberezhnaya, lit. Quay Street)
- Улица Новая (Ulitsa Novaya, lit. New Street)
- Улица Полярная (Ulitsa Polyarnaya, lit. Polar Street)
- Улица Почтовая (Ulitsa Pochtovaya, lit. Postal Street)
- Улица Ручейная (Ulitsa Rucheinaya, lit. Brook Street)
- Улица Советская (Ulitsa Sovetskaya, lit. Soviet Street)
- Улица Черского (Ulitsa Cherskogo, lit. Chersky Street)
- Улица Юбилейная (Ulitsa Jubileinaya, lit. Jubilee Street)

== Climate ==
Anyuysk has a Continental Subarctic or Boreal (taiga) climate' (Dfc).

Climate data for Anyuysk
Month	Jan	Feb	Mar	Apr	May	Jun	Jul	Aug	Sep	Oct	Nov	Dec	Year
Record high °C (°F)	0.8 (33.4)	−1 (30)	3.1 (37.6)	10.1 (50.2)	27 (81)	32.1 (89.8)	35 (95)	29.7 (85.5)	21.1 (70.0)	11.7 (53.1)	3.8 (38.8)	5.1 (41.2)	35 (95)
Mean daily maximum °C (°F)	−30.4 (−22.7)	−27.6 (−17.7)	−18.6 (−1.5)	−9.2 (15.4)	5 (41)	15.3 (59.5)	17.8 (64.0)	14 (57)	6.5 (43.7)	−6.7 (19.9)	−19 (−2)	−28 (−18)	−6.7 (19.9)
Mean daily minimum °C (°F)	−36.7 (−34.1)	−34.4 (−29.9)	−28.1 (−18.6)	−20 (−4)	−4.8 (23.4)	4.8 (40.6)	7.5 (45.5)	5.4 (41.7)	−0.2 (31.6)	−12.9 (8.8)	−25.8 (−14.4)	−34.3 (−29.7)	−15 (5)
Record low °C (°F)	−51.5 (−60.7)	−50.3 (−58.5)	−44.4 (−47.9)	−38 (−36)	−25.6 (−14.1)	−8 (18)	−5.1 (22.8)	−3 (27)	−11 (12)	−33.8 (−28.8)	−43.8 (−46.8)	−49.3 (−56.7)	−51.5 (−60.7)
Average rainfall mm (inches)	6.4 (0.25)	6.2 (0.24)	6.1 (0.24)	7.3 (0.29)	6.4 (0.25)	14.9 (0.59)	25 (1.0)	27.5 (1.08)	18.1 (0.71)	15.9 (0.63)	10.5 (0.41)	7.8 (0.31)	152.1 (5.99)
Average snowy days	16	13	13	11	8	2	0	1	7	18	17	16	122

== See also ==
- List of inhabited localities in Bilibinsky District
