= Anadyr Highway =

Road in Russia

The Anadyr Highway

The Anadyr Highway is a highway on the territory of Magadan Oblast and the Chukotka Autonomous Okrug from the R504 Kolyma Highway to the city of Anadyr with branches to Bilibino, Komsomolsky and Egvekinot. In the Magadan Region it is numbered 44H-3; in Chukotka the existing segments have the number 77K-022. The new highway will ensure the year-round connection of the Chukotka Autonomous Okrug with the rest of Russia.

Construction of the road in the Chukotka Autonomous Okrug began in 2012. Construction in the Magadan Region began in 2015. The original plan estimated that it would require 30 years to complete. In some parts of the build, winter lasts 10 months and its temperatures can go below −60 °C.

== Route ==
The route starts from the R504 Kolyma Highway, revitalizing the old road to Omsukchan, then passes through Omolon, Ilirney, Palyavaam, then along the existing extended winter road to Valunistoye mine, where it turns south towards Anadyr. The total length is about 2,300 km (1,429 mi), of which 829 km (515 mi) pass through the Magadan Region, and about 1,400 km (870 mi) through Chukotka.

== Features ==
The road has the lowest technical category, without asphalt. The roadway will be treated with binder additives, which increase the resistance of the upper layer. The width of the single-lane roadway is 4.5 m (15 ft), with passing areas. The roadsides are equipped with snow protection fences, signal posts and road signs. The maximum speed is limited to 60 km/h (37 mph).

== Construction ==
The whole route passes through a territory bounded by permafrost, therefore, the laying of the roadbed is done without disrupting the integrity of the moss-vegetation layer of the tundra, which is a good heat insulator that does not allow defrosting of the upper layer of permafrost, which can lead to the destruction of the road. In the marshy areas, geotextiles and geogrids are also used; the slopes of the embankment and the culverts are strengthened by multicellular mattresses. Aggregate for the roadbed is mined in roadside quarries, while in some places drilling and blasting are necessary. Engineering materials are imported during the period of summer navigation from the central regions of the country. Due to extreme climatic conditions, construction is suspended in summer during heavy rains, in winter in cases of particularly low air temperature and severe snowstorms.

== Current state ==
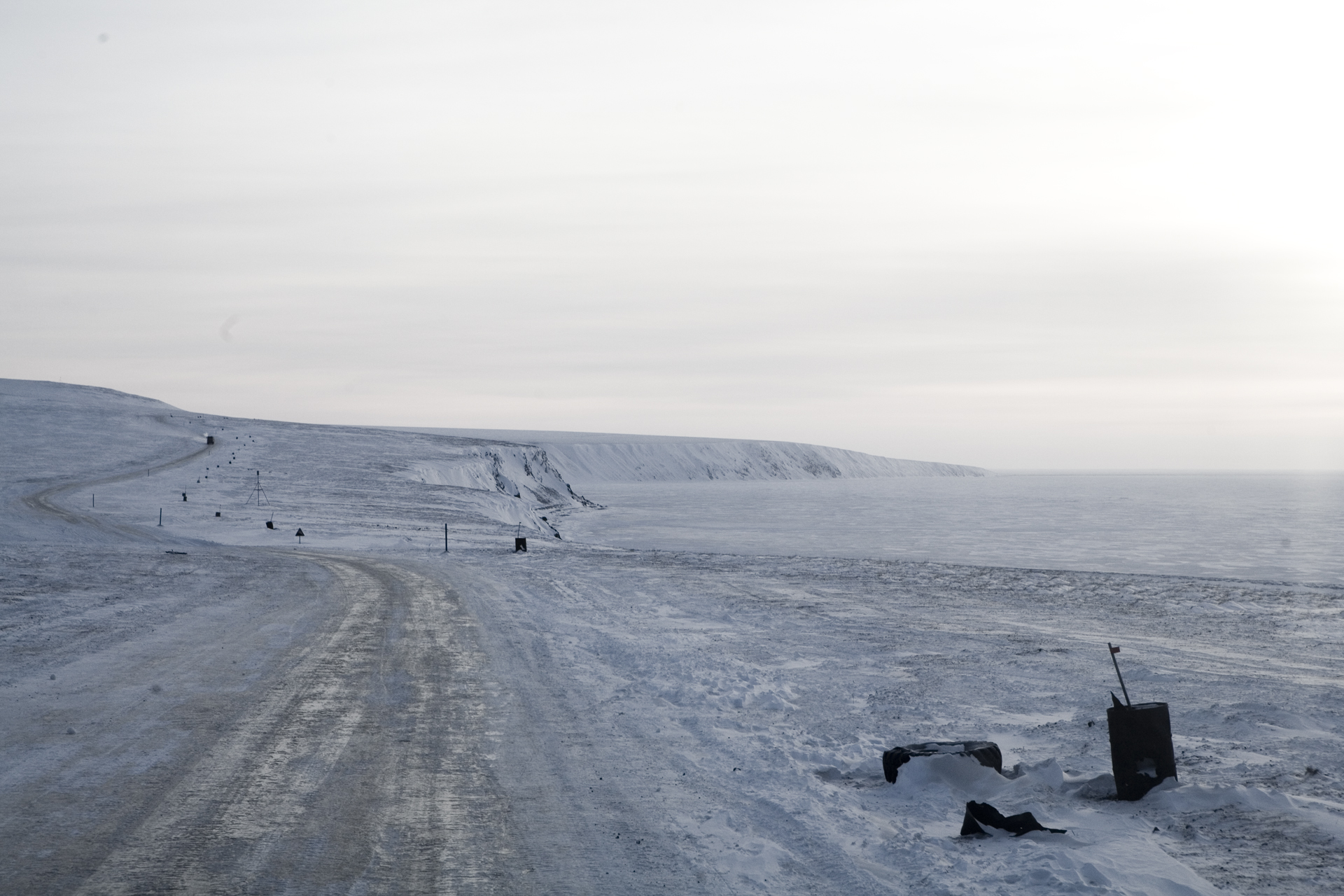
Winter Road Pevek-Kupol

A bridge across the Palyavaam River was built in 2003, by the Artel of Miners of Chukotka LLC. A contract was signed with Stroydor company about building the 573 km (356 mi) Omsukchan–Omolon road and fixing the older 256 km (159 mi) Gerba–Omsukchan road, for RUB 1.53 bn. Works have been started at Omsukchan. By 2018, the total length of the constructed sections of the route should be 128 km (80 mi). In October 2017, the first 25 km (16 mi) was finished, although, in 2018, the road was considered of bad quality.

In early 2016, a design procedure was announced, which will plan the Omolon–Ilirney–Anadyr section with branches to Bilibino, Komsomolsky and Egvekinot.

As of 2018, it is possible to drive in summer in cross-country vehicles Egvekinot – Valunistoye – Palyavaam – Bilibino, in winter there is a convoy. Travel to Omolon and Omsukchan, as well as from Valunistoye mine to Anadyr is possible only by the winter road.

== Financing ==
The project is financed under the federal target program "Economic and Social Development of the Far East and Trans-Baikal Region for the Period until 2013" and "Improvement and Development of the Chukotka Autonomous Okrug Road Network for 2010–2013". The total construction budget in 2012 prices is about 150 billion rubles. For comparison, the cost of an annual Northern delivery to the territory of Chukotka is estimated at 3 billion rubles (excluding storage).

== Criticism ==
There are opinions that the implementation of the project will be extremely inefficient due to the enormous financial costs and technological complexity of this project. Due to the long distances and low road quality, passenger travel will still use aircraft most of the time. There is also a very low amount of motorization in the region (5 times less than Moscow). The savings in freight cost (even measured over multiple decades) will be less than the road construction cost.
