= KPX =

KPX or kpx can refer to:

- Mountain Koiali language, Trans-New Guinea language spoken in Papua New Guinea
- Korea Power Exchange
- KPX file format used by Kid Pix
- Kupol Airport, located in Chukotka Autonomous Okrug, Russia
