= Vstrechny =

Vstrechny may refer to:

- Vstrechny, Chukotka Autonomous Okrug, an urban-type settlement in Chukotka Autonomous Okrug, Russia
- Vstrechny, Samara Oblast, a rural locality (a settlement) in Samara Oblast, Russia
- Vstrechny, Stavropol Krai, a rural locality (a settlement) in Stavropol Krai, Russia
