= Kupol Airport =

Airport in the Russian Far East

Kupol Airport Аэропорт Купол
- IATA: KPX; ICAO: UHEK; LID: КУП

Summary
- Airport type: Public
- Owner/Operator: Kinross Gold
- Serves: Kupol Gold Mine
- Location: 12 km North from Kupol Gold Mine; Bilibinsky District; Chukotka Autonomous Okrug; Russia
- Opened: 2009
- Time zone: +11 (UTC+11:00)
- Elevation AMSL: 1,745 ft / 532 m
- Coordinates: 66°54′06″N 169°33′36″E

Map
- Location in Russia KPX (Earth)

Runways
Direction	Length		Surface
Direction	ft	m	Surface
01/19	6,003	1,830	Gravel

Kupol Airport is an airport which services the eponymously named gold and silver mine, which is one of the largest gold and silver mines in the Russian Far East.

It was built by the Kinross Gold Corporation. It is used to support the needs of its enterprise's operations in the Anadyr region of the Chukotka Autonomous Okrug (400 km northwest of the city of Anadyr).

The nearest village is Ilirney, located 96 km from airport.

== Climate ==
The airport is placed in the permafrost zone with a subarctic climate. The cold season lasts about 8 months.

== Facilities ==
The airport only operates based on its scheduled flights. It is able to handle aircraft such as the Bombardier Q Series, Antonov An-12, Antonov An-74, Antonov An-140, Antonov An-24, Antonov An-26, Yak-40, and helicopters of all types.

Aircraft at Kupol Airport

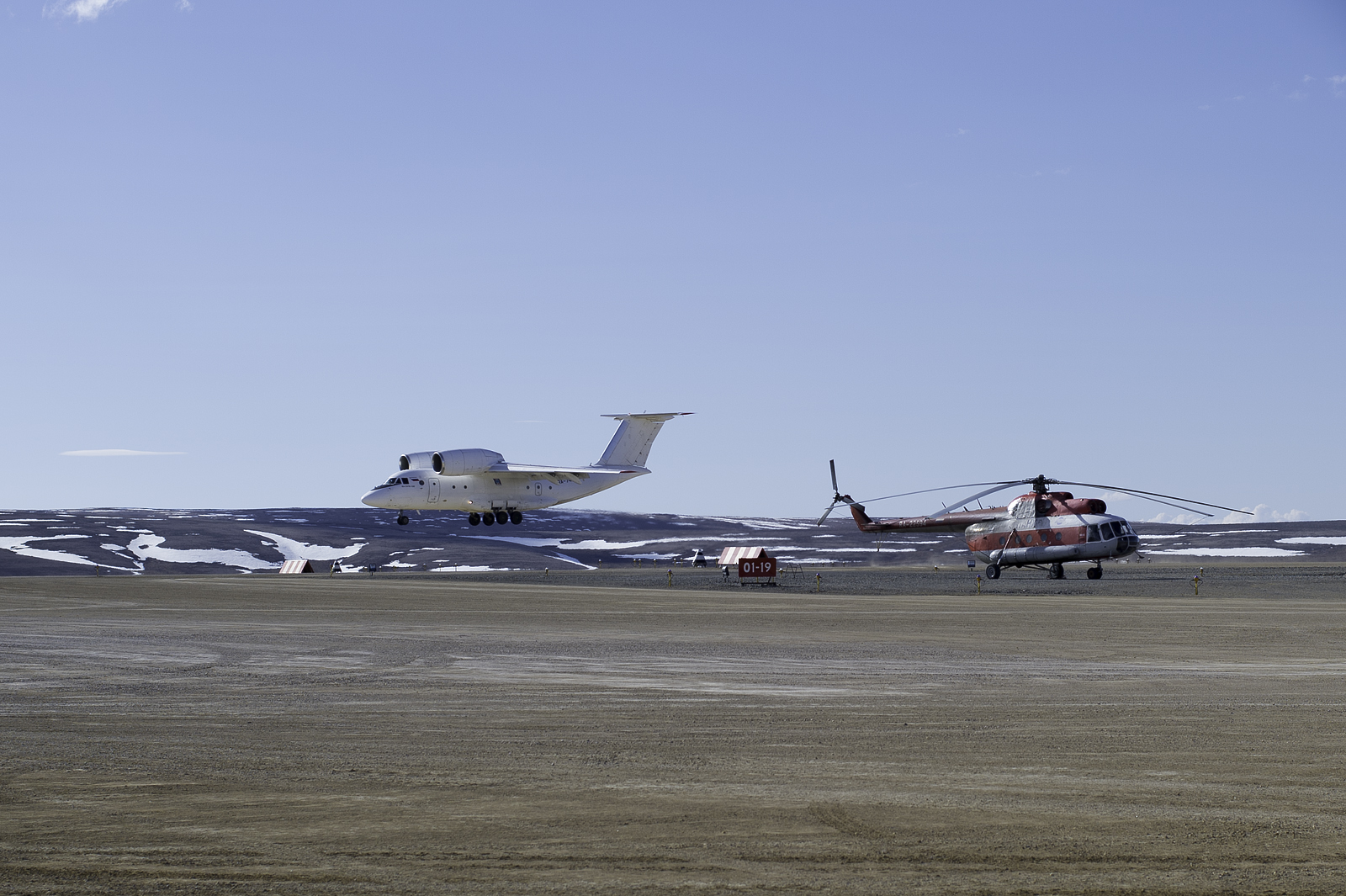
An-74 landing

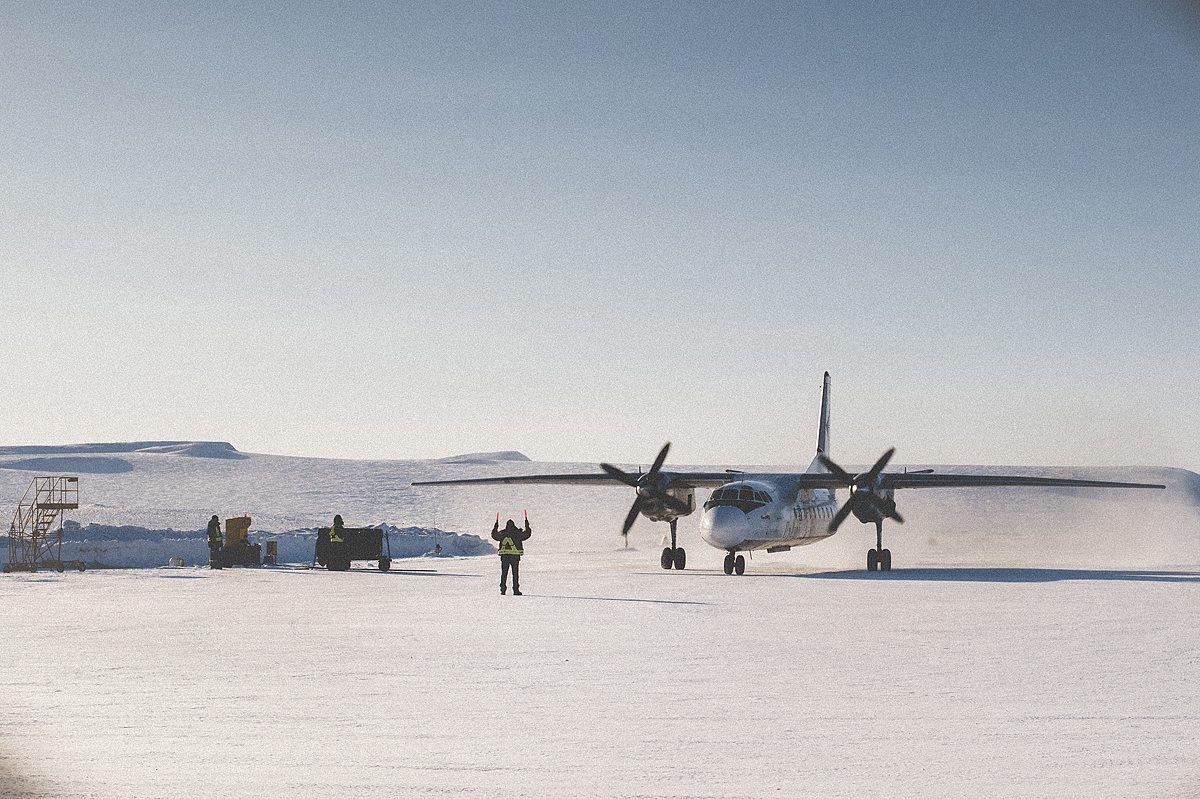
An-24

== Airlines and destinations ==
Airlines	Destinations
Aurora	Magadan

== Accidents and incidents ==
- On 7 March 2019, a Bombardier DHC 8-Q400 run by Aurora, en route from Magadan, rolled off the runway at 12:30 pm, damaging the runway's light-signaling equipment. On board, there were 68 passengers and 5 crew members. There were no injuries, and the airplane received minimal damage. The lights were replaced the same day and the airport remained functional.

== See also ==
- List of airports in Russia
