= Lake Tytyl =

Lake in Russia

Tytyl
- Тытыль (Russian)
- Location within Russia
- Location: Bilibinsky District, Chukotka Autonomous Okrug
- Coordinates: 67°21′N 169°23′E
- Primary inflows: Tytylvaam, Tytliutin
- Primary outflows: Tytylvaam
- Basin countries: Russia
- Max. length: 10 km (6.2 mi)
- Max. width: 4.3 km (2.7 mi)
- Surface area: 40.5 km^{2} (15.6 sq mi)
- Surface elevation: 485 m (1,591 ft)

Lake Tytyl (Ozero Tytyl) is a lake of Bilibinsky District, Chukotka Autonomous Okrug, Russia.

== Geography ==
The lake has a basin area of 912 km^{2} (352 sq mi). River Tytylvaam flows from it. It is located east of Lake Ilirney, at the feet of the southern slopes of the Ilirney Range, in the upper reaches of the Maly Anyuy River, 55 km from Ilirney village. Its name originated in the Chukchi word for "entrance gate".

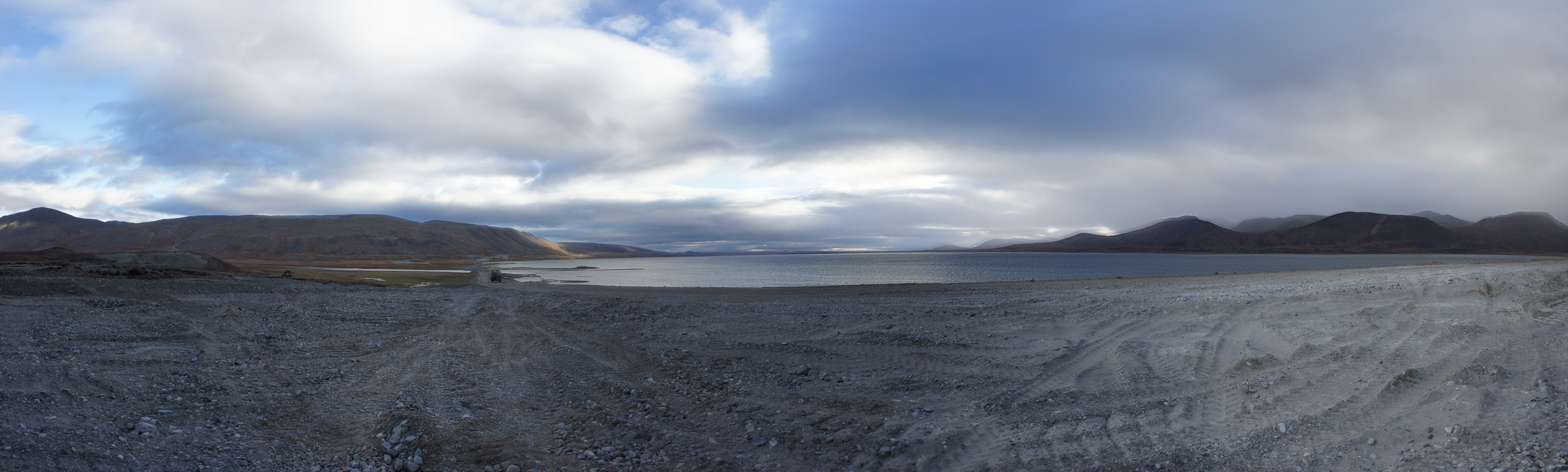
View of Tytyl Lake with the mountains of the Ilirney Range rising above it.

== See also ==
- List of lakes of Russia
