= Ostrovnoye, Chukotka Autonomous Okrug =

Ostrovnoye Островное
- Selo
- Interactive map of Ostrovnoye
- Location of Ostrovnoye Ostrovnoye (Chukotka Autonomous Okrug)
- Coordinates: 68°03′N 164°09′E
- Country: Russia
- Federal subject: Chukotka Autonomous Okrug
- Administrative district: Bilibinsky District
- Founded: 1930

Area
  - Total: 1.54 km^{2} (0.59 sq mi)

Population (2010 Census)
  - Total: 384
  - Estimate (January 2018): 376 (−2.1%)
  - Density: 249/km^{2} (646/sq mi)

Municipal status
  - Municipal district: Bilibinsky Municipal District
  - Rural settlement: Ostrovnoye Rural Settlement
  - Capital of: Ostrovnoye Rural Settlement
- Time zone: UTC+12 (MSK+9)
- Postal code: 689465
- Dialing code: +7 42738
- OKTMO ID: 77609433101

Ostrovnoye (Russian: Островно́е; Chukot: Ыпаԓгын, Ypaḷgyn) is a rural locality (a selo) in Bilibinsky District of Chukotka Autonomous Okrug, Russia, located on the banks of the Maly Anyuy River about 40 kilometers (25 mi) upstream from Anyuysk and about 179 kilometers (111 mi) from the administrative center of the district, Bilibino and 690 kilometers (430 mi) from Anadyr. Population: 379 (2010 est.), of which 317 were indigenous peoples. Population: 384 (2010 census); Municipally, Ostrovnoye is subordinated to Bilibinsky Municipal District and is incorporated as Ostrovnoye Rural Settlement.

== History ==
Ostrovnoye is a historical locality in the region, as it was the site of an ostrog built as Russians began to explore and lay claim to the region, and was the site of trade fairs between Russians and natives. The ruins of the Ostrog are still visible not far from the village. Since the beginning of the 18th century Russian explorers began active exploration of Kolyma and Chukotka, and the settlements they established were essentially fortresses, among them Anyuysky Ostrog, where the Anyuysk Fair was held, the largest in Chutkotka. The Ostrog was situated on an island in the Lesser Anyuy. However, because of constant spring flooding of the river the fair was repeatedly postponed until 1848 after a flood, which destroyed most of the island and the Ostrog itself, the settlement was moved to the left bank, 10 km downstream. However, the locals traditionally called this fortress "Island" and so that was the name that was assigned to the modern village, standing on the site of the former Ostrog.

In December 1930, the National district of Chukotka was established, consisting of Anadyrsky (Russian: Анадырский), Chukotsky (Чукотский), Markovsky (Марковский), Chaunsky (Чаунский), Eastern Tundra (Восточной Тундры, which was to become Bilibinsky District) and Western Tundra (Западной тундры) districts. Ostrovnoye was appointed as the first administrative centre of the new Eastern Tundra district with authority over six separate selsoviets, namely: Greater Yenyuisky (Russian: Больше-Энюйский), Lesser Yenyuisky (Мало-Энюйский), Oloysky (Олойский), Oloychansky (Олойчанский), Ostrovnovsky (Островновский) and Pogyndinsky (Погындинский).

The village was the site of the first Chukchi collective farm, "Turvaurgyn" (Russian: Турваургин, literally "New Life" in Chukchi), which was later reorganised into a farm called Ostrovnoye. By 1934, the village was equipped with a hospital, bakery and radio transmitter.

== Demographics ==
Based on a 2006 estimate, the population of Ostrovnoye was 420, of which 340 were indigenous peoples. This is an increase from the 2005 population of 355 according to an environmental impact report on the Kupol Gold Project.

The population as of the beginning of January 2012 was 379, mainly Chukchi, representing a slight reduction on the 2010 official census record, of whom 183 were male and 201 female.

As of January 2012, the ethnic make up of the village was as following:

Demographic Composition - 2012
Indigenous people	Number in the locality	Percentage of population
Chukchi	250	66%
Russians and Other nationalities	62	16%
Evens	46	12%
Nenets	19	1%
Others	2	<1%
Total	379	100%

Note: "Other nationalities" includes Ukrainians amongst others, "Others" are of unknown nationality, the ethnic breakdown provided by the official Bilibinsky District website does not equal the total population provided by the same source.

The head of the village is Yuri Vasilyevich Snitko.

== Climate ==
Ostrovnoye has a subarctic climate (Koppen Dfc) with very cold, dry winters, and very mild, somewhat wetter summers.

Climate data for Ostrovnoye
Month	Jan	Feb	Mar	Apr	May	Jun	Jul	Aug	Sep	Oct	Nov	Dec	Year
Record high °C (°F)	6.9 (44.4)	2.7 (36.9)	6.2 (43.2)	10.1 (50.2)	25.5 (77.9)	33.2 (91.8)	35.1 (95.2)	32.7 (90.9)	24.6 (76.3)	14.9 (58.8)	6.5 (43.7)	7.6 (45.7)	35.1 (95.2)
Mean daily maximum °C (°F)	−29.7 (−21.5)	−27.8 (−18.0)	−16.0 (3.2)	−4.7 (23.5)	8.0 (46.4)	18.8 (65.8)	20.8 (69.4)	16.3 (61.3)	8.1 (46.6)	−5.8 (21.6)	−18.4 (−1.1)	−28.3 (−18.9)	−4.9 (23.2)
Daily mean °C (°F)	−33.7 (−28.7)	−32.3 (−26.1)	−22.4 (−8.3)	−11.5 (11.3)	2.8 (37.0)	12.7 (54.9)	14.5 (58.1)	10.3 (50.5)	3.3 (37.9)	−9.4 (15.1)	−22.2 (−8.0)	−32.0 (−25.6)	−10.0 (14.0)
Mean daily minimum °C (°F)	−37.7 (−35.9)	−36.7 (−34.1)	−28.4 (−19.1)	−18.7 (−1.7)	−2.9 (26.8)	6.5 (43.7)	8.3 (46.9)	4.7 (40.5)	−0.8 (30.6)	−13.0 (8.6)	−26.1 (−15.0)	−35.7 (−32.3)	−15.0 (5.0)
Record low °C (°F)	−57.5 (−71.5)	−57.8 (−72.0)	−54.4 (−65.9)	−43.8 (−46.8)	−31.6 (−24.9)	−8.2 (17.2)	−5.7 (21.7)	−8.4 (16.9)	−21.6 (−6.9)	−39.1 (−38.4)	−49.6 (−57.3)	−56.8 (−70.2)	−57.8 (−72.0)
Average precipitation mm (inches)	13 (0.5)	11 (0.4)	10 (0.4)	6 (0.2)	11 (0.4)	32 (1.3)	39 (1.5)	37 (1.5)	26 (1.0)	19 (0.7)	19 (0.7)	16 (0.6)	239 (9.4)
Average precipitation days	15.1	11.9	10.2	7.7	7.0	9.1	11.4	12.4	11.9	16.0	14.2	13.3	140.2
Source: climatebase.ru (1936-2012)

== See also ==
- List of inhabited localities in Bilibinsky District
