= Ilirneyite =

Rare tellurite mineral

General
- Category: Tellurate
- Formula: Mg_{0.5}[ZnMn^{3+}(TeO_{3})_{3}]•4.5H_{2}O
- IMA symbol: Iny
- Crystal system: Hexagonal
- Crystal class: Dipyramidal (6/m); H-M symbol: (6/m)
- Space group: P6_{3}/m
- Unit cell: a = 9.40, c = 7.66 [Å]

Identification

Ilirneyite is a rare tellurite mineral with the formula Mg_{0.5}[ZnMn^{3+}(TeO_{3})_{3}]•4.5H_{2}O. It was discovered at the Sentyabr'skoe deposit (of silver and gold) in the Ilirney Range, Western Chukotka, Russia.

== Relation to other minerals ==
Ilirneyite is a trivalent-manganese-analogue of zemannite. It is also a zinc- and manganese-analogue of keystoneite and kinichilite.
