= Dalny, Chukotka Autonomous Okrug =

Dalny Дальний
- Work settlement (abolished)
- Interactive map of Dalny
- Location of Dalny Dalny (Chukotka Autonomous Okrug)
- Coordinates: 67°34′39″N 160°46′21″E
- Country: Russia
- Federal subject: Chukotka Autonomous Okrug
- Administrative district: Bilibinsky District
- Abolished: 1998

Population
  - Estimate (April 2012): 0 )
- Time zone: UTC+12 (MSK+9)
- Postal code: 689450
- OKTMO ID: 77609701917

Dalny (Russian: Да́льний, lit. remote or far) is an urban locality (a work settlement) in Bilibinsky District of Chukotka Autonomous Okrug, Russia, located west of Bilibino.

== History ==
The settlement was abandoned as a result of the extraction of gold no longer being economically viable. The mines were declared unprofitable and that there was no possibility of developing any other form of economy in 1999 and the settlement was closed along with a number of others in Chukotka. The Russian government guaranteed funds to transport non-working pensioners and the unemployed in liquidated settlements including Dalny from Chukotka to other parts of Russia. The Ministry of railways was obliged to lease containers for the transportation of the migrants' goods to the Chukotkan administration and ensure that they were delivered to the various settlements. Despite the mines closing, the Kupol Gold Project environmental impact assessment, still recorded three people remaining in the settlement as of 2005. However, as of 2008 is in the process of being officially liquidated, and a report on the Klen gold deposit for Highland Gold Mining Ltd reported the settlement as being deserted.

In 1981, one of the world's largest iron meteorites, named "Bilibino", was discovered near the settlement.

== Transport ==
Dalny is not connected to any other inhabited location by permanent road except the now abandoned settlement of Devichiy. However, there is a small network of roads within the settlement including:

- Улица Горняков (Ulitsa Gornyakov, lit. Miners' Street)
- Улица Зеленая (Ulitsa Zelenaya, lit. Green Street)
- Улица Набережная (Ulitsa Naberezhnaya, lit. Quay Street)
- Улица Речной (Ulitsa Rechnoi, lit. River Street)
- Улица Тополевая (Ulitsa Topolevaya, lit. Emperor Street)
- Улица Транспортная (Ulitsa Transportnaya, lit. Transport Street)
- Улица Центральная (Ulitsa Tsentralnaya, lit. Central Street)

== Climate ==
Dalny has a Continental Subarctic or Boreal (taiga) climate (Dfc).

Climate data for Dalny
Month	Jan	Feb	Mar	Apr	May	Jun	Jul	Aug	Sep	Oct	Nov	Dec	Year
Record high °C (°F)	−3.5 (25.7)	6.9 (44.4)	−1 (30)	8.2 (46.8)	24.1 (75.4)	32.6 (90.7)	34 (93)	30.4 (86.7)	24.2 (75.6)	14 (57)	−1.6 (29.1)	4 (39)	32.6 (90.7)
Mean daily maximum °C (°F)	−31.2 (−24.2)	−28.2 (−18.8)	−18.5 (−1.3)	−6.6 (20.1)	6.4 (43.5)	17.2 (63.0)	18.9 (66.0)	15.4 (59.7)	6.8 (44.2)	−7.1 (19.2)	−24.2 (−11.6)	−30.2 (−22.4)	−6.8 (19.8)
Mean daily minimum °C (°F)	−36.8 (−34.2)	−36 (−33)	−32.1 (−25.8)	−21.2 (−6.2)	−4.7 (23.5)	4.9 (40.8)	6.2 (43.2)	3.2 (37.8)	−1.9 (28.6)	−14.5 (5.9)	−30.3 (−22.5)	−35.4 (−31.7)	−16.6 (2.1)
Record low °C (°F)	−54.4 (−65.9)	−53 (−63)	−48.9 (−56.0)	−40.2 (−40.4)	−26.7 (−16.1)	−5.7 (21.7)	−3.4 (25.9)	−7 (19)	−16.4 (2.5)	−35 (−31)	−49.4 (−56.9)	−52.4 (−62.3)	−54.4 (−65.9)
Average rainfall mm (inches)	18 (0.7)	18 (0.7)	6 (0.2)	9 (0.4)	9 (0.4)	33 (1.3)	54 (2.1)	39 (1.5)	21 (0.8)	15 (0.6)	18 (0.7)	15 (0.6)	246 (9.7)
Average snowy days	31	27	20	12	7	2	0	0	8	20	25	31	176

== See also ==
- List of inhabited localities in Bilibinsky District
