= Ilirney =

Ilirney Илирней Иԓирӈэй (Chukchi)
- Selo
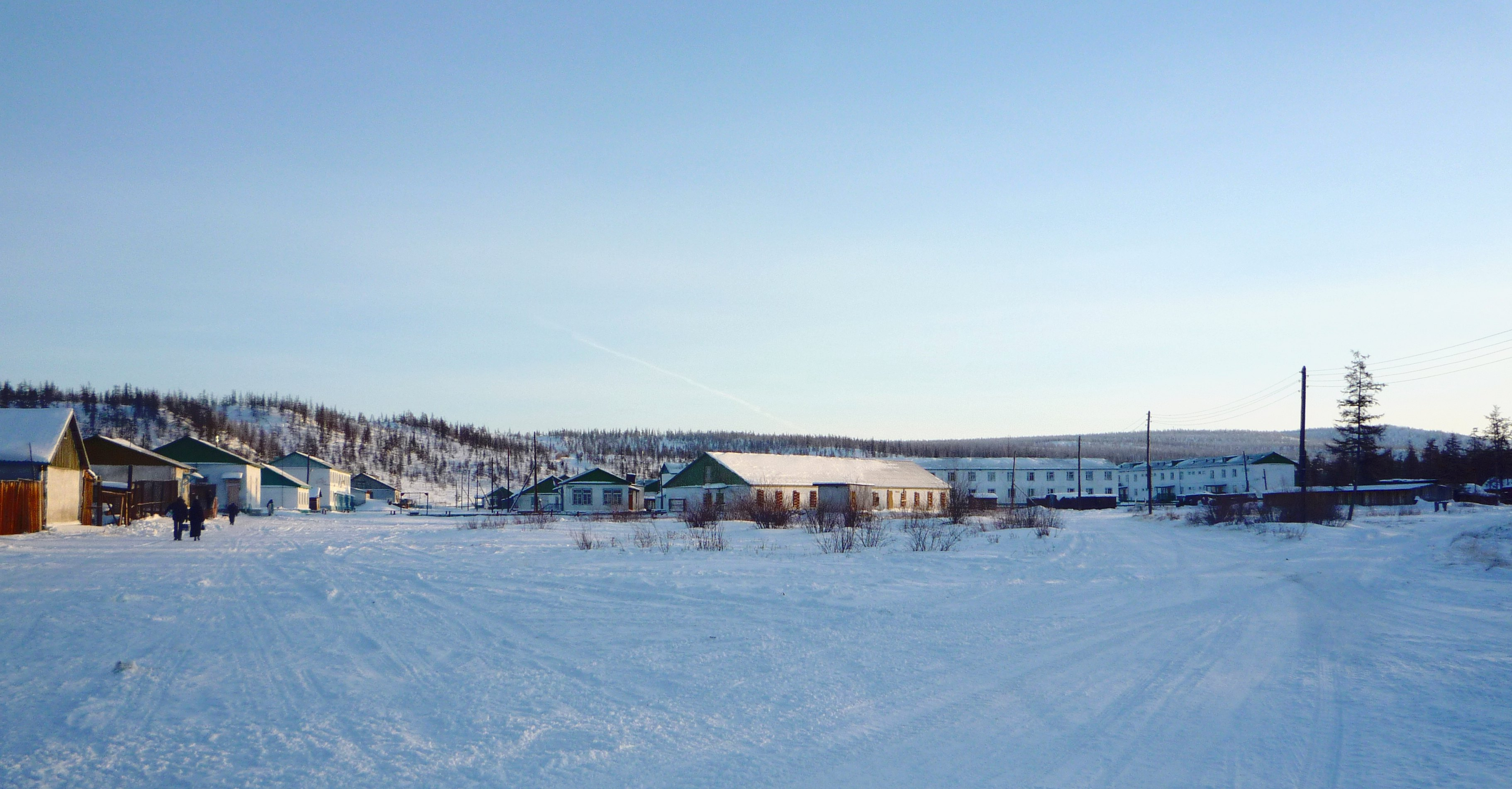
- Winter view of Ilirney
- Interactive map of Ilirney
- Location of Ilirney Ilirney (Chukotka Autonomous Okrug)
- Coordinates: 67°15′00″N 167°57′03″E
- Country: Russia
- Federal subject: Chukotka Autonomous Okrug
- Administrative district: Bilibinsky District
- Founded: 1940

Area
  - Total: 2.15 km^{2} (0.83 sq mi)

Population (2010 Census)
  - Total: 287
  - Estimate (January 2018): 252 (−12.2%)
  - Density: 133/km^{2} (346/sq mi)

Municipal status
  - Municipal district: Bilibinsky Municipal District
  - Rural settlement: Ilirney Rural Settlement
  - Capital of: Ilirney Rural Settlement
- Time zone: UTC+12 (MSK+9)
- Postal code: 689480
- Dialing code: +7 42738
- OKTMO ID: 77609415101

Ilirney (Russian: Илирней; Chukchi: Иԓирӈэй, Iḷirňèj, lit. mountain island) is a rural locality (a selo) in Bilibinsky District of Chukotka Autonomous Okrug, Russia, located southeast of Bilibino, on the banks of the Maly Anyuy River. The population of the village as of 2012 is 281, of which 247 are native Chukchi, a slight reduction on the most recent census data: 287 (2010 census); Municipally, Ilirney is subordinated to Bilibinsky Municipal District and is incorporated as Ilirney Rural Settlement.

== Geography ==
Ilirney is situated 168 km from the district center Bilibino and 510 km from Anadyr. At the site of the village, the Maly Anyuy River is joined by the Nutsekyn tributary, from the Chukchi word, Nutech'yn, meaning "white fat", since there is a band of white clay that looks like fat and was occasionally consumed by the local inhabitants in times of famine. Lake Ilirney is found at the feet of Ilirney Range, about 20 km (12 mi) northeast of the village. Archeologists discovered neolithic camps on the shore of the lake and about 46 km (29 mi) further upstream is Lake Tytyl where archeologists have also discovered neolithic encampments and where the inhabitants of the village have a permanent fishing co-operative on the shores.

== History ==
In 1945, a weather station was built on the shores of the Lower Ilirney lake, and not long after that a state farm specialising in reindeer herding was established, around which a settlement grew up. However, in 1954, the village was severely flooded and a decision was made to move the village 7 km upriver to prevent this from happening again. In the late 1950s there was a substantial expansion of the village, following the discovery of gold in the area and the subsequent mining developments to extract it. Additionally, the farm's name was changed to 40 Years of October (Russian: 40 лет Октября), and it became substantially more profitable as requirements from the expanding mining workforce increased demand significantly.

== Demographics ==
The population of the village as of January 2012 is 281 a reduction of 20 against the 2010 estimate of 301 (of which 247 were indigenous people), though this is higher than the official 2010 census result which recorded a population of 287, of whom 152 were male and 135 female. The 2010 estimate is the same as that made in 2005 as part of the environmental impact study by the Kupol gold project, which recorded a population of 233. In 2005 and 2012 the village was demographically organised thus:

Demographic Composition – 2005 and 2012
Indigenous People	Number in Village in 2005	Percentage of Population in 2005	Number in Village in 2012	Percentage of Population in 2012	Movement since 2005
Chukchi	217	72%	213	76%	-4
Russians and other nationalities	68	23%	55	20%	-13
Evens	10	3%	6	2%	-4
Koryaks	5	2%	5	2%	0
Yukaghir	1	<1%	2	1%	+1
Total	301	100%	281	100%	-20

Source: 2005 Data:
Source: 2012 Data:

The head of the rural settlement is Vladimir Kumlyu.

== Economy and culture ==
The main occupation of the inhabitants is reindeer herding and fishing and there is a central farm called "poplar" (Russian: Тополёвое) The village has a primary school, a kindergarten, a medical clinic, post office, communications center, a hotel with 20 beds, a cultural center, library, shop and bakery.

In the summer of 2009 on a small hill at the entrance to the village a large Orthodox cross was built and consecrated. An Orthodox chapel is also planned to be constructed.

The village hosts the Kilvey festival (meaning "festival of the first calf") during the calving season, when the reindeer are giving birth to their young. Visitors erect yaranga and the traditional Chukchi tambourine, the Yarar is played while the women prepare traditional food. A bonfire is lit, sacrifices are made and a variety of sporting competitions involving jumping, throwing and wrestling take place. The festival ends with a large communal feast.

== Transport ==
Illirney is not yet connected to any other settlement by permanent road, but a new road, the Anadyr Highway, is planned west to Omsukchan and south east to Anadyr.

There is a small series of roads within the settlement including:

- Улица Лесная (Ulitsa Lesnaya, lit. Forest Street)
- Улица Набережная (Ulitsa Naberezhnaya, lit. Quay Street)
- Улица Центральная (Ulitsa Tsentralnaya, lit. Central Street)
- Улица Школьная (Ulitsa Shkolnaya, lit. School Street)

== Climate ==
With a subarctic climate (Köppen Dfc), Ilirney endures bitterly cold weather for much of the year, with temperatures almost never rising above freezing between October and April, and sometimes plummeting below −50 °C or −58 °F in January and February, although the freakish month of January 1950 averaged 19.6 °C (35.3 °F) above the long-term normal owing to a huge block in the Bering Sea that more famously produced a huge cold wave in western Canada and Washington state. Even the short summer period between June and August is cool with temperatures rarely rising above +20 °C (68 °F).

Climate data for Ilirney
Month	Jan	Feb	Mar	Apr	May	Jun	Jul	Aug	Sep	Oct	Nov	Dec	Year
Record high °C (°F)	2.4 (36.3)	1.4 (34.5)	6.5 (43.7)	8.5 (47.3)	21.1 (70.0)	30.7 (87.3)	34.1 (93.4)	31.1 (88.0)	24.1 (75.4)	13.2 (55.8)	2.9 (37.2)	4.2 (39.6)	34.1 (93.4)
Mean daily maximum °C (°F)	−30.4 (−22.7)	−27.3 (−17.1)	−18.6 (−1.5)	−8.4 (16.9)	3.5 (38.3)	16.6 (61.9)	19.3 (66.7)	15.0 (59.0)	6.6 (43.9)	−7.9 (17.8)	−19.5 (−3.1)	−29.1 (−20.4)	−6.7 (19.9)
Daily mean °C (°F)	−34.8 (−30.6)	−32.6 (−26.7)	−25.4 (−13.7)	−15.6 (3.9)	−1.2 (29.8)	11.0 (51.8)	13.5 (56.3)	9.3 (48.7)	1.9 (35.4)	−12.1 (10.2)	−24.1 (−11.4)	−33.4 (−28.1)	−12.0 (10.4)
Mean daily minimum °C (°F)	−39.2 (−38.6)	−37.9 (−36.2)	−32.1 (−25.8)	−23.7 (−10.7)	−6.7 (19.9)	4.8 (40.6)	7.1 (44.8)	3.4 (38.1)	−2.6 (27.3)	−16.4 (2.5)	−29.0 (−20.2)	−37.5 (−35.5)	−17.5 (0.5)
Record low °C (°F)	−64.4 (−83.9)	−62.0 (−79.6)	−55.5 (−67.9)	−46.2 (−51.2)	−35.8 (−32.4)	−8.8 (16.2)	−6.0 (21.2)	−12.0 (10.4)	−27.6 (−17.7)	−41.3 (−42.3)	−55 (−67)	−60.9 (−77.6)	−64.4 (−83.9)
Average precipitation mm (inches)	9 (0.4)	10 (0.4)	10 (0.4)	5 (0.2)	7 (0.3)	14 (0.6)	23 (0.9)	25 (1.0)	15 (0.6)	20 (0.8)	18 (0.7)	11 (0.4)	167 (6.7)
Average precipitation days (≥ 0.1 mm)	12.0	11.0	11.2	8.4	7.9	9.4	10.8	11.0	11.9	16.3	14.2	13.3	137.4
Average relative humidity (%)	70.9	69.9	67.4	64.3	62.7	59.8	65.2	74.7	78.8	82.7	80.3	73.6	70.9
Mean monthly sunshine hours	3.1	70.0	173.6	261.0	266.6	270.0	213.9	167.4	120.0	49.6	15.0	0.0	1,610.2
Source 1: Temperature and precipitation data only
Source 2: climatebase.ru

== See also ==
- List of inhabited localities in Bilibinsky District
