= Vstrechny, Chukotka Autonomous Okrug =

Vstrechny Встречный
- Urban-type settlement (abolished)
- Interactive map of Vstrechny
- Location of Vstrechny Vstrechny (Chukotka Autonomous Okrug)
- Coordinates: 67°57′00″N 165°36′00″E
- Country: Russia
- Federal subject: Chukotka Autonomous Okrug
- Administrative district: Bilibinsky District
- Abolished: 1998

Population
  - Estimate (June 2005): 7 )
- Time zone: UTC+12 (MSK+9)
- Postal code: 689450
- OKTMO ID: 77609701912

Vstrechny (Russian: Встречный) is an inhabited locality (an urban-type settlement) in Bilibinsky District of Chukotka Autonomous Okrug, Russia, located about 25 kilometers (16 mi) ENE of Bilibino. Population: 13 (2002 Census), 1,641 (1989 Soviet census). The 2002, census data shows the population to consist of 12 males and 1 female, though this had fallen to only 7 by 2005, according to an environmental impact report prepared on the Kupol mining project.

== History ==
=== Soviet period ===
The settlement, located on the right hand bank of the Emmynveyem River, was originally created like many throughout this part of Chukotka following the establishment of a mine nearby (Initially called Vstrechny itself) in 1961, to extract gold from the Emmynveyem to house the workers. Two years later however, the mine's name was changed to "45 Years of the Komsomol" (Russian: 45 лет ВЛКСМ). In 1965, the settlement received the status of urban-type settlement.

=== Post-Soviet period ===
When the mines were deemed to be uneconomic, the settlement was abandoned and mostly depopulated by 1996. In 2004, a road was completed linking the settlement with the regional centre, giving hope that the settlement can continue. However, as of 2009, Vstrechny is included in the list of settlements currently in the process of being liquidated.

== Population ==
The mines were declared unprofitable and that there was no possibility of developing any other form of economy in 1999 and the settlement was closed along with a number of others in Chukotka. The Russian government guaranteed funds to transport non-working pensioners and the unemployed in liquidated settlements including Baranikha from Chukotka to other parts of Russia. The Ministry of railways was obliged to lease containers for the transportation of the migrants' goods to the Chukotkan administration and ensure that they were delivered to the various settlements. The population table below shows the impact on the settlement as a result of the closure of the mines.

Demographic Evolution
1970	1979	1989	2002	2005
1819	1572	1641	13	7

== Transport ==
Vstrechny is linked to Bilibino and Keperveyem by a small road network that also links the now abandoned settlements of Bezmyanniy and Karalvaam. There is also a small network of roads within the settlement including:

- Улица Коммунальная (Ulitsa Kommumalnaya, lit. Communal Street)
- Улица Космонавтов (Ulitsa Kosmonavtov, lit. Cosmonaut Street)
- Улица Ленина (Ulitsa Lenina, lit. Lenin Street)
- Улица Мира (Ulitsa Mira, lit. World Street)
- Улица Центральная (Ulitsa Tsentralnaya, lit. Central Street)
- Улица Юбилейная (Ulitsa Yubileinaya, lit. Jubilee Street)

== Climate ==
Vstrechny has a Continental Subarctic or Boreal (taiga) climate (Dfc).

Climate data for Vstrechny
Month	Jan	Feb	Mar	Apr	May	Jun	Jul	Aug	Sep	Oct	Nov	Dec	Year
Record high °C (°F)	0 (32)	3 (37)	1.8 (35.2)	8.3 (46.9)	23.2 (73.8)	32 (90)	35.1 (95.2)	29.9 (85.8)	21 (70)	8 (46)	3.2 (37.8)	1.9 (35.4)	35.1 (95.2)
Mean daily maximum °C (°F)	−27.6 (−17.7)	−26.8 (−16.2)	−17.5 (0.5)	−6.8 (19.8)	5.9 (42.6)	16 (61)	16.8 (62.2)	13.9 (57.0)	5.6 (42.1)	−8 (18)	−22.3 (−8.1)	−27.5 (−17.5)	−7.5 (18.5)
Mean daily minimum °C (°F)	−32.2 (−26.0)	−32.7 (−26.9)	−28.7 (−19.7)	−18.5 (−1.3)	−3.2 (26.2)	5.2 (41.4)	6.7 (44.1)	3.4 (38.1)	−1.8 (28.8)	−14.4 (6.1)	−27.3 (−17.1)	−32.4 (−26.3)	−14.7 (5.5)
Record low °C (°F)	−58 (−72)	−54 (−65)	−50.3 (−58.5)	−44 (−47)	−23.5 (−10.3)	−5.4 (22.3)	−2.3 (27.9)	−8.2 (17.2)	−15 (5)	−37 (−35)	−47 (−53)	−52 (−62)	−58 (−72)
Average rainfall mm (inches)	12 (0.5)	9 (0.4)	3 (0.1)	6 (0.2)	6 (0.2)	18 (0.7)	42 (1.7)	30 (1.2)	21 (0.8)	18 (0.7)	12 (0.5)	18 (0.7)	195 (7.7)
Average snowy days	25	19	14	10	7	1	0	0	9	20	18	21	144

== See also ==
- List of inhabited localities in Bilibinsky District
