= Ilirney Range =

Mountain range in Russia

- Илирнейский кряж
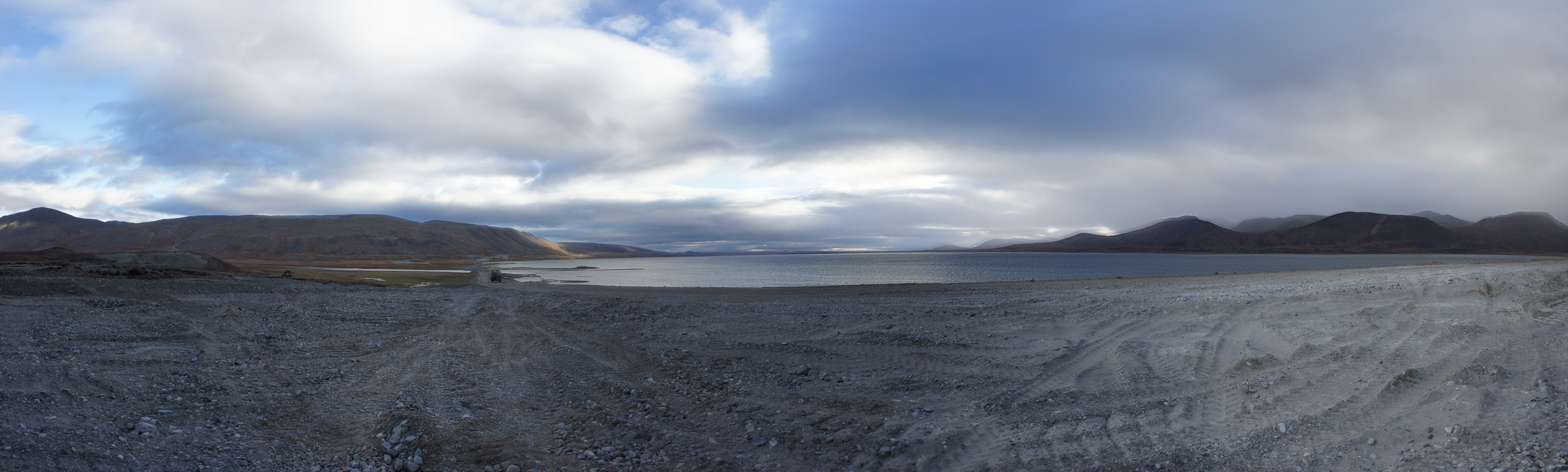
- Landscape of the range rising behind Lake Tytyl.

Highest point
- Peak: Dvukh Tsirkov
- Elevation: 1,785 m (5,856 ft)
- Coordinates: 67°38′N 167°34′E

Dimensions
- Length: 220 km (140 mi) WNW/ESE
- Width: 70 km (43 mi) NNE/SSW

Geography
- Location within Chukotka Autonomous Okrug
- Location: Chukotka Autonomous Okrug, Russian Far East
- Parent range: Anadyr Highlands in East Siberian System

Geology
- Orogeny: Alpine orogeny
- Rock age: Triassic
- Rock type(s): Sandstone, shale and igneous rock intrusions

Climbing
- Easiest route: from Bilibino

The Ilirney Range (Russian: Илирнейский кряж) is a range of mountains in Chukotka Autonomous Okrug, Russian Far East. Administratively the range is part of Bilibino District. The village of Ilirney is located 20 kilometres (12 mi) southwest of the central area of the range. Bilibino is located to the west of the western end.

== Geography ==
The highest point of the Ilirney Range is 1,785 metres (5,856 ft) high mount Dvukh Tsirkov (гора Двух Цирков, meaning "Two Circuses"). Other high peaks of the range are 1,659 metres (5,443 ft) high mount Sypuchiy Kamen (Сыпучий Камень) and 1,459 metres (4,787 ft) high mount Radialnaya (радиальная). To the southeast of the mountain range rises the Anyuy Range, to the west it borders with the Kyrganay and Chuvanay ranges, to the north with the Rauchuan Range and to the east with the Anadyr Plateau. The Ilirney Range is part of the East Siberian System of mountains and is one of the subranges of the Anadyr Highlands.

Two beautiful lakes are located below the southern slopes of the range, Lake Ilirney and Lake Tytyl. The Rauchua River flows across the range and the Maly Anyuy River to the south and southwest. The Nomnunkuveem, one of the river branches that form the Chaun River, flows northwards from the northern slopes. Several smaller rivers have their sources in the range, including the Tytylvaam.

== Flora and climate ==
There are sparse forests of larch in river valleys and the mountain slopes are covered with mountain tundra. The climate of the Ilirney Range is subarctic.

== See also ==
- Chuvanay Range
- Ilirneyite
