= Omolon (rural locality) =

Omolon Омолон
- Selo
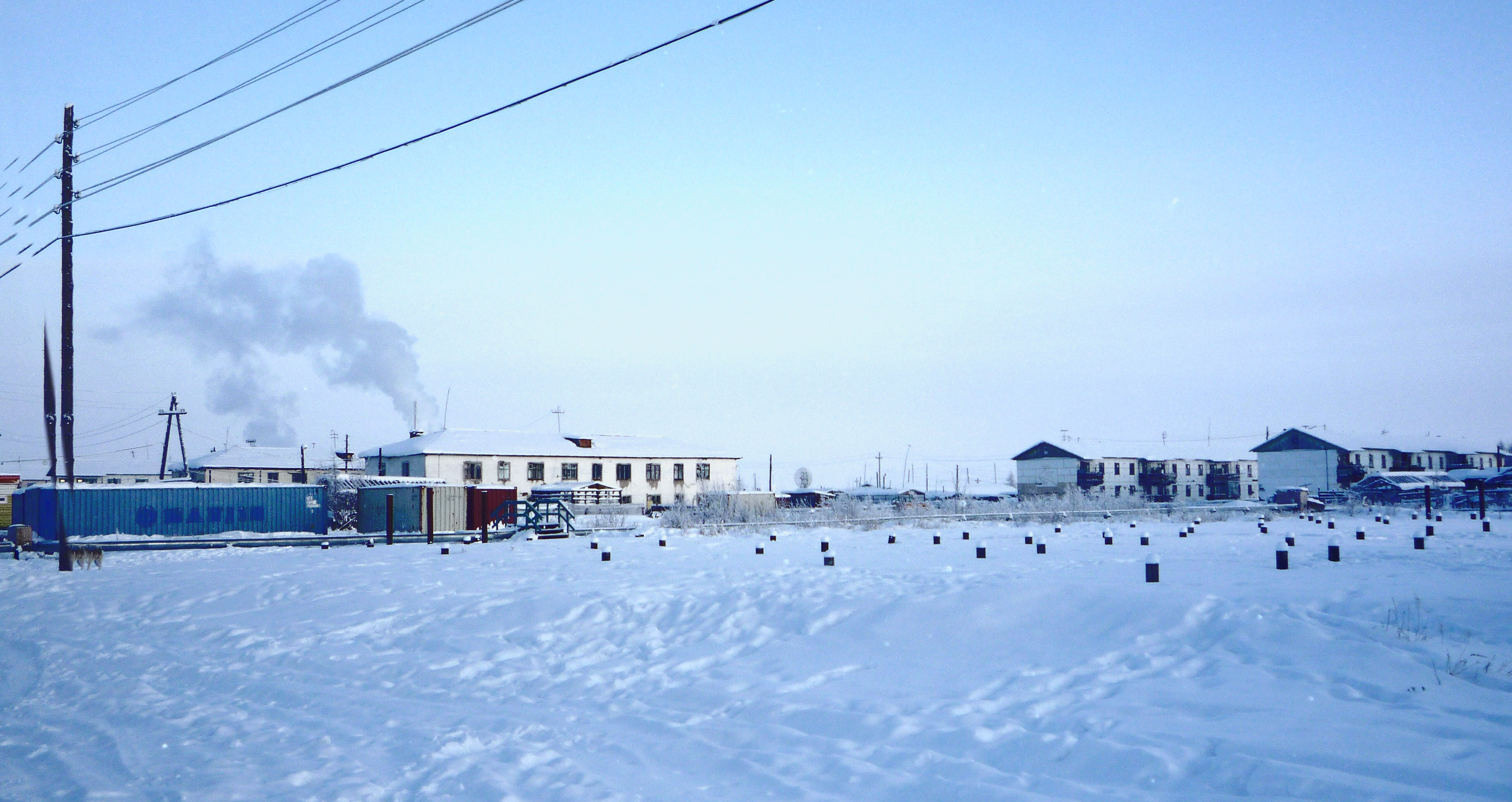
- Winter view of Omolon.
- Interactive map of Omolon
- Location of Omolon Omolon (Chukotka Autonomous Okrug)
- Coordinates: 65°16′N 160°28′E
- Country: Russia
- Federal subject: Chukotka Autonomous Okrug
- Administrative district: Bilibinsky District
- Founded: 1944

Area
  - Total: 2.7 km^{2} (1.0 sq mi)
- Elevation: 265 m (869 ft)

Population (2010 Census)
  - Total: 873
  - Estimate (January 2018): 785 (−10.1%)
  - Density: 320/km^{2} (840/sq mi)

Municipal status
  - Municipal district: Bilibinsky Municipal District
  - Rural settlement: Omolon Rural Settlement
  - Capital of: Omolon Rural Settlement
- Time zone: UTC+12 (MSK+9)
- Postal code: 689470
- Dialing code: +7 42738
- OKTMO ID: 77609430101

Omolon (Russian: Омолон) is a rural locality (a selo) in Bilibinsky District of Chukotka Autonomous Okrug, Russia. It is situated in the far southwest of the district near the border with Magadan Oblast. Population: 873 (2010 census); Municipally, Omolon is subordinated to Bilibinsky Municipal District and is incorporated as Omolon Rural Settlement.

== History ==
Omolon was the headquarters for the sovkhoz (state farm) Omolon until 1992 Prior to 1992, the Sovkhoz had 15 separate herds of reindeer under its control. From 1992 onwards, the Sovkhoz structure was dismantled bit by bit in line with the wider course of Russian privatisation. Previously, the Sovkhoz had been in control of all of the major community services, such as power, education, health and other functions, which were now administered individually at rural settlement or district administrative level. Four of the 15 brigades split from the former Sovkhoz and formed their own private enterprise and those remaining formed a limited liability company called TOO "Omolon"'. This privatisation was not a success. Where previously the Sovkhoz had controlled the settlement's economy and its associated facilities, by 1998 there were nine separate entities involved in the same work and the number of reindeer held by the brigades had fallen from nearly 34,000 to just over 9,000.

== Geography ==
The village, previously called Oloy, Unyagan, and Shcherbakovo before the current name was settled upon in 1960, is the most isolated populated place in Bilibinsky District. Omolon is situated on the right bank of the Omolon River, with the Ush-Urekchen rising to the north. The village is 670 kilometers (420 mi) from Bilibino and 780 kilometers (480 mi) from Anadyr.

== Economy ==
The main occupation of the inhabitants is reindeer herding.

== Demographics ==
The population as of the beginning of January 2012 was 855, mainly Evens, a reduction on the official 2010 census record of 873, of whom 453 were male and 420 female. This represents a fall of around 200 from a 2006 estimate of 1,050 of which around 800 were indigenous peoples. As of January 2012, the ethnic make up of the village was as following:

Demographic Composition - 2012
Indigenous People	Number in Village	Percentage of Population
Even	488	57%
Chukchi	178	21%
Yukagirs	27	3%
Koryaks	11	1%
Yupik	3	<1%
Others	148	17%
Total	855	100%

Note: "Other" includes Russians and Ukrainians amongst others.

Based on a 2006 estimate, the population was 1,050 of which around 800 are indigenous peoples, mainly Evens and Chukchi, up from 936 people as recorded by an environmental impact report prepared in 2005 for the Kupol Gold Project.

The head of the rural settlement is Viktoriya Valbertovna Sirova.

== Transport ==
Omolon is not connected by road to any other inhabited locality. The only means of access to the village is along the Omolon River, which is navigable when not frozen, or by air.

There are plans to build a road, to be known as the Anadyr Highway, from the Kolyma Highway near Magadan to Omolon and further to Anadyr and Bilibino.

=== Air ===
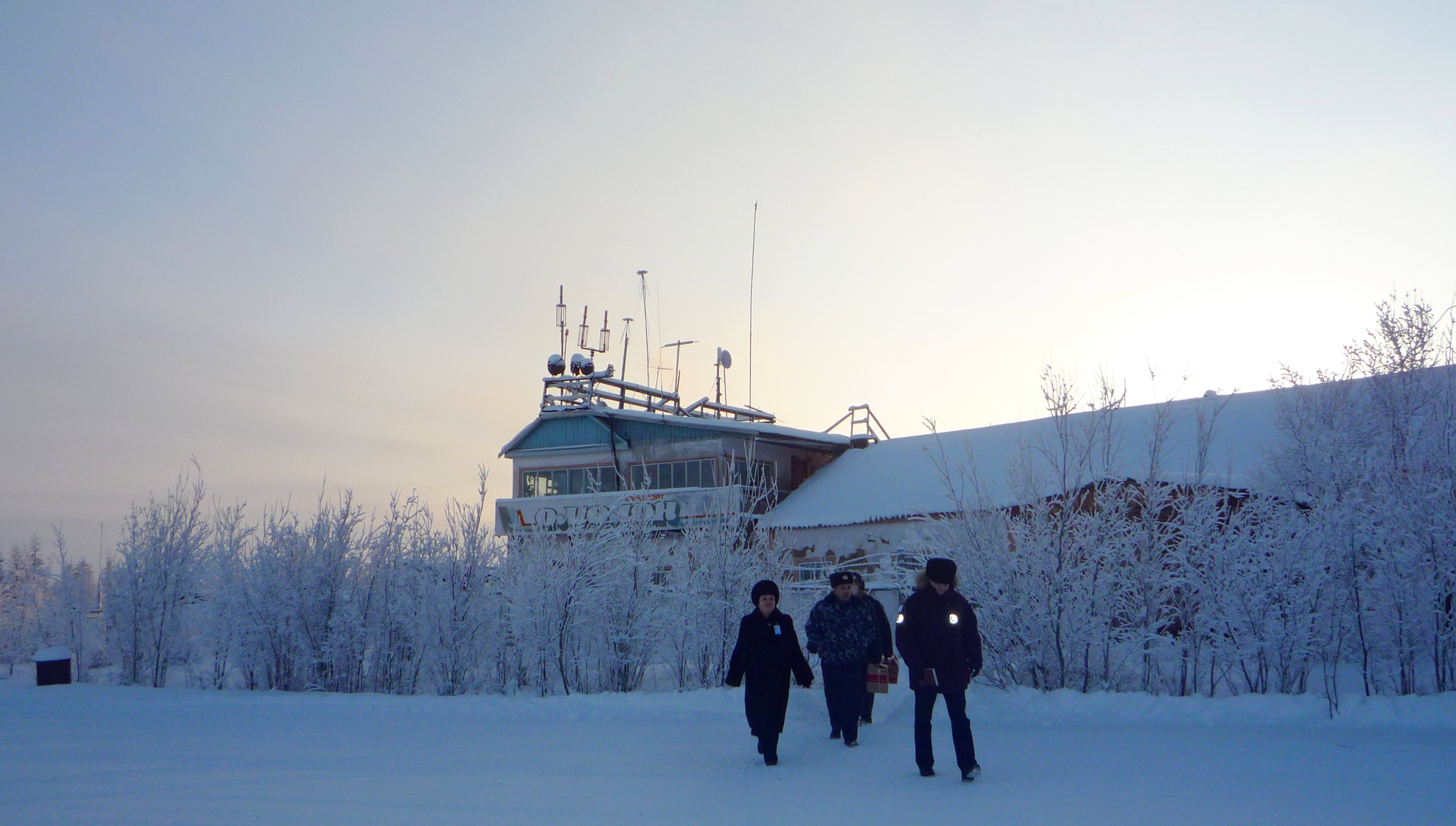
Omolon Airport Terminal

Omolon Airport "Shcherbakhovo" with ICAO code UHMN is located at the edge of the village.

=== Streets ===
There is however a network of streets within the village including:

- Улица Авиаторов (Ulitsa Aviatorov, lit. Aviators' Street)
- Улица Береговая (Ulitsa Beregovaya)
- Улица Заречная (Ulitsa Zarechnaya)
- Улица Клубная (Ulitsa Klubnaya, lit. Club Street)
- Улица Лесная (Ulitsa Lesnaya, lit. Forest Street)
- Улица Парковая (Ulitsa Parkovaya, lit. Park Street)
- Улица Портовая (Ulitsa Portovaya)
- Улица Профсоюзная (Ulitsa Profsoyuznaya, lit. Union Street)
- Улица Советская (Ulitsa Sovetskaya, lit. Soviet Street)
- Улица Сульженко (Ulitsa Sulzhenko)
- Улица Черепова (Ulitsa Cherepova)
- Улица Школьная (Ulitsa Shkolnaya, lit. School Street)
- Улица Южная (Ulitsa Yuzhnaya, lit. South Street)

== Climate ==
Omolon has a subarctic climate (Köppen Dfc/Dfd), with long, very cold winters, and short, cool summers. Average monthly temperatures range from −37.5 °C (−49.7 °F) in January to +14.8 °C (61.70 °F) in July. Mean monthly temperatures are below freezing from October through April and exceed +10 °C (50 °F) from June through August, with the intervening months of May and September constituting very short transitional seasons. The lowest temperature ever recorded in Omolon was −61.1 °C (−77.98 °F) in February 2002, but the highest temperature was 34.0 °C (93.20 °F) in July 2010 and 2022 respectively, yielding a temperature range of 95.1 °C. Temperature in summer months June, July and August, especially in July, often reach 30 °C (86.00 °F) and these are not uncommon occurrences.

Climate data for Omolon
Month	Jan	Feb	Mar	Apr	May	Jun	Jul	Aug	Sep	Oct	Nov	Dec	Year
Record high °C (°F)	3.0 (37.4)	3.6 (38.5)	4.0 (39.2)	9.7 (49.5)	25.5 (77.9)	31.9 (89.4)	34.0 (93.2)	31.2 (88.2)	25.3 (77.5)	15.0 (59.0)	4.4 (39.9)	3.8 (38.8)	34.0 (93.2)
Mean daily maximum °C (°F)	−32.8 (−27.0)	−29.0 (−20.2)	−16.6 (2.1)	−4.8 (23.4)	8.0 (46.4)	18.6 (65.5)	21.4 (70.5)	16.9 (62.4)	8.7 (47.7)	−5.1 (22.8)	−19.9 (−3.8)	−31.1 (−24.0)	−5.5 (22.2)
Daily mean °C (°F)	−37.0 (−34.6)	−34.2 (−29.6)	−24.0 (−11.2)	−11.9 (10.6)	3.0 (37.4)	12.5 (54.5)	15.1 (59.2)	10.7 (51.3)	3.6 (38.5)	−9.4 (15.1)	−24.1 (−11.4)	−34.9 (−30.8)	−10.9 (12.4)
Mean daily minimum °C (°F)	−41.0 (−41.8)	−39.1 (−38.4)	−31.2 (−24.2)	−20.2 (−4.4)	−2.7 (27.1)	5.7 (42.3)	8.4 (47.1)	4.7 (40.5)	−1.2 (29.8)	−13.6 (7.5)	−28.4 (−19.1)	−38.7 (−37.7)	−16.4 (2.4)
Record low °C (°F)	−60.9 (−77.6)	−61.1 (−78.0)	−57.2 (−71.0)	−48.4 (−55.1)	−30.2 (−22.4)	−5.1 (22.8)	−3.5 (25.7)	−9.3 (15.3)	−20.7 (−5.3)	−37.7 (−35.9)	−54.1 (−65.4)	−59.9 (−75.8)	−61.1 (−78.0)
Average precipitation mm (inches)	11.0 (0.43)	9.2 (0.36)	9.9 (0.39)	5.6 (0.22)	12.4 (0.49)	29.8 (1.17)	54.9 (2.16)	48.4 (1.91)	30.7 (1.21)	20.2 (0.80)	23.7 (0.93)	13.8 (0.54)	269.6 (10.61)
Average rainy days	0	0	0	0.1	4	10	12	13	8	0.3	0	0	47.4
Average snowy days	15	14	13	9	4	0.4	0	0.1	4	18	16	17	110.5
Average relative humidity (%)	74	73	70	67	61	61	67	74	76	79	78	75	71
Source: Pogoda.ru.net

== See also ==
- List of inhabited localities in Bilibinsky District

== Sources ==
- Bema Gold Corporation, Environmental Impact Assessment, Kupol Gold Project, Far East Russia June 2005.
- W. K. Dallmann. Indigenous Peoples of the north of the Russian Federation, Map 3.6, Chukotskiy Avtonomyy Okrug. 1997.
- Дума Чукотского автономного округа. Закон №33-ОЗ от 30 июня 1998 г. «Об административно-территориальном устройстве Чукотского автономного округа», в ред. Закона №55-ОЗ от 9 июня 2012 г. «О внесении изменений в Закон Чукотского автономного округа "Об административно-территориальном устройстве Чукотского автономного округа"». Вступил в силу по истечении десяти дней со дня его официального опубликования. Опубликован: "Ведомости", №7 (28), 14 мая 1999 г. (Duma of Chukotka Autonomous Okrug. Law #33-OZ of June 30, 1998 On the Administrative-Territorial Structure of Chukotka Autonomous Okrug, as amended by the Law #55-OZ of June 9, 2012 On Amending the Law of Chukotka Autonomous Okrug "On the Administrative-Territorial Structure of Chukotka Autonomous Okrug". Effective as of after ten days from the day of the official publication.).
- Дума Чукотского автономного округа. Закон №43-ОЗ от 29 ноября 2004 г. «О статусе, границах и административных центрах муниципальных образований на территории Билибинского района Чукотского автономного округа», в ред. Закона №88-ОЗ от 20 октября 2010 г «О преобразовании путём объединения поселений на территории Билибинского муниципального района и внесении изменений в Закон Чукотского автономного округа "О статусе, границах и административных центрах муниципальных образований на территории Билибинского района Чукотского автономного округа"». Вступил в силу через десять дней со дня официального опубликования. Опубликован: "Ведомости", №31/1 (178/1), 10 декабря 2004 г. (Duma of Chukotka Autonomous Okrug. Law #43-OZ of November 29, 2004 On the Status, Borders, and Administrative Centers of the Municipal Formations on the Territory of Bilibinsky District of Chukotka Autonomous Okrug, as amended by the Law #88-OZ of October 20, 2010 On the Transformation (Merger) of the Settlements on the Territory of Bilibinsky Municipal District and Amending the Law of Chukotka Autonomous Okrug "On the Status, Borders, and Administrative Centers of the Municipal Formations on the Territory of Bilibinsky District of Chukotka Autonomous Okrug". Effective as of the day ten days after the official publication date.).
- M Strogoff, P-C Brochet, and D. Auzias Petit Futé: Chukotka (2006). "Avant-Garde" Publishing House.
