= Ilirney (lake) =

Group of two lakes in Russia

- Илирней (Russian); Элер-нэй (Chukot)
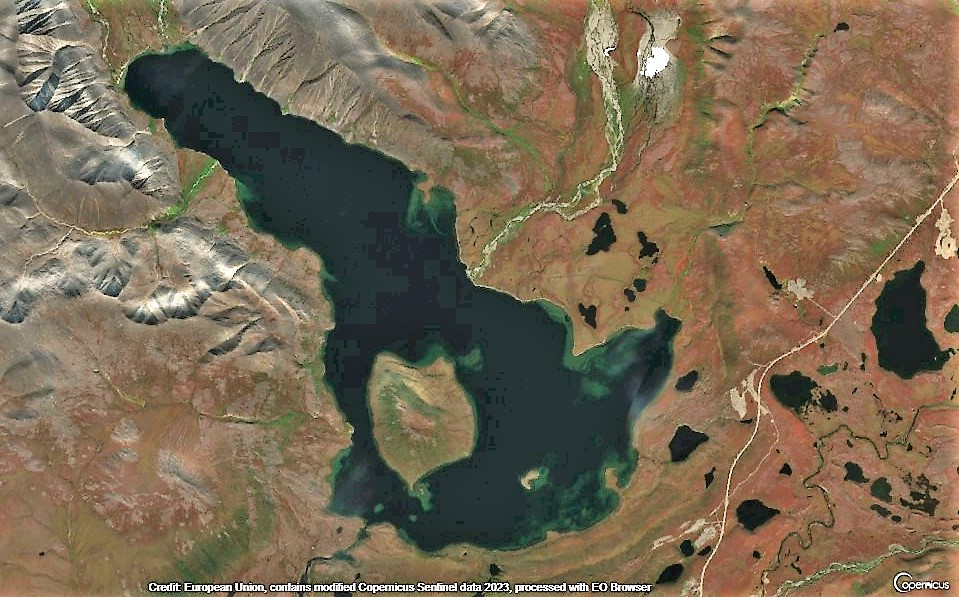
- Ilirney. Northern lake Sentinel-2 image.

- Location Ilirney (Russia)

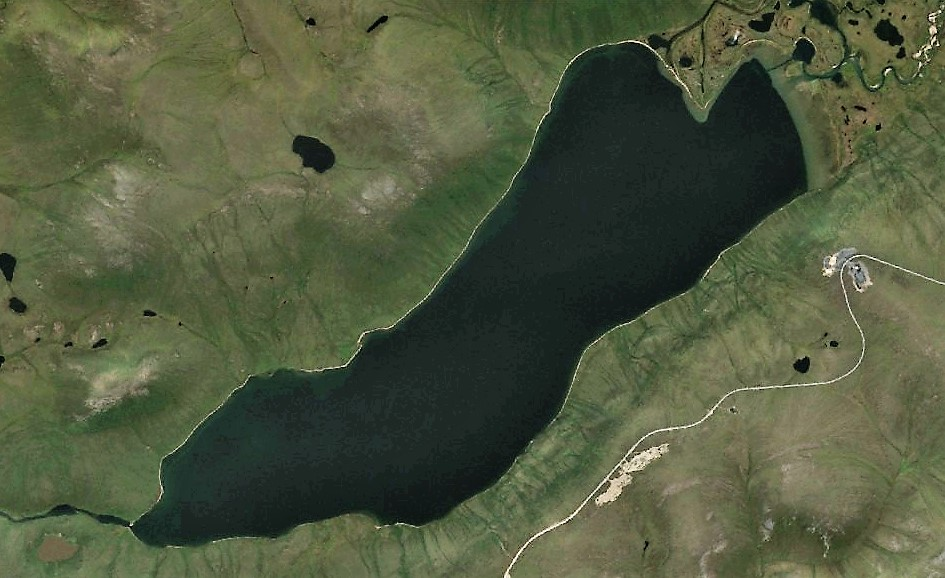
- Ilirney. Southern lake Sentinel-2 image.
- Location: Bilibinsky District, Chukotka Autonomous Okrug
- Coordinates: 67°27′N 168°33′E
- Etymology: rocky island
- Primary inflows: Ilirneyveyem
- Primary outflows: Ilirneyveyem
- Basin countries: Chukotka, Russia
- Max. length: 9.4 km (5.8 mi)
- Max. width: 3.1 km (1.9 mi)
- Surface area: 28.2 km^{2} (10.9 sq mi)
- Surface elevation: 421 m (1,381 ft)
- Islands: One (northern lake)

Ilirney (Chukchi Элер-нэй) is a group of two lakes in Bilibinsky District, Chukotka Autonomous Okrug, Russia.

Archaeological remains of the Neolithic have been found on the shores of the lake.

== Etymology ==
The name originated in the Chukchi word Eler-nei, meaning "rocky island", after the island located in the middle of the northern lake (Verkhniy Ilirneygytgyn).

== Geography ==
The lakes are located on the southern side of the Ilirney Range in the upper reaches of the Maly Anyuy River, 20 km from Ilirney town. Dvukh Tsirkov, the highest peak of the range rises to the north of the lake. River Ilirneyveyem flows to the east of it.

Southern Ilirney (Nizhniy Ilirneygytgyn) is a slightly larger lake located 8.5 km to the southwest of the northern lake. River Ilirneyveyem flows in and out of Southern Ilirney. Lake Tytyl lies 33 km to the east.

== See also ==
- List of lakes of Russia
