= Omolon Airport =

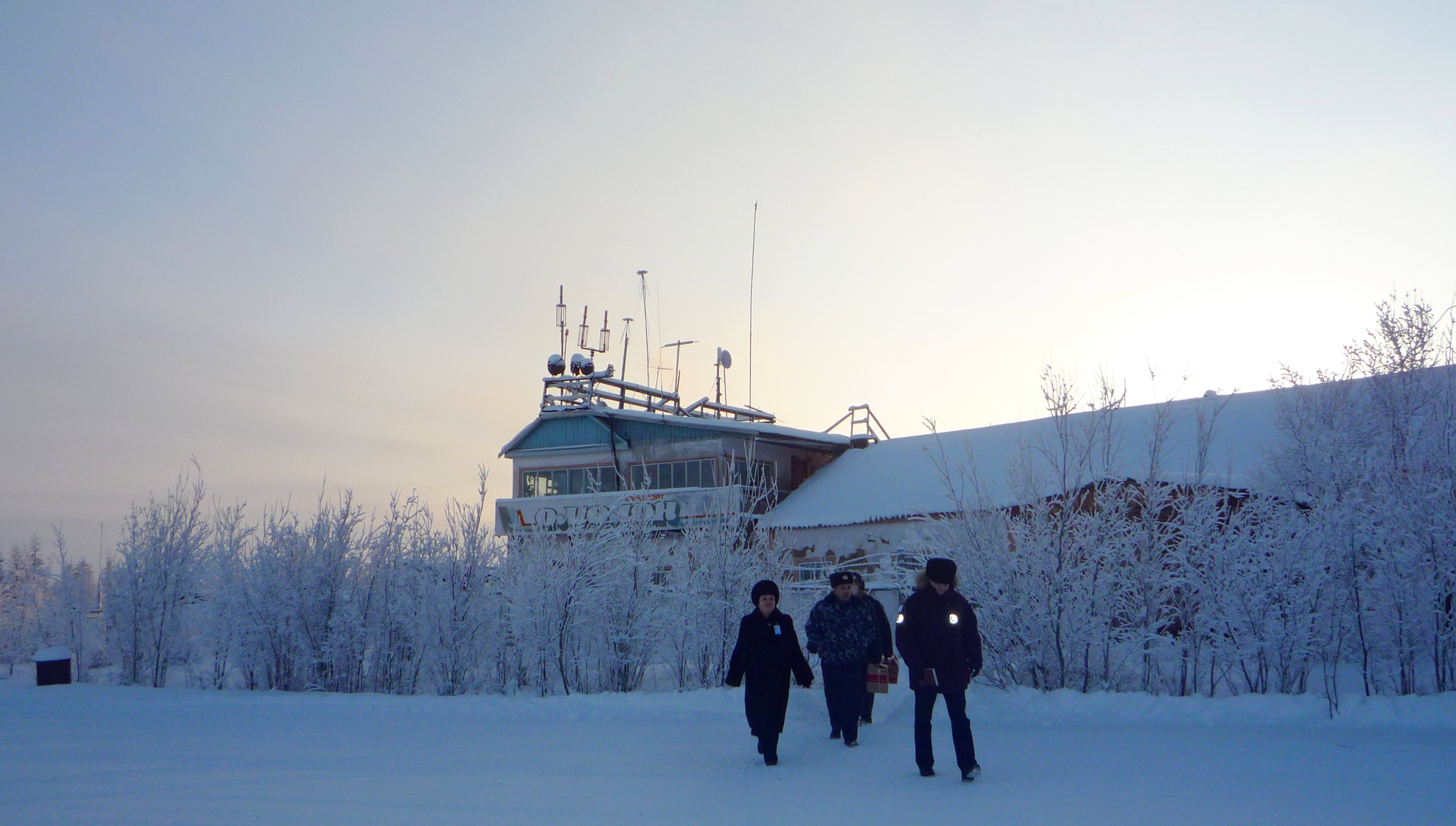
- Omolon Airport
- IATA: none; ICAO: UHMN; LID: ООЛ

Summary
- Airport type: Public
- Location: Omolon
- Elevation AMSL: 265 m / 869 ft
- Coordinates: 65°14′30″N 160°32′21″E

Maps
- Chukotka Autonomous Okrug in Russia

- Location of the airport in the Chukotka district

Runways
Direction	Length		Surface
Direction	m	ft	Surface
09/27	1,405	4,610

Omolon Airport (ICAO: UHMN) is a minor airport built 1 km north of Omolon in Chukotka Autonomous Okrug, Russia.

== Airlines and destinations ==
Airlines	Destinations
Chukotavia	Keperveyem
IrAero	Magadan
SiLA Airlines	Magadan

== See also ==
- List of airports in Russia
