= Dalny, Belgorod Oblast =

Dalny Дальний
- Settlement
- Location within Belgorod Oblast Location within Russia
- Coordinates: 49°56′N 38°06′E
- Country: Russia
- Region: Belgorod Oblast
- District: Valuysky District
- Time zone: UTC+3:00

Dalny (Russian: Дальний) is a rural locality (a settlement) in Valuysky District, Belgorod Oblast, Russia. The population was 434 as of 2010. There are 11 streets.

== Geography ==
Dalny is located 34 km south of Valuyki (the district's administrative centre) by road.
