= Dalny, Volgograd Oblast =

Dalny Дальний
- Settlement
- Location within Volgograd Oblast Location within Russia
- Coordinates: 48°16′N 43°23′E
- Country: Russia
- Region: Volgograd Oblast
- District: Kalachyovsky District
- Time zone: UTC+4:00

Dalny (Russian: Дальний) is a rural locality (a settlement) in Logoskoye Rural Settlement, Kalachyovsky District, Volgograd Oblast, Russia. The population was 156 as of 2010. There are 4 streets.

== Geography ==
Dalny is located 93 km southwest of Kalach-na-Donu (the district's administrative centre) by road. Shebalino is the nearest rural locality.
