= Dalneye, Astrakhan Oblast =

Dalneye Дальнее
- Selo
- Location within Astrakhan Oblast Location within Russia
- Coordinates: 45°42′N 47°24′E
- Country: Russia
- Region: Astrakhan Oblast
- District: Limansky District
- Time zone: UTC+4:00

Dalneye (Russian: Дальнее) is a rural locality (a selo) in Budarinsky Selsoviet, Limansky District, Astrakhan Oblast, Russia. The population was 78 as of 2010. There is 1 street.

== Geography ==
Dalneye is located 24 km southeast of Liman (the district's administrative centre) by road. Budarino is the nearest rural locality.
