= Dalny, Rubtsovsky District, Altai Krai =

Dalny Дальний
- Settlement
- Location within Altai Krai Location within Russia
- Coordinates: 51°28′N 81°41′E
- Country: Russia
- Region: Altai Krai
- District: Rubtsovsky District
- Time zone: UTC+7:00

Dalny (Russian: Дальний) is a rural locality (a settlement) and the administrative center of Dalny Selsoviet, Rubtsovsky District, Altai Krai, Russia. The population was 649 as of 2013. There are 12 streets.

== Geography ==
Dalny is located 43 km east of Rubtsovsk (the district's administrative centre) by road. Troinka is the nearest rural locality.
