= Northern delivery =

Annual delivery to northern Russia

The Northern delivery (Russian: северный завоз, romanized: severny zavoz) is a set of annual measures to provide the population of the Russian Far North with basic goods (primarily food and fuel) for long and harsh polar winter.

Northern delivery as a phenomenon is due to three reasons:

- Absence of its own production base for most industrial and agricultural products in the Far North
- Remoteness of the main industrial areas by thousands of kilometers, which makes it difficult and expensive for private entities to deliver goods even in the summer
- Complete absence of roads and railways in most regions of the Far North.

In these conditions, the only possible is the centralized purchase and transportation of goods from the southern and central Russia to the Far North, which is a responsibility of the federal government. Delivery is carried out mainly by air, as well as river and sea, including the Northern Sea Route.

Today, 70% of cargo delivered by the program is fuel. Northern delivery is carried out in 25 regions of Russia. The main volume of supplies falls on four regions: Yakutia, Chukotka, Magadan Oblast and north of Krasnoyarsk Krai with a total population of about three million inhabitants.
