= Dalny, Republic of Bashkortostan =

Dalny Дальний
- Khutor
- Location within Bashkortostan Location within Russia
- Coordinates: 54°27′N 54°58′E
- Country: Russia
- Region: Bashkortostan
- District: Chishminsky District
- Time zone: UTC+5:00

Dalny (Russian: Дальний; Bashkir: Арғы, Arğı) is a rural locality (a khutor) in Shingak-Kulsky Selsoviet, Chishminsky District, Bashkortostan, Russia. The village has 3 streets and, as of 2010, a population of 48.

== Geography ==
Dalny is located 46 km southwest of Chishmy, the district's administrative centre. Verkhny is the nearest rural locality.
