= Areal (company) =

Gold mining company

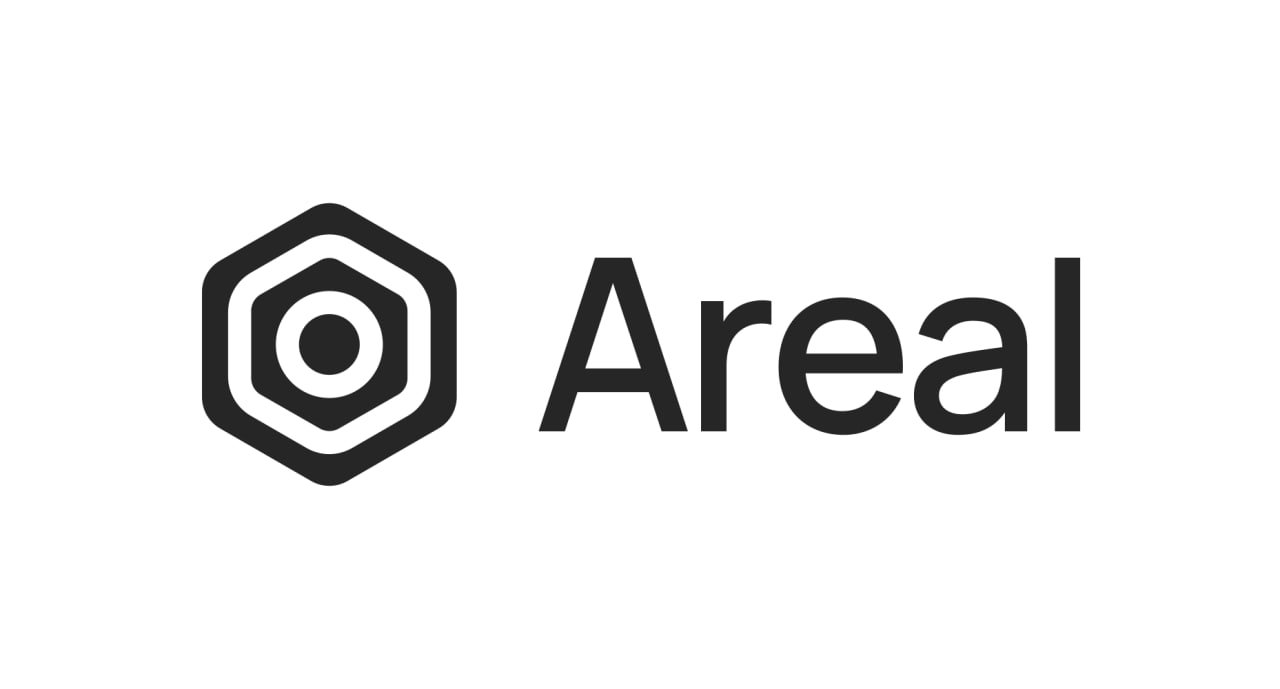
- Industry: Metals and mining
- Founded: 2002; 24 years ago
- Headquarters: Russia
- Key people: Vladislav Sviblov
- Revenue: US$500,4 million (Fiscal Year Ended December 31, 2021)
- Net income: US$171,2 million (Fiscal Year Ended December 31, 2021)

Areal (until 2025 - Highland Gold Mining Limited, HGML) is a Russian mining and metallurgical holding company that develops precious and base metal deposits in Siberia, the Far East, and the Arctic, as well as developing projects for the extraction and processing of a number of minor, scarce metals. It is one of the ten largest gold miners in Russia, with facilities and service divisions located in 11 regions of the country. Its main production centers are located in the Transbaikalia, Kamchatka, and Khabarovsk Krais, Buryatia, and the Chukotka Autonomous Okrug.

== History ==
Highland Gold Mining Limited was incorporated in 2002.

In 2003 Barrick Gold Corp, the world's largest gold producer, began to invest in HGML, gradually increasing its share to 34 %. Later, Barrick Gold sold its stake, explaining that it was «non-core to Barrick's business operations and strategy».

In 2007 more than 40 % of HGML were acquired by Millhouse LLC investment company owned by Roman Abramovich. In July 2020 the purchase of 40,06 % of HGML shares from Abramovich and his business associates was announced by an entity controlled by Vladislav Sviblov. By the end of 2020 Sviblov had bought out 100 % of HGML.

In 2021 Highland Gold acquired the largest gold producer in Kamchatka — «Gold of Kamchatka» along with Trans-Siberian Gold. By the end of 2021 the company completed the acquisition of the Kamchatka and Transbaikalia assets.

== Management ==
Vladislav Sviblov has been CEO of Highland Gold since December 2020 (previously this position was held by Denis Alexandrov, Henry Horn, Dmitry Korobov).

== Operations ==
The company is focused on gold, silver and non-ferrous metals' mining. As of the beginning of 2022 HGML owns 11 operating mines in Transbaikalia, Khabarovsk, Kamchatka and Chukotka as well as 8 development projects and many exploration projects in these regions.
