= Bilibinsky District =

Bilibinsky District Билибинский район (Russian)
- District
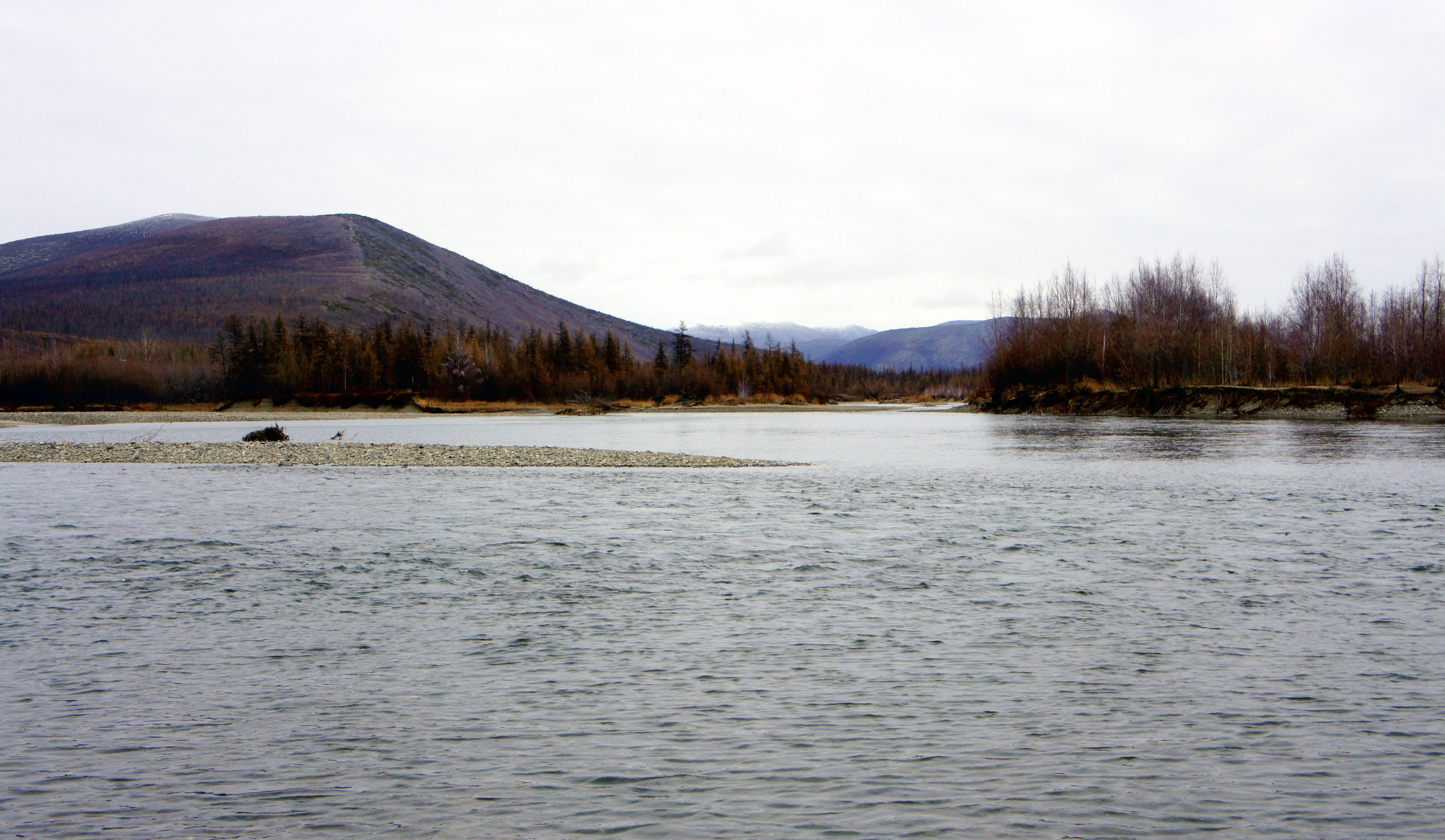
- The Maly Anyuy River in Bilibinsky District

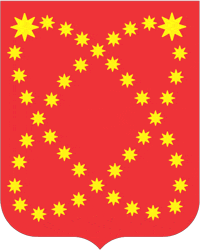
- Coat of arms
- Location of Bilibinsky District in Chukotka Autonomous Okrug
- Coordinates: 68°03′N 166°27′E
- Country: Russia
- Federal subject: Chukotka Autonomous Okrug
- Established: December 10, 1930
- Administrative center: Bilibino

Government
  - Type: Local government
  - Head of the Administration: Leonid Nikolayev

Area
  - Total: 174,652 km^{2} (67,434 sq mi)

Population (2010 Census)
  - Total: 7,866
  - Estimate (January 2016): 7,609
  - Density: 0.04504/km^{2} (0.1166/sq mi)
  - Urban: 70.0%
  - Rural: 30.0%

Administrative structure
  - Inhabited localities: 1 cities/towns, 4 urban-type settlements, 5 rural localities

Municipal structure
  - Municipally incorporated as: Bilibinsky Municipal District
  - Municipal divisions: 1 urban settlements, 4 rural settlements
- Time zone: UTC+12 (MSK+9)
- OKTMO ID: 77609000
- Website: http://www.bilchao.ru/

Bilibinsky District (Russian: Били́бинский райо́н; Chukot: Билибинкэн район, Bilibinkèn rajon) is an administrative and municipal district (raion), one of the six in Chukotka Autonomous Okrug, Russia. It is located in the west of the autonomous okrug and borders with Chaunsky District in the northeast, Anadyrsky District in the east, Koryak Okrug of Kamchatka Krai in the southeast, Magadan Oblast in the southwest, and the Sakha Republic in the west. The area of the district is 174,652 square kilometers (67,434 sq mi). Its administrative center is the town of Bilibino. Population: 7,418 (2021 census); 7,866 (2010 census); 8,820 (2002 census); 27,847 (1989 Soviet census). The population of Bilibino accounts for 74.8% of the district's total population.

Archeological finds indicate that the territory of what is now Bilibinsky District was first inhabited in the early Neolithic. Following the establishment of Anadyrsk by Semyon Dezhnyov in the 17th century, the Bolshoy Anyuy River, which flows through the modern district, was an important link between the Cossack explorers and their base in Nizhnekolymsk and facilitated interactions between the Cossacks and the indigenous people. Gold and other minerals were discovered in the 20th century, and in the 1970s the world's smallest and most northerly nuclear power station was built in Bilibino.

== Geography ==
Bilibinsky and Anadyrsky Districts cover most of the interior of the autonomous okrug, with Bilibinsky District forming its western quarter. Bilibinsky District is the only district in Chukotka not to have a port, even though it has a coastline on the East Siberian Sea.

The size of the district means that there is a range of different landscapes as the territory lies in the Anadyr Highlands, a transition zone between the Chukotka Mountains and the Kolyma Highlands. The district is mountainous with mountain ranges such as the Pyrkanay Range, Rauchuan Range, Kyrganay Range, Chuvan Mountains, Ilirney Range and Anyuy Range, covering substantial parts of it. It is also home to the Anyuyskiy crater, an indication of recent volcanic activity in Chukotka. The main rivers are the Bolshoy Anyuy River and the Maly Anyuy River.

== History ==
=== Prehistory ===
As with Anadyrsky District, the earliest human remains found have been dated to the early Neolithic, with camp sites having been excavated at Orlovka 2—ya site on the banks of the Orlovka River—as well as at Lake Tytyl and Lake Ilirney.

=== 17th–18th centuries ===
Cossacks first became aware of an indigenous people living on the territory of present-day Bilibinsky District after encountering trouble with a group of Chukchi from the area when on the Alazeya River near the modern border with the Sakha Republic in the 1640s.

Following the establishment of Anadyrsk by Semyon Dezhnyov, the Bolshoy Anyuy River became the main thoroughfare linking the new ostrog (fortress) with the fort at Nizhnekolymsk, with the region being the first place in Chukotka where native people met with Russians. In 1788, the first trade fair was held on the banks of the Bolshoy Anyuy between Russians and Chukchi, a vital step in encouraging trade and peaceful relations between the two peoples. Once this route became regularly used, further discoveries were made of additional indigenous peoples inhabiting the area, including the Yukaghirs living along the banks of the Bolshoy Anyuy and Maly Anyuy Rivers, as well as Chuvans, who lived further upstream. Throughout the remainder of the 17th century and the beginning of the 18th, Yukaghirs served as guides to the Cossacks exploring this new land.

By the mid-18th century, there was considerable trade between the local Chukchi people and the Russians, and by 1788 it reached such a high level that the first official trade fair between the two peoples and the Chuvans was held on the banks of the Bolshoy Anyuy. This became an annual fair with the Russians trading tobacco and metal items with the indigenous peoples for skins and furs.

=== 20th century ===
In December 1930, the Chukotka National Okrug was established, consisting of Anadyrsky, Chukotsky, Markovsky, Chaunsky, Vostochnoy Tundry (later renamed Bilibinsky) and Zapadnoy Tundry Districts. Ostrovnoye became the first administrative center of the Vostochnoy Tundry District, with authority over six separate selsoviets (Bolshe-Enyuysky, Malo-Enyuysky, Oloysky, Oloychansky, Ostrovnovsky, and Pogyndinsky. Ostrovnoye remained the administrative center of the district for the next twenty years until March 15, 1950, when the administrative center was transferred to Anyuysk.

It was not until the 20th century that with the discovery of gold in the area mineral exploration began to take place, and it was during this time that the district began to resemble its current state. Although substantial deposits of gold had been found, the outbreak of World War II prevented any follow-up until the mid-1950s. In March 1955, the first gold deposits were found and construction of a village in the vicinity named Karalvaam began. In 1956, Karalvaam was renamed Bilibino after the discoverer of these deposits, Yury Bilibin.

Further deposits of gold were found along the Maly Anyuy and other minerals were found throughout the district as well, accelerating the development of the regional economy. This resulted in the construction of a diesel power station in Bilibino in 1959, which was converted to nuclear power in 1973.

In September 1968, a decision was made in Magadan (for at that time Chukotka was part of a large Magadan Oblast) to grant Bilibino town status and in August 1961, the administrative center of the district was moved once more; this time to Bilibino, where it remains to this day.

Despite the mineral riches present in Bilibinsky District, sufficient quantities are not being generated to make for meaningful export along the Northern Sea Route.

== Administrative and municipal status ==
Within the framework of administrative divisions, Bilibinsky District is one of the six in the autonomous okrug. The town of Bilibino serves as its administrative center. The district does not have any lower-level administrative divisions and has administrative jurisdiction over one town, four urban-type settlements, and five rural localities.

As a municipal division, the district is incorporated as Bilibinsky Municipal District and is divided into one urban settlement and four rural settlements.

=== Inhabited localities ===
Municipal composition
Urban settlements	Population	Male	Female	Inhabited localities in jurisdiction
Bilibino (Билибино)	5842	2894 (49.5%)	2948 (50.5%)	town of Bilibino (administrative center of the district); selo of Keperveyem
Rural settlements	Population	Male	Female	Rural localities in jurisdiction*
Anyuysk (Анюйск)	480	240 (50.0%)	240 (50.0%)	**selo of Anyuysk**
Ilirney (Илирней)	287	152 (53.0%)	135 (47.0%)	**selo of Ilirney**
Omolon (Омолон)	873	453 (51.9%)	420 (48.1%)	**selo of Omolon**
Ostrovnoye (Островное)	384	183 (47.7%)	201 (52.3%)	**selo of Ostrovnoye**
Inhabited localities being liquidated
urban-type settlement of Aliskerovo; urban-type settlement of Dalny; urban-type settlement of Vesenny; urban-type settlement of Vstrechny

Division source:
Population source:
*Administrative centers are shown in bold

== Demographics ==
Apart from ethnic Russians, a number of different indigenous peoples live in the district. The most represented indigenous people are the Chukchi, who are present in the northern parts of the district, and the Evens, who are the majority indigenous group in the south. There are also small populations of Yukaghirs and Yakuts, given the district's proximity to the Sakha Republic.

As with most of the districts in Chukotka, indigenous peoples are more often found in the scattered rural localities, while ethnic Russians are more often found in the urban areas. These people either migrated to the Far East, or are the descendants of those who did, enticed by the higher pay, large pensions, and more generous allowances permitted to those prepared to endure the cold and the isolation, as well as those who were exiled here as a result of Stalin's purges or after having been released from the Gulag. The existence of the nuclear power plant in the district is a major reason for the presence of ethnic Russians, and they make up almost the entirety of the approximate 6,000 people who live in Bilibino, with only around 280 residents being of indigenous origin in 2006, down from 337 in 2004. According to an environmental impact report produced by Bema Gold for the Kupol gold project in 2005, there were 2,242 indigenous people living in the district at the start of 2004. Of these people, 920 were Even, 897 were Chukchi, with the remainder comprising Yukaghir, Nenets, Koryak, Evenk, and Yupik peoples. There were approximately the following numbers of indigenous people at the start of 2004 in Bilibinsky Municipal District:

- Ostrovnoye: 331 (93%)
- Ilirney: 233 (77%)
- Anyuysk: 334 (62%)
- Keperveyem: 219 (48%)
- Bilibino: 337 (5%)

== Economy ==
=== Industrial and administrative ===
The economy of Bilibinsky District has suffered considerably since the dissolution of the Soviet Union, with the population of the district more than halving in the years between 1996 and 2005. In 2005, there were approximately 1,500 people officially employed in the district and less than 200 people officially unemployed. The average wage in 2002 across all sectors was nearly 11,500 rubles per month, approximately 10% higher than those employed in the transportation and fuel sectors in Anadyrsky District, the best paid sectors in that district, mainly due to those employed in the nuclear power station.

The administrative center of the district is the town Bilibino, which is home to the world's most northerly nuclear power station, which contains four reactors and is the only nuclear power plant in the Russian Far East. It is also the world's smallest nuclear power plant.

=== Traditional and cultural ===
Despite its size, in terms of the percentage of the population the district has only around half the number of indigenous peoples than much smaller districts, such as Beringovsky District, with only around 20% of the total population coming from indigenous peoples, mainly Evenks and Yukaghir. These people are engaged like many across the autonomous okrug in traditional reindeer herding, with a deliberate focus being placed by the district administration on creating outlets, through which the products of this herding may be sold.

By 2005, there had been a significant reduction in the agricultural output of the district, with milk and egg production ceasing entirely and meat production reduced by two-thirds.

=== Transportation ===
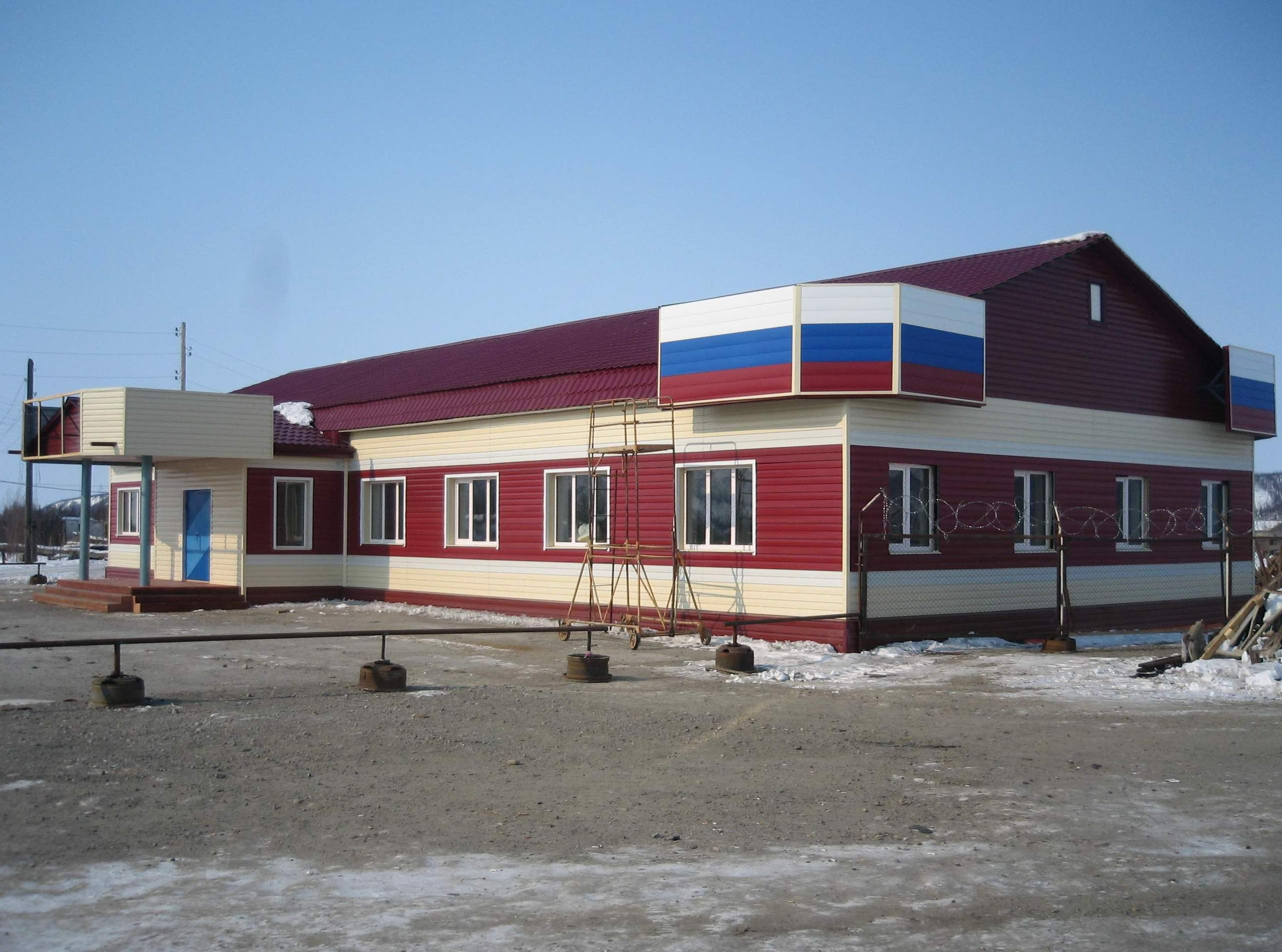
Keperveyem Airport terminal which serves Bilibino

Transportation within the district is an issue, with there being very little in the way of all-weather paved surfaces. Instead most of the roads are winter-only ice roads, so the district is heavily reliant on air travel to move goods and people. Aside from an undeveloped road network, Bilibinsky District is the only district in the autonomous okrug that does not have a significant port. Instead it must rely on other ports, with Pevek being the closest sizable harbor, as a delivery point for all imports that arrive by sea. The only year-round road is the one that links Bilibino with Keperveyem. Road access to all other settlements in the district is only possible along winter roads.
