= Kupol Gold Mine =

Mine in Chukotka Autonomous Okrug, Russia

Kupol
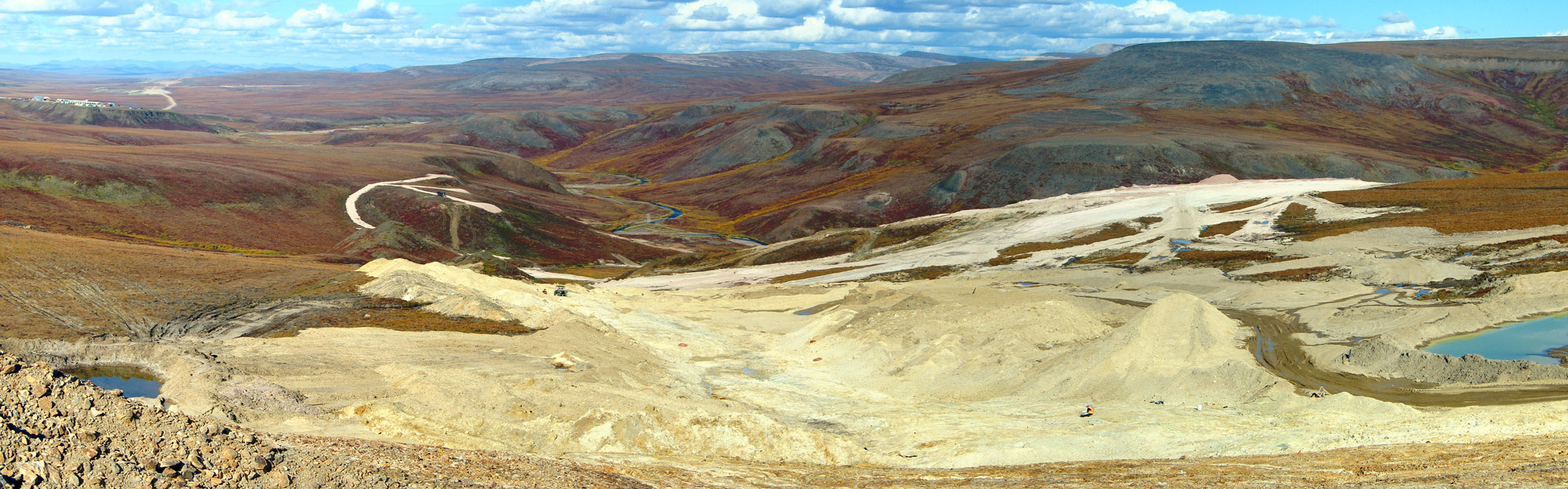
- Northern view of the Kupol Gold Mine

- Location of Kupol Knox Gold Mine
- Location: Bilibinsky District, Chukotka Autonomous Okrug, Russia; 66°47′0″N 169°33′0″E
- Production: 554,008
- Financial year: 2010
- Active: 2007–present
- Company: Highland Gold
- Acquired: 2022

Kupol Gold Mine is a combination underground and open pit gold and silver mine located in the Bilibinsky District of the Chukotka Autonomous Okrug of Russia, at the eastern end of the Anyuy Range. The mine, which produces gold and silver doré bars, is 100% owned by Russian based Highland Gold. The name Kupol (Russian: купол), literally means "dome".

== History ==
Development of the mine began in 2005 on a property owned by the Bema Gold Corporation. Bema Gold financed construction through a series of loans totaling $425 million. Bayerische Hypo und Vereinsbank and Société Générale provided $250 million, and $150 million was provided by an international consortium made up of Caterpillar, Export Development Canada, International Finance Corporation, and others. Bema Gold's corporate office loaned the remaining $25 million. In addition to the loans, the government of Chukotka Autonomous Okrug provided an additional $18 million to support construction. In 2007, Kinross Gold purchased a 75% stake in the mine with its acquisition of Bema Gold; the remaining 25% ownership came in 2011 through a purchase of one of Kinross' subsidiary companies. The mine began producing its first gold ore in 2008. Following the Russian invasion of Ukraine, and western sanctions imposed on Russia, Canadian based Kinross Gold divested of all assets in Russia including the Kupol Mine, selling the Kupol mine to Russian company Highland Gold for US$340M in June of 2022, half of the previously agreed upon price.

== Description ==
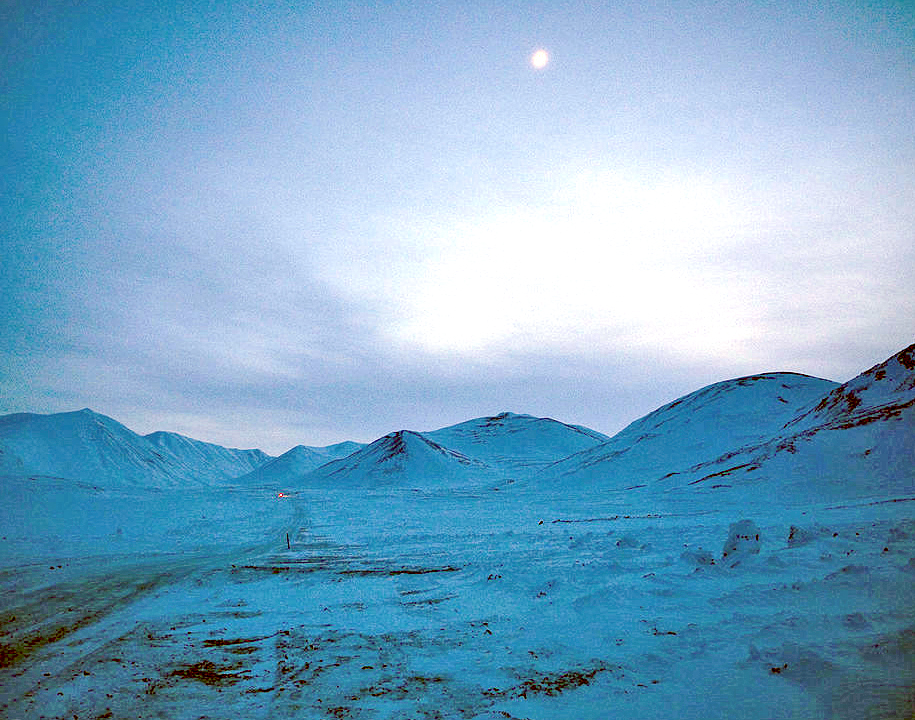
The ice road to Kupol.

The Kupol Gold Mine is located north of the Arctic Circle in the Chukotka Autonomous Okrug (historically mined by prisoners during the early Soviet era). The nearest town is 220 kilometres (140 mi) away. The mine employs 1,200 workers; those who reside in the far east of Russia work on a four-weeks-on, four-weeks-off schedule, while those who live farther away have a six-weeks-on, four-weeks-off rotation. Worker salaries are 25 percent above the regional average. The $40 million workers camp includes a full-size gym, sports hall, pool tables, music room, library, prayer room, televisions, and video library. An enclosed, 900-metre (3,000 ft) tunnel, dubbed the "Arctic Corridor", allows workers to travel between the camp and the mine without exposure to the cold during winter.

Sixty percent of the gold, which is mined for doré bars, is mined underground. In deeper parts of the mine, skilled operators maneuver drill rigs by remote control. This avoids the need for miners to work long hours beneath areas vulnerable to rock falls.

== Transport ==
=== Road ===
Between January and April, the only land access to Kupol is via a 360-kilometre (220 mi) winter road from the port of Pevek. Kinross rebuilds this road each year between November and January, with construction requiring a temperature of −25 °C (−13 °F) or less. Equipment, supplies, and fuel which will be needed during the winter months must be ordered two years in advance and shipped to Pevek, which is open only during the summer for three months. In 2008, the winter road accommodated 1,944 truck trips for the delivery of 3,000 container units, 60,000 tonnes of supplies, and 25,000 tonnes of diesel fuel. At all other times of year, Kupol is accessible only via helicopter and fixed-wing aircraft.

=== Aviation ===
The mine is serviced Kupol Airport located 12 km North from it.

== Output ==
As of 2011, the Kupol Gold Mine had produced 2 million ounces of gold and more than 20 million ounces of silver since 2008. In 2010, mine owners estimated that the mine could yield up to 2.5 million ounces of gold and 31.6 million ounces of silver.

== Notes ==
- ^[a]In 2011 Kinross purchased the remainder of Kupol, the 2010 figure is Kinross' share, or 75%.
- ^[b]Kinross began mining and stockpiling ore in 2008, but did not produce any gold until 2008.
