= 2022–23 Australian region cyclone season =

Cyclone season in Australia

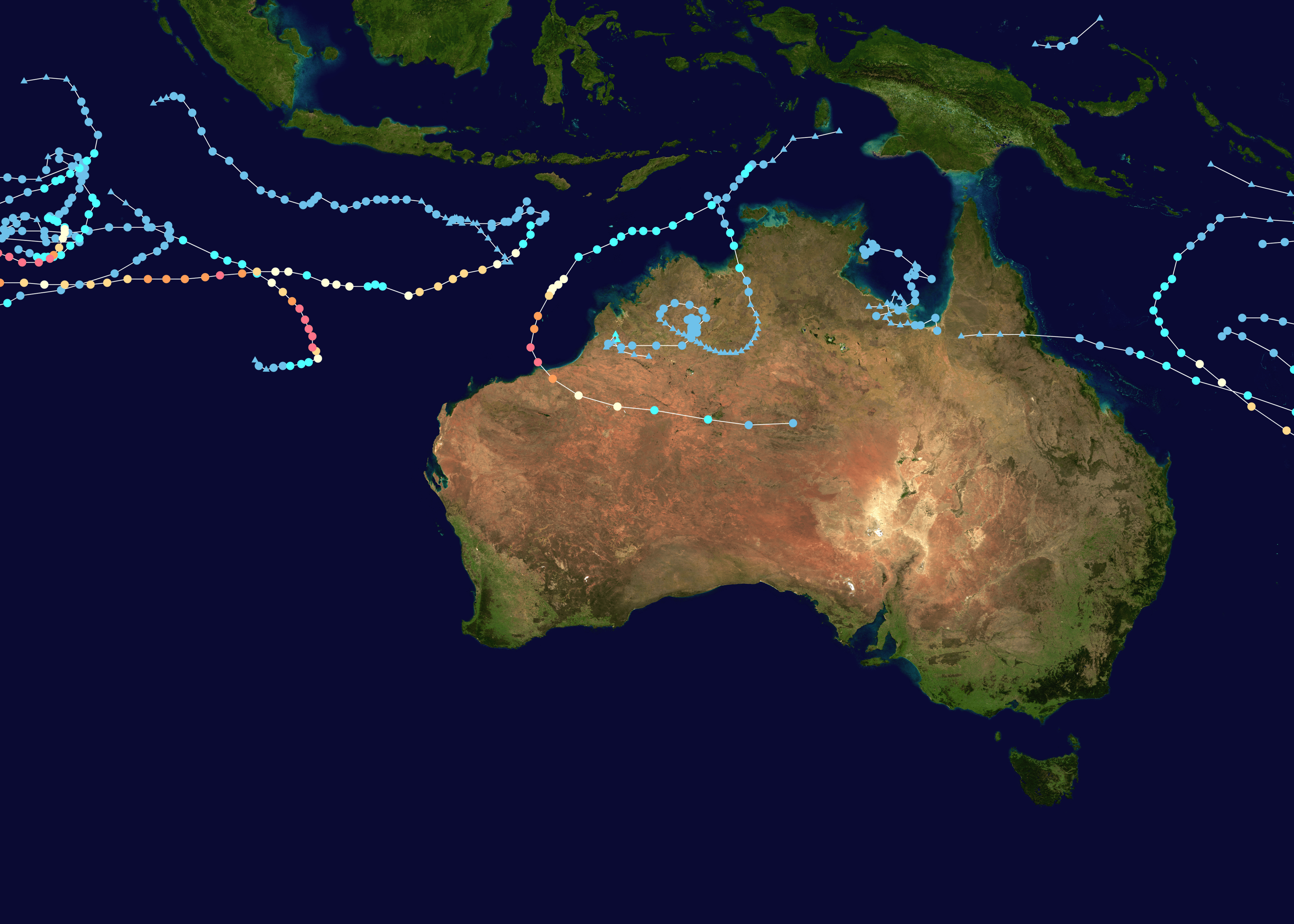
- Season summary map

Seasonal boundaries
- First system formed: 26 July 2022
- Last system dissipated: 2 May 2023

Strongest storm
- Name: Darian
  - Maximum winds: 230 km/h (145 mph) (10-minute sustained)
  - Lowest pressure: 915 hPa (mbar)

Seasonal statistics
- Tropical lows: 25
- Tropical cyclones: 7
- Severe tropical cyclones: 5
- Total fatalities: 8
- Total damage: > $225 million (2022 USD)

Related articles
- 2022–23 South-West Indian Ocean cyclone season; 2022–23 South Pacific cyclone season

The 2022–23 Australian region cyclone season was the fourth consecutive season to have below-average activity in terms of named storms. The season officially started on 1 November 2022 and finished on 30 April 2023, however, a tropical cyclone could form at any time between 1 July 2022 and 30 June 2023 and would count towards the season total, as Tropical Cyclone 01U proved in 26 July. During the season, tropical cyclones were officially monitored by one of the three tropical cyclone warning centres (TCWCs) for the region which are operated by the Australian Bureau of Meteorology, National Weather Service of Papua New Guinea and the Indonesian Agency for Meteorology, Climatology and Geophysics. The United States Joint Typhoon Warning Center (JTWC) and other national meteorological services including Météo-France and the Fiji Meteorological Service also monitored the basin during the season.

== Season forecasts ==
Region	Chance of more	Average number
Whole	73%	11
Western	69%	7
North-Western	70%	5
Northern	61%	3
Eastern	74%	4
Western South Pacific	65%	4
Eastern South Pacific	43%	6
Source: BoM's Seasonal Outlooks for Tropical Cyclones.

During October 2022, Bureau of Meteorology (BoM), New Zealand's MetService, and the National Institute of Water and Atmospheric Research (NIWA) issued its tropical cyclone outlook for the 2022–23 season. The outlook called for an above-average number of tropical cyclones for the 2022–23 season, with eleven tropical cyclones, predicted to occur. For the Australian region, the BoM predicted that the season would feature, only a 73% chance of more tropical cyclones. For the Western region, it was predicted that activity would be above average, with a 69% chance of tropical cyclone activity. The northern region and northwestern subregion would also see fewer tropical cyclones, with only a 61% and 70% chance of more tropical cyclones than average.

The BoM issued two seasonal forecasts for the Southern Pacific Ocean, for their self-defined eastern and western regions of the South Pacific Ocean. They predicted that the South-West Pacific region between 142.5°E and 165°E, had a 65% chance of seeing activity above its average of 4 tropical cyclones. The BoM also predicted that the South-East Pacific region between 165°E and 120°W, had a 43% chance of seeing activity above its average of 6 tropical cyclones.

Climate models also suggest that El Niño Southern Oscillation (ENSO) would return to neutral conditions in 2023. The BoM noted that sea surface temperature anomalies across the equatorial Indian Ocean. Warmer-than-average waters are expected to persist to the north of Australia for the next three months, increasing the likelihood of tropical cyclones. The BoM also predicted that the Eastern Region had a 74% chance of seeing activity above its average of 4 tropical cyclones. These outlooks accounted included the state of the ENSO. A lower average risk of tropical cyclones was predicted by NIWA for nations east of the International Date Line.

== Season summary ==
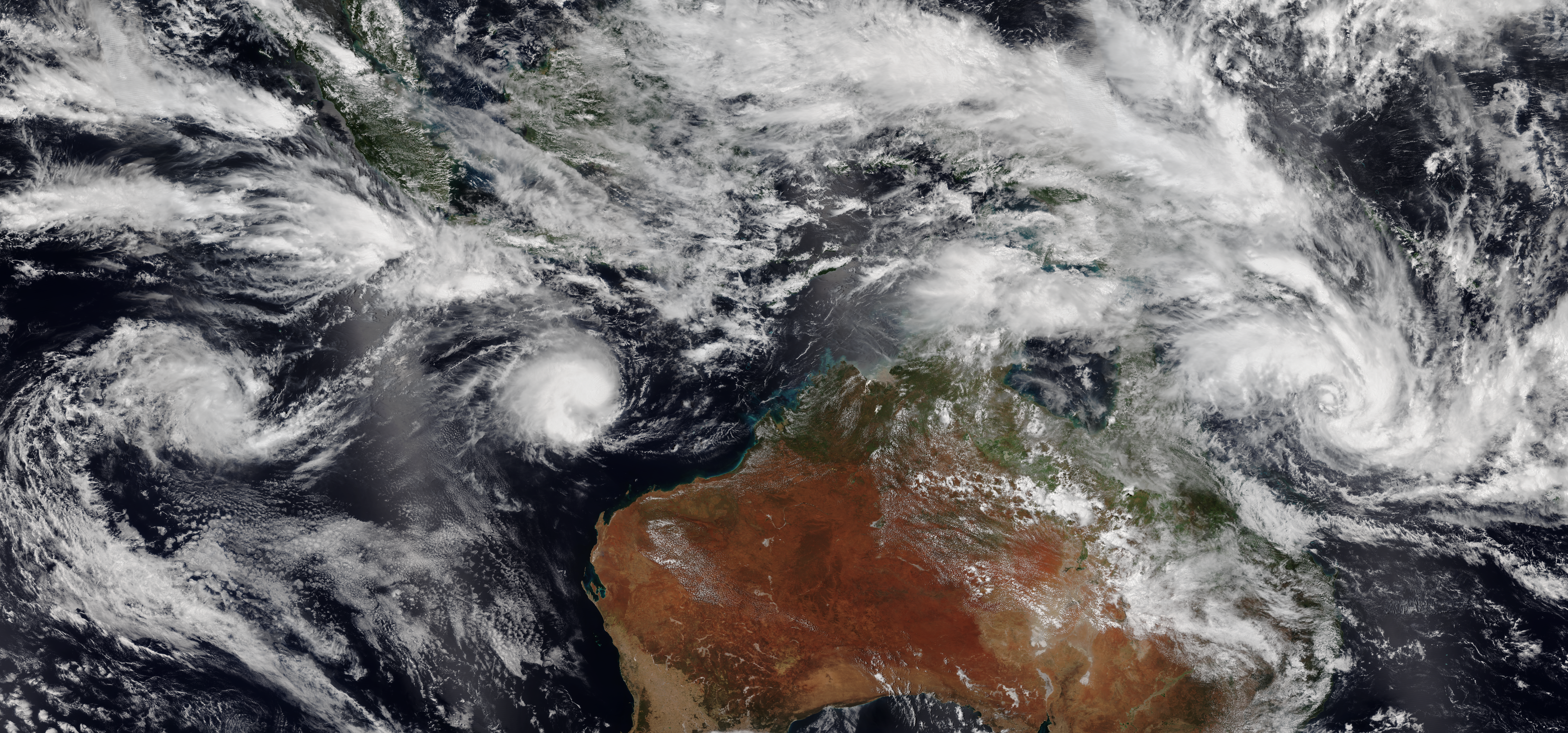
Three tropical systems near Australia on 8 February 2023. From left to right, they are: Tropical Low 11U (later Dingani), Severe Tropical Cyclone Freddy, and Tropical Cyclone Gabrielle.

The season officially begun on 1 November, however a tropical low would form on 26 July, an exceptionally early start to the season. The system would be assigned the name 01U and would produce gale-force winds and persistent deep convection for a couple of days before wind shear began to increase. In-post analysis, 01U was upgraded to a Category 1 tropical cyclone (Australian scale). In November, tropical low 02U was designated by the BoM and encountered marginally favorable conditions. The low was upgraded to Tropical Cyclone 04S by JTWC after tropical-storm-force winds were found. Later in the month, a tropical low formed and was a long-lived system before dissipating on 26 November. There was also another tropical low that formed in the Gulf of Carpentaria but did not develop further. In December, tropical low 05U formed, and was given the name Darian after intensifying into a Category 1 Tropical Cyclone. On 19 December, it became the first Severe Tropical Cyclone of the season. Throughout the day, the storm unexpectedly entered very favorable conditions, and underwent rapid intensification. It reached Category 5 on the BoM's scale the next day, and peaked as a Category 4 on the SSHWS scale, later exiting into the South-west Indian Ocean Basin. Later that month, a tropical low formed, later intensifying into a Category 1 Tropical Cyclone and was named Ellie. Ellie then later crossed the Northern Territory coast, making landfall at a sparsely populated location southwest of Daly River at 13:30 UTC (11:00 pm ACST). Shortly after the landfall, the JTWC discontinued warnings on the system.

The next day, the BoM's released its last bulletin on Ellie, as the system weakened into a tropical low. However, Ellie remained traceable, as it moved southwest towards the Western Australia region throughout the rest of December. The BoM then gave the tropical low a moderate chance of redeveloping into a tropical cyclone on 1 January. The storm then moved southeast and further weakened as it moved inland once again. On 6 January, the BoM stated that Tropical Low 07U formed from a monsoon trough over northeastern Australia. The JTWC later upgraded it to a Category 1 Tropical Cyclone (Australian Scale), and dubbed it as Cyclone 07P. However, the BoM did not upgrade the system due to lacking a well-defined center. 07U later moved into the South Pacific basin and was named Hale. Later in January, a tropical low become 06F in the South Pacific basin, and Tropical Lows 10U and 12U remained weak. In February, activity increased across the basin, with the formations of Tropical Low 11U, Freddy, and Gabrielle. Freddy took advantage of the favorable conditions and intensified to a Category 3 severe tropical cyclone. Gabrielle also steadily intensified to a severe tropical cyclone as the cyclone headed southeast and moved into the South Pacific basin on 10 February. 11U exited the Australian Region basin and was named Dingani in the Southwest Indian Ocean basin. Freddy later rapidly intensified to a Category 4 on both the Australian and SSHWS scales. Another tropical low, 15U, formed on 11 February and lasted until 17 February. After 15U, a weak tropical low formed, followed by tropical lows 16U and 17U. Another weak tropical low, 18U, formed on 27 February. 17U was last noted on 27 February, and on 1 March, 18U moved into the South Pacific basin, where it became Kevin. After a lull for a few weeks, tropical low 20U formed and headed southwest before degenerating off the coast of Western Australia. Another tropical low formed and was named Herman, which rapidly intensified to a Category 5 on the AUS scale with a warm and well-defined eye. Afterward, wind shear decoupled Herman and the cyclone dissipated. Tropical low 22U formed in the northern Arafura sea and dissipated. A westerly wind burst led to the formation of Tropical low 23U. After struggling against strong wind shear, the system was named Ilsa. The cyclone rapidly intensified due to jet interaction and peaked as a Category 5 both on the AUS and SSHWS scales before making landfall northeast of Port Hedland. A weak tropical low formed on 14 April. Another weak tropical low formed on 30 April.

== Systems ==
=== Tropical Cyclone 01U ===
- Category 1 tropical cyclone (Australian scale)
- Tropical storm (SSHWS)
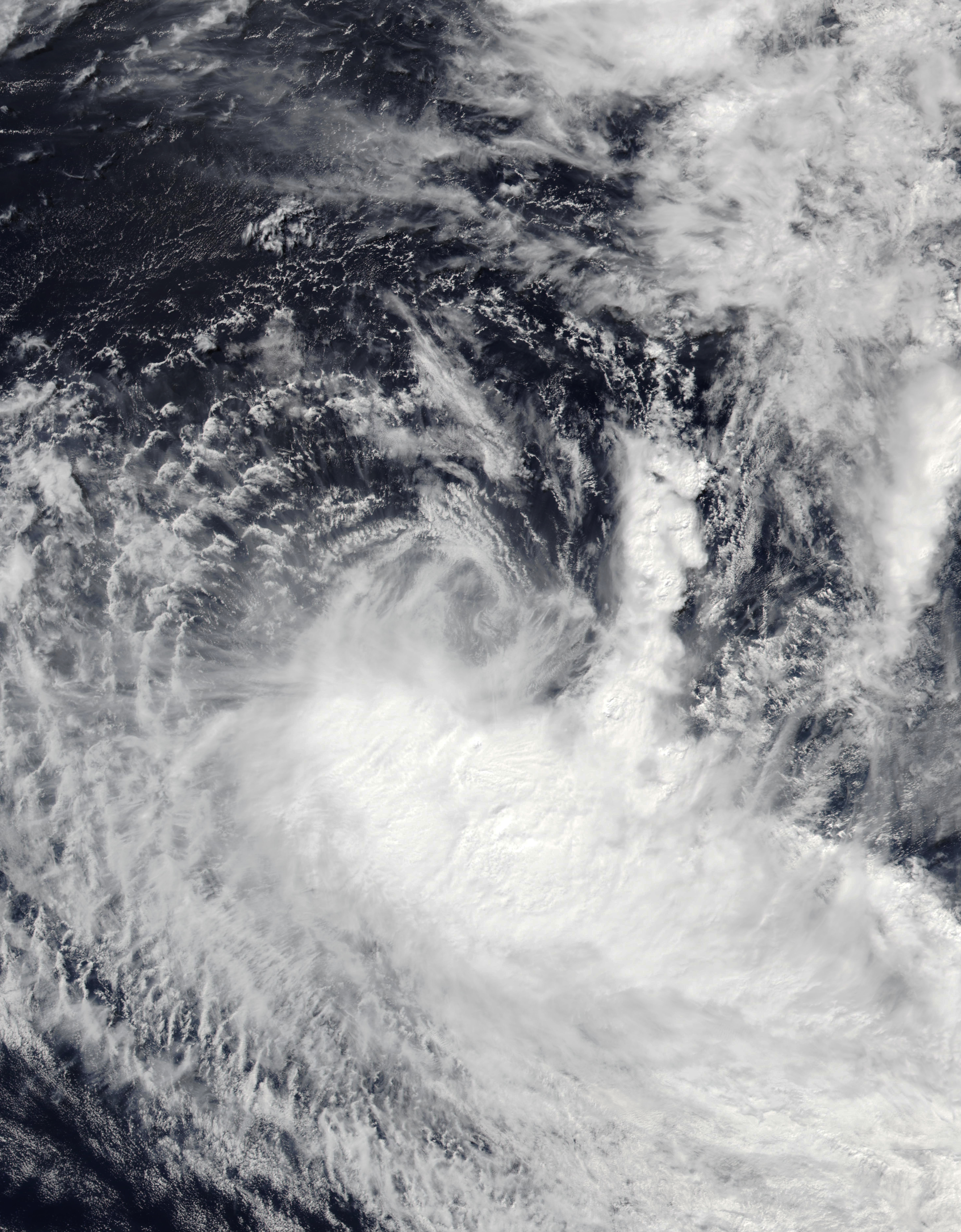
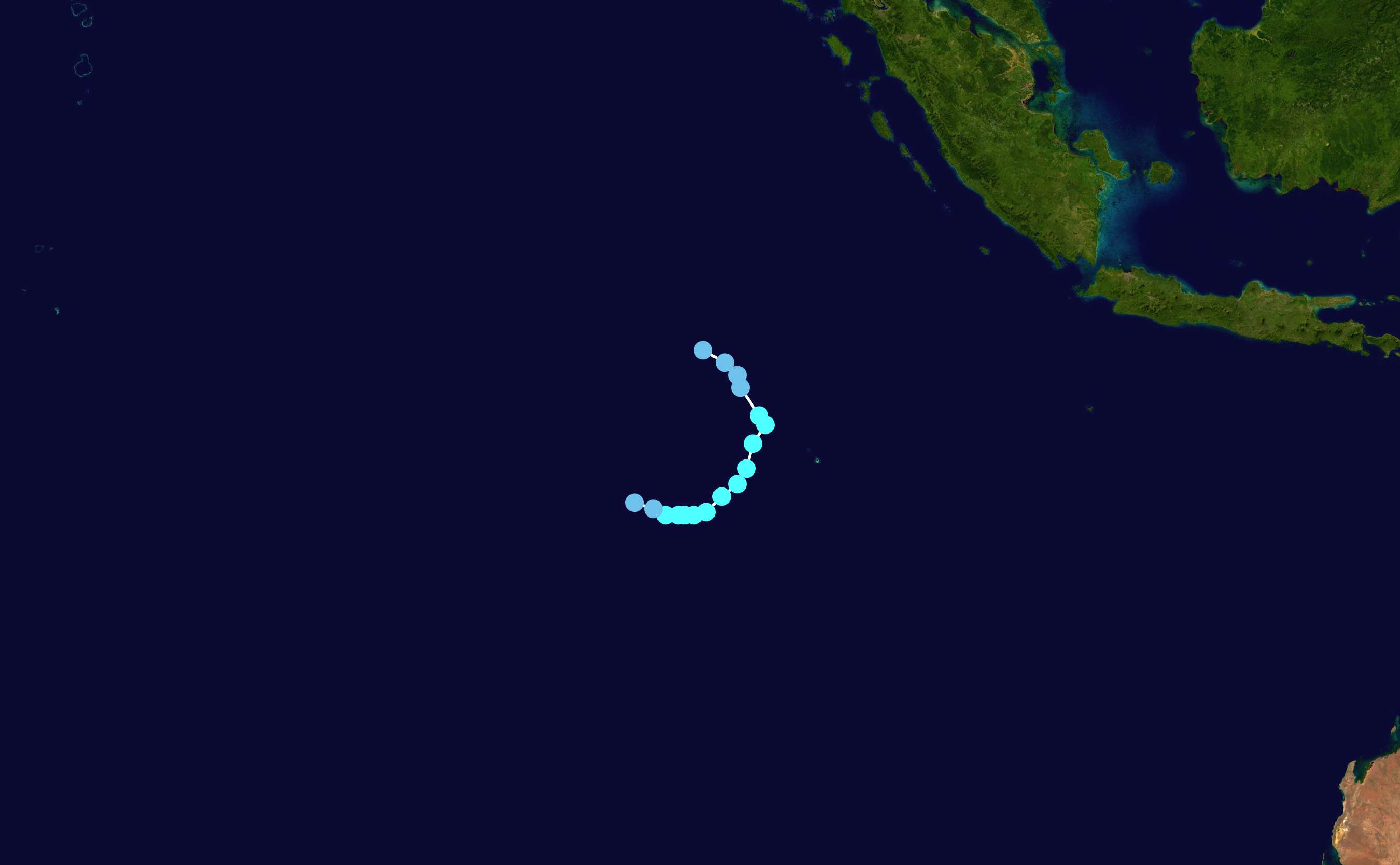
- Duration: 26 July – 31 July
- Peak intensity: 85 km/h (50 mph) (10-min); 993 hPa (mbar)

On 26 July, the Bureau of Meteorology (BoM) reported that a tropical low had formed due to an increase in monsoonal storm activity during the Madden–Julian oscillation (MJO). Deep convection became more pronounced and organized with an upper-level trough around the center. By 15:00 UTC on 28 July, the Joint Typhoon Warning Center (JTWC) issued a Tropical Cyclone Formation Alert (TCFA) for the disturbance. The system was located in a favorable environment, with sea surface temperatures ranging from 28 to 30 degrees Celsius, and the JTWC issued their first warning on the storm six hours later as Tropical Cyclone 01S. During post-storm analysis from the BoM, the system was upgraded into a Category 1 tropical cyclone on 29 July, although it remained unnamed. 01U reached its peak intensity with maximum 10-sustained winds of 85 km/h (50 mph), before gradually weakening. At 09:00 UTC on 31 July, the JTWC issued their final warning on the system. Later that day, 01U completely dissipated. The cyclone would not cause damages to the Cocos Islands despite near-gales occurring when it affected it.

=== Tropical Low 02U ===
- Tropical low (Australian scale)
- Tropical storm (SSHWS)
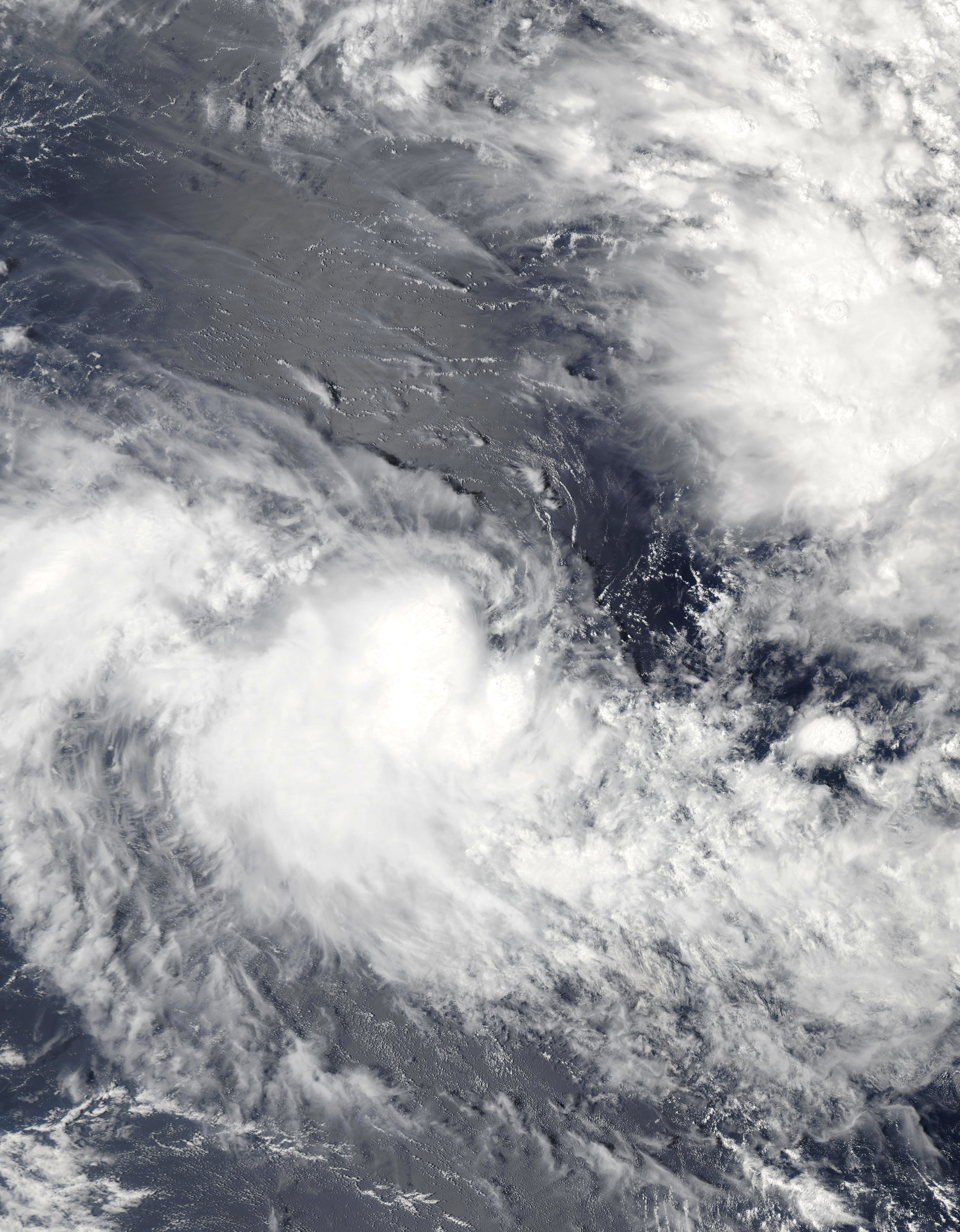
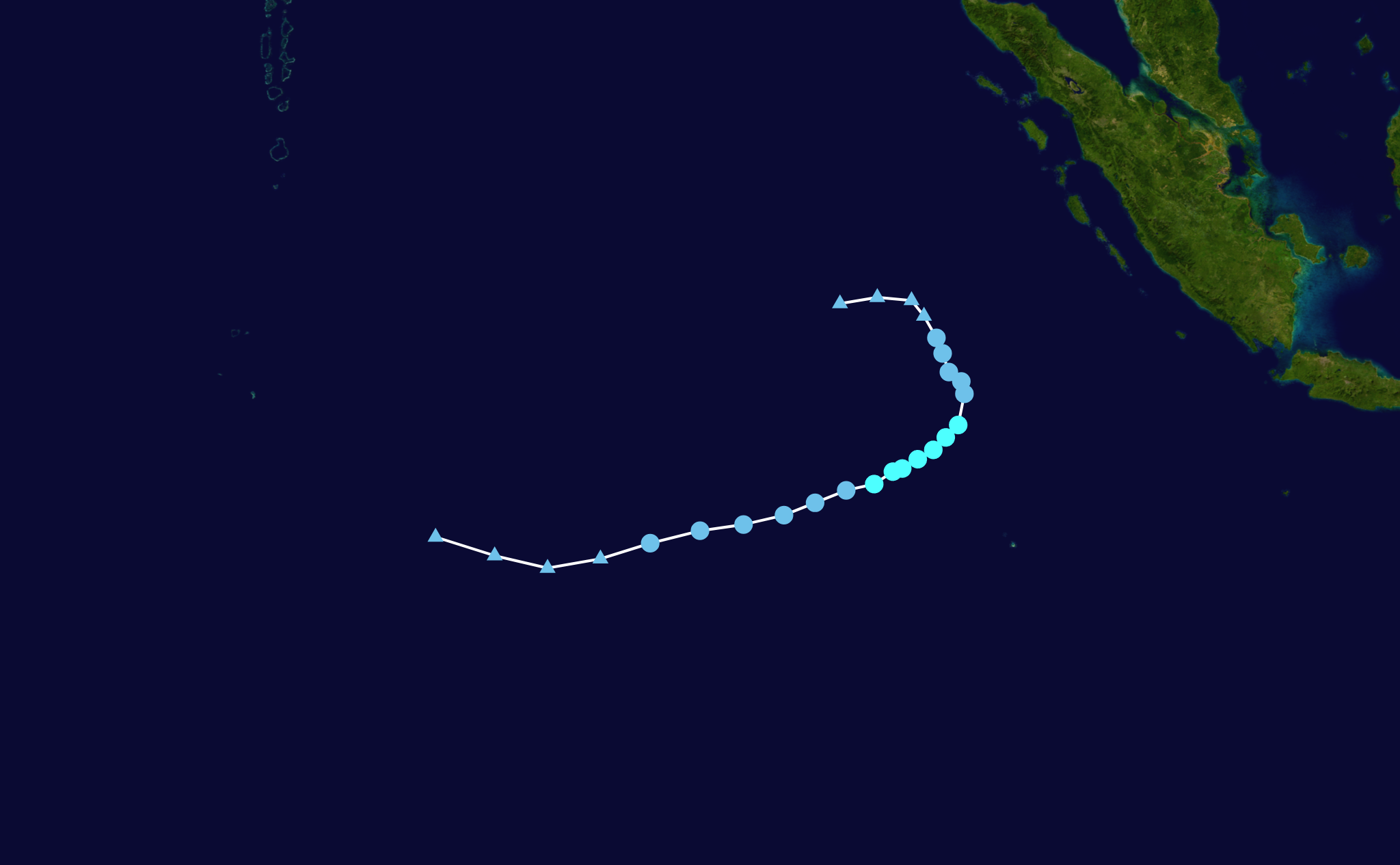
- Duration: 1 November – 5 November (Exited basin)
- Peak intensity: 65 km/h (40 mph) (10-min); 1000 hPa (mbar)

On 1 November, the BoM began tracking a tropical low to the northwestern of the region. Satellite imagery revealed that the system was displaced from its center of circulation. Environmental conditions were assessed by the BoM as being unfavorable for significant intensification of the system. The system was assigned the official identifier code 02U. Throughout the twelve hours, the system improved. At 03:00 UTC on 3 November, the JTWC issued a TCFA, after noting its obscure low-level circulation center (LLCC). Later that day, the JTWC subsequently initiated advisories on the system and classified it as Tropical Cyclone 04S. The system had a broad and fully exposed LLCC, although there was some thunderstorm activity associated with the system. The BoM would stop tracking the system on 5 November. The system would briefly exit the basin and enter the South-West Indian Ocean basin the same day.

=== Severe Tropical Cyclone Darian ===
- Category 5 severe tropical cyclone (Australian scale)
- Category 4 tropical cyclone (SSHWS)
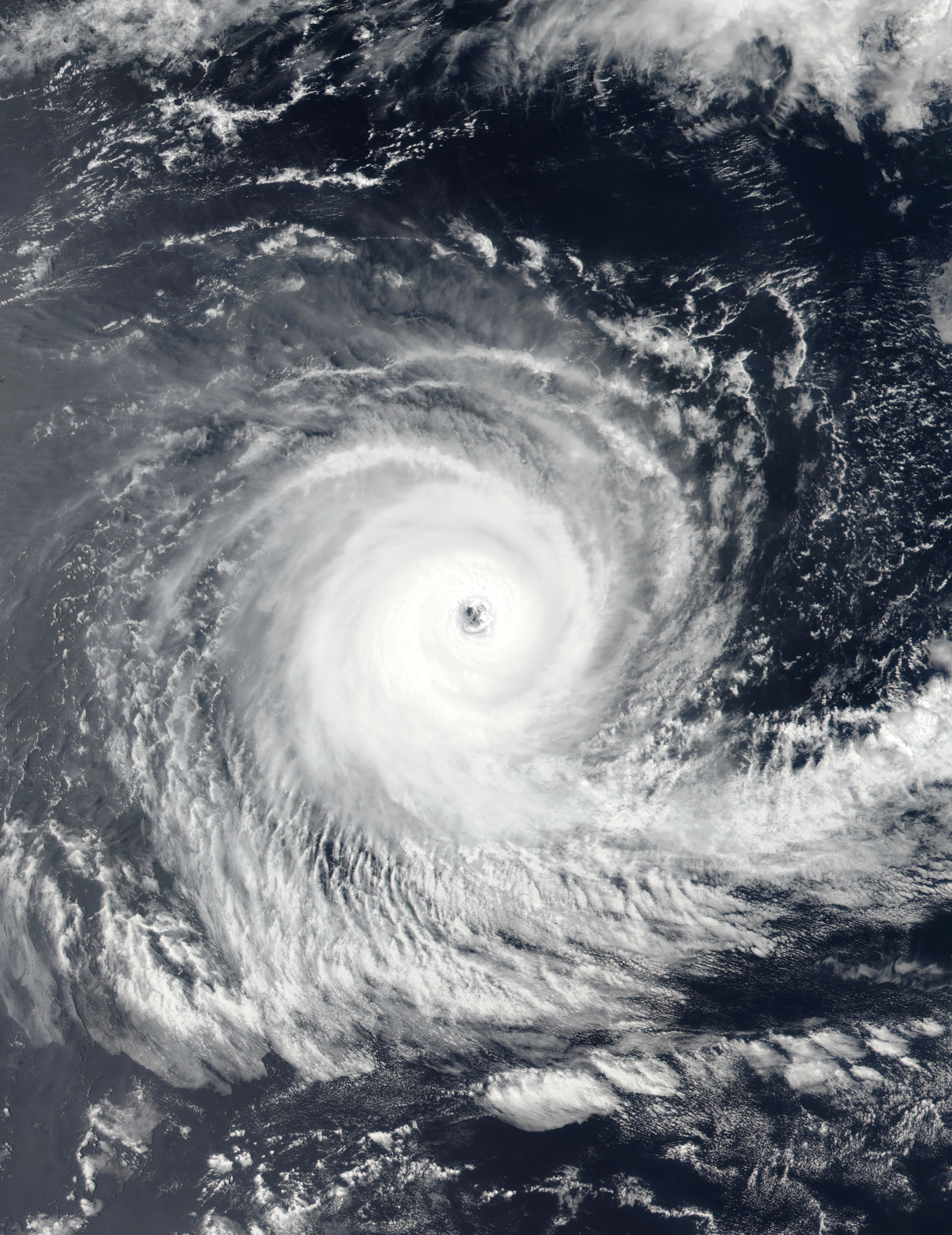
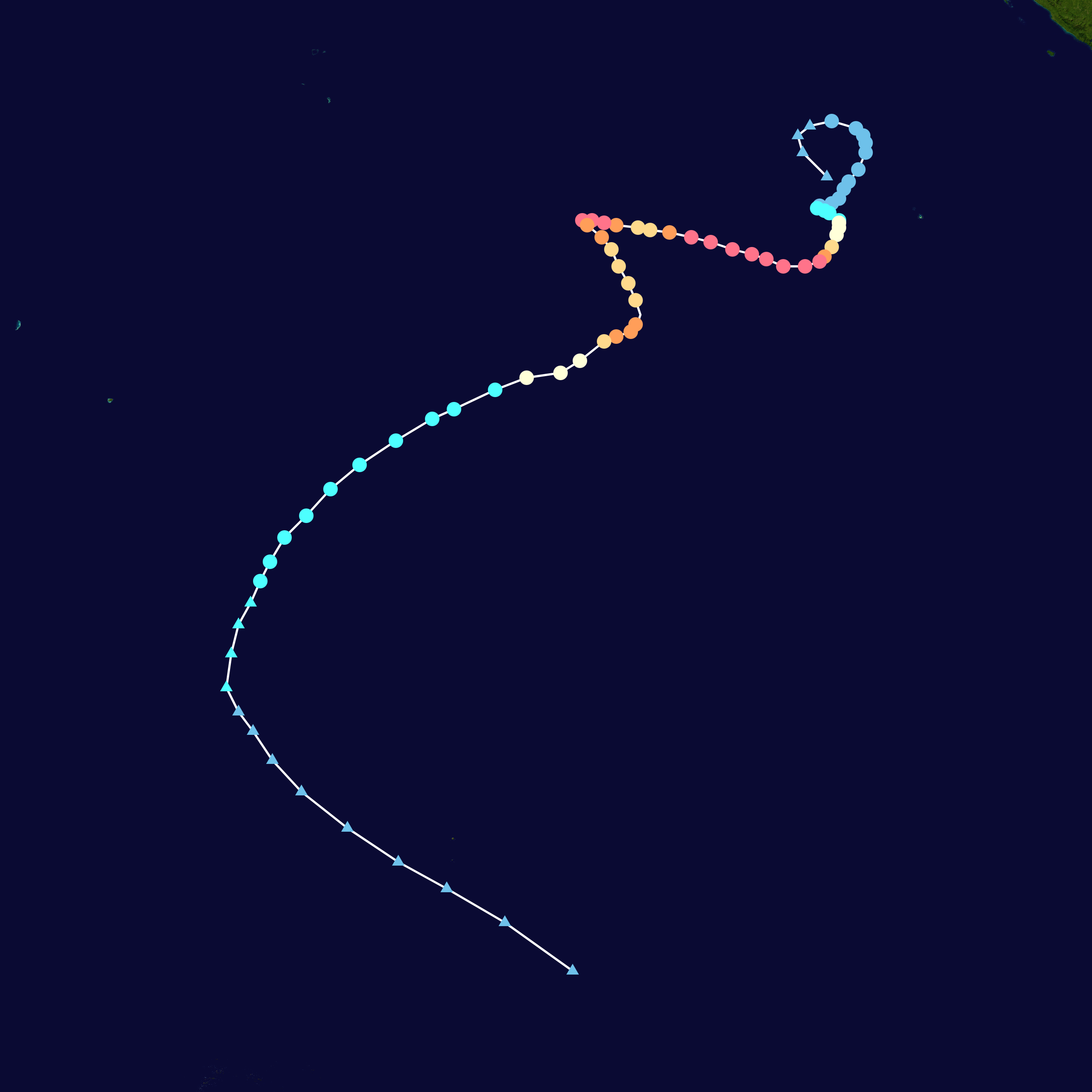
- Duration: 13 December – 21 December (Exited basin)
- Peak intensity: 230 km/h (145 mph) (10-min); 915 hPa (mbar)

On 13 December, the BoM reported that Tropical Low 05U had formed approximately 170 km (110 mi) north of Cocos Islands, initially forecast to not develop further due to not conducive conditions. However, over the next 5 days, conditions improved, with vertical wind shear decreasing. At 11:30 UTC on 17 December, satellite imagery showed a partially exposed low-level center embedded in deep convection, prompting the JTWC's to issue a TCFA. On the next day, the system strengthened into a Category 1-cyclone on the Australian scale, with BoM naming it Darian. Later that day, the JTWC initiated advisories on the system and classified it as Tropical Cyclone 05S. The BoM's assessed the cyclone to have strengthened into a Category 2 cyclone on 19 December and later to Category 3 cyclone on the Australian scale. By 15:00 UTC, the JTWC upgraded Darian to a Category 1-equivalent cyclone on the Saffir–Simpson hurricane wind scale (SSHWS), with maximum 1-sustained winds of 140 km/h (85 mph).

Darian then strengthened to a Category 3 equivalent cyclone on the SSHWS in an environment of low wind shear, warm sea surface temperatures and good upper-level poleward outflow, which led to the storm having a symmetric 23 nautical miles (43 km; 26 mi) eye. The cyclone quickly intensified, and was upgraded to a Category 4 cyclone by the BoM. Similarly, the JTWC's further upgraded Darian to a Category 4-equivalent cyclone around 21:00 UTC, while exhibiting some annular characteristics. Darian continued to rapidly intensify, and reached Category 5 intensity on the Australian scale at 00:00 UTC on 21 December. Later that day, it exited the basin and moved into the South-West Indian Ocean basin.

=== Tropical Cyclone Ellie ===
- Category 1 tropical cyclone (Australian scale)
- Tropical storm (SSHWS)
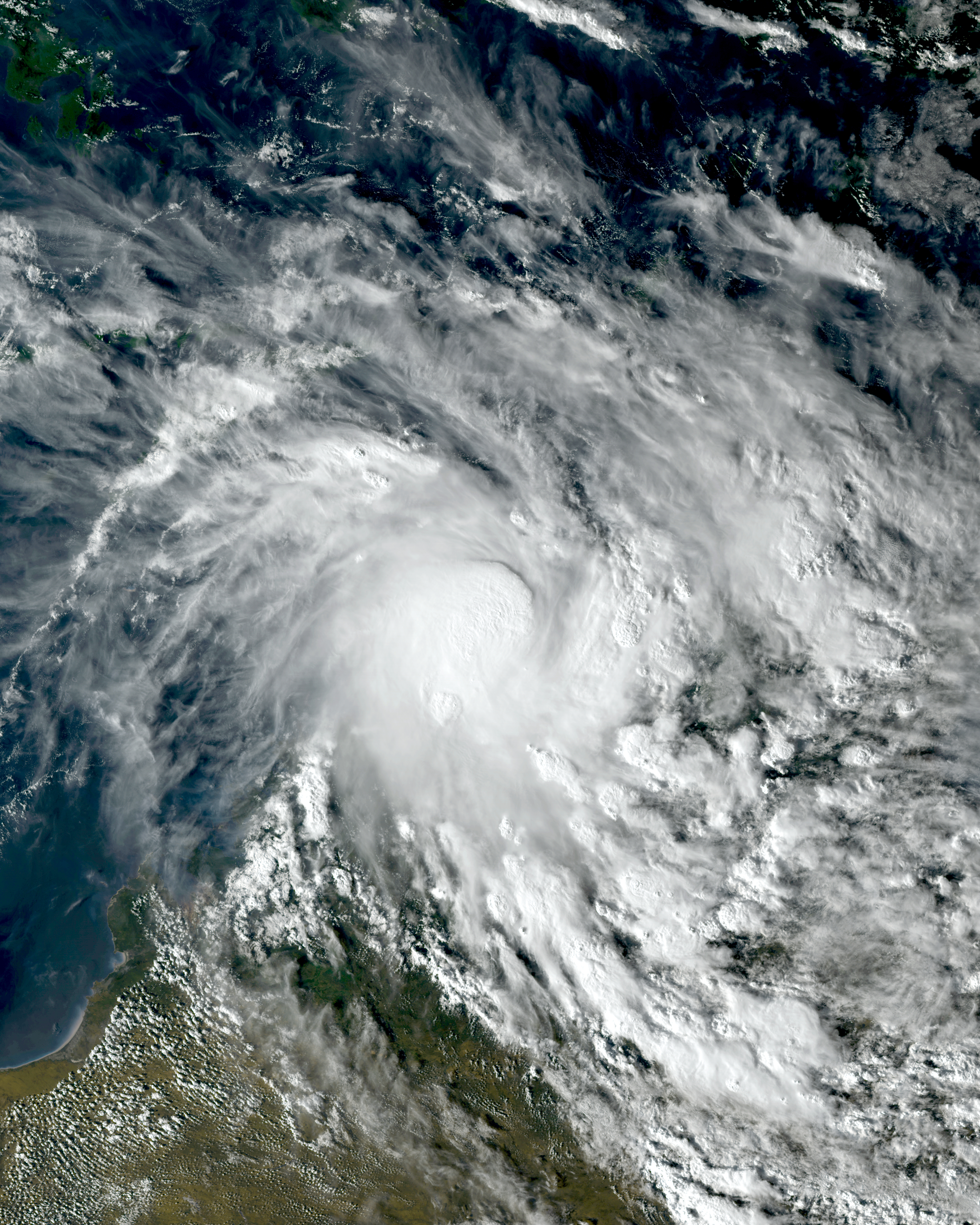
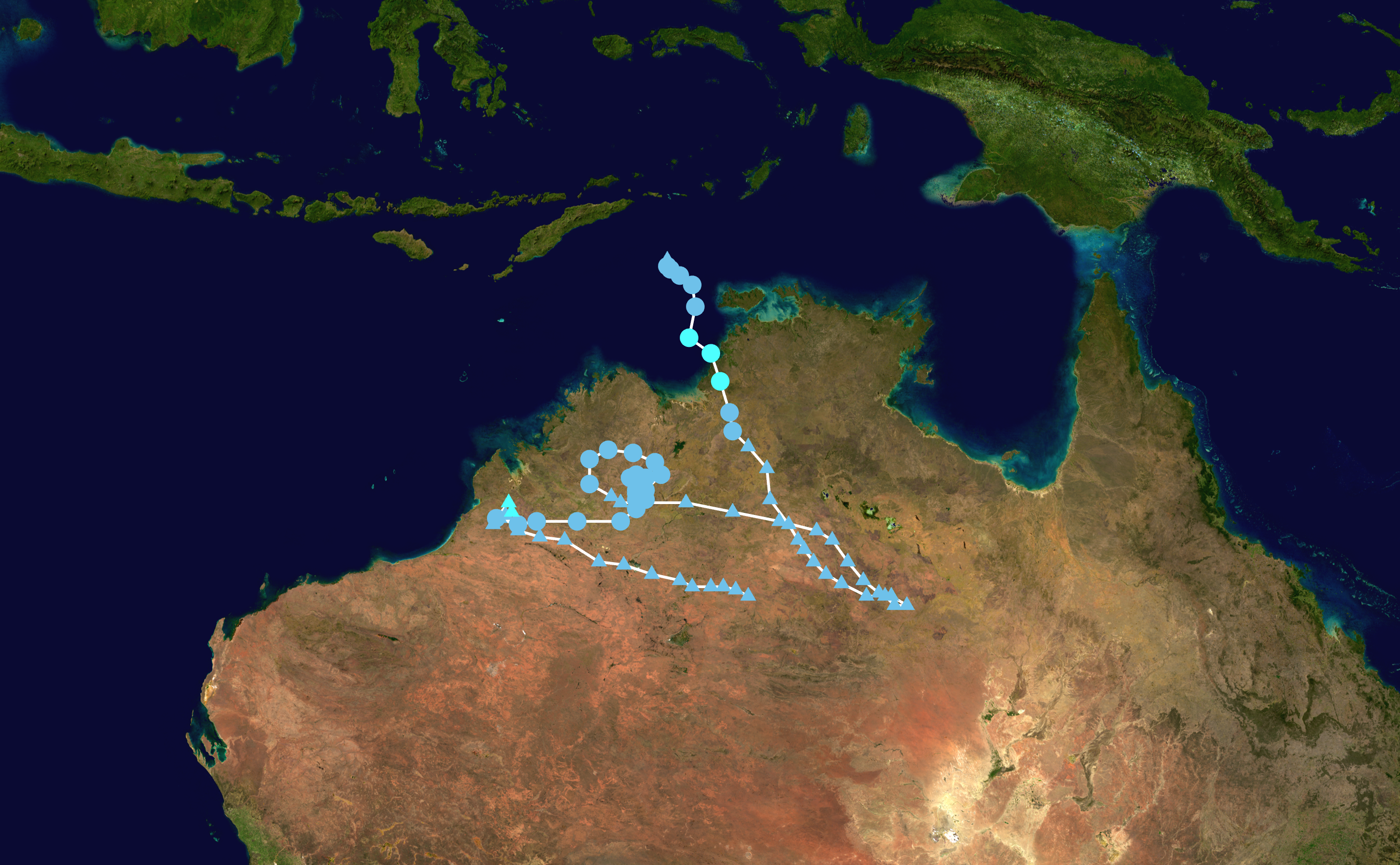
- Duration: 21 December – 8 January
- Peak intensity: 75 km/h (45 mph) (10-min); 990 hPa (mbar)

During late December, a strong pulse of the MJO tracked eastwards across the equatorial Indian Ocean, and approached Australian longitudes. During 20 December, the BoM reported that a tropical low formed within the monsoon trough northwest of Darwin in the Timor Sea. Initially located in a favorable environment for intensification, the disturbance began to encounter somewhat improved conditions. Satellite imagery indicated an improvement in the structure of the disturbance, with the system displaying an increase in flaring deep convection. The JTWC issued a TCFA for the system at 02:00 UTC on 22 December. The low was assigned the official identifier code 06U. By 09:00 UTC, the JTWC subsequently designated the storm as Tropical Cyclone 06S, citing that convection quickly became better organized and more concentrated around the broad center. Later that day, the BoM's reported that the tropical low had developed into a Category 1-cyclone on the Australian scale and named it Ellie. Ellie then later crossed the Northern Territory (NT) coast, making landfall at a sparsely populated location southwest of Daly River at 13:30 UTC (11:00 pm ACST). Shortly after the landfall, the JTWC discontinued warnings on the system. The next day, the BoM's released its last bulletin on Ellie, as the system weakened into a tropical low. However, Ellie remained traceable, as it moved southwest towards the Western Australia region throughout the rest of December. The BoM then gave the tropical low a moderate chance of redeveloping into a tropical cyclone on 1 January. However, they later downgraded its chances of redeveloping into very low, as the storm turned southeast further inland and was weakening. Despite remaining overland, the system intensified, causing gales over the west of Kimberley. The cyclone, then referred to as "ex-Tropical Cyclone Ellie", turned back into the Northern Territory on around 7 January, and eventually dissipating over the southwest of the Northern Territory on 8 January.

In anticipation of Ellie, the BoM issued a tropical cyclone warning for the coast of Western Australia and Northern Territory. The cyclone mainly caused torrential rainfall and gale-force wind gusts along the Top End as it became a tropical cyclone. Timber Creek experienced "once-in-50-year" flooding as the cyclone moved through the town by 24 December. Heavy rainfall led to water levels within the Fitzroy River reaching 15.81 m (51.9 ft), surpassing its 2002 record of 13.95 m (45.8 ft). By January, the river was 50 km (31 mi) wide in some parts. Flooding continued into January, with WA Emergency Services Minister, Stephen Dawson, saying that it was a "once in a century" flood crisis. Infrastructure was damaged and remote Indigenous communities completely cut off. Defence personnel were deployed to the Kimberley region in WA, three RAAF aircraft were provided to evacuate residents, and five helicopters were despatched to help with the crisis. Hardship payments were made by the state, territory and Commonwealth governments, and Prime Minister Anthony Albanese promised "massive infrastructure investment" when he visited the area afterwards. Damage of Ellie was estimated to be A$322 million (US$215 million).

=== Tropical Low 07U (Hale) ===
- Tropical low (Australian scale)
- Tropical storm (SSHWS)
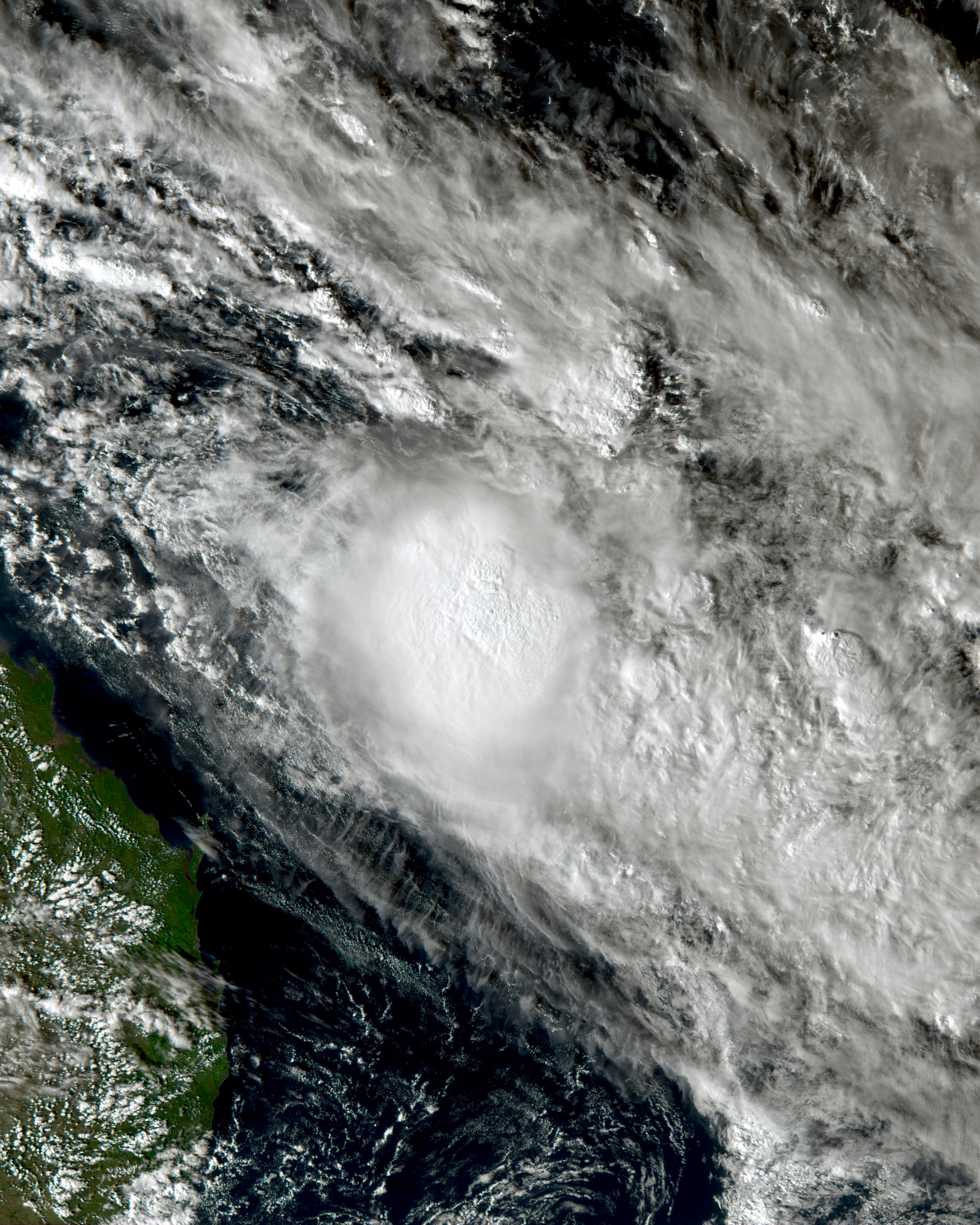
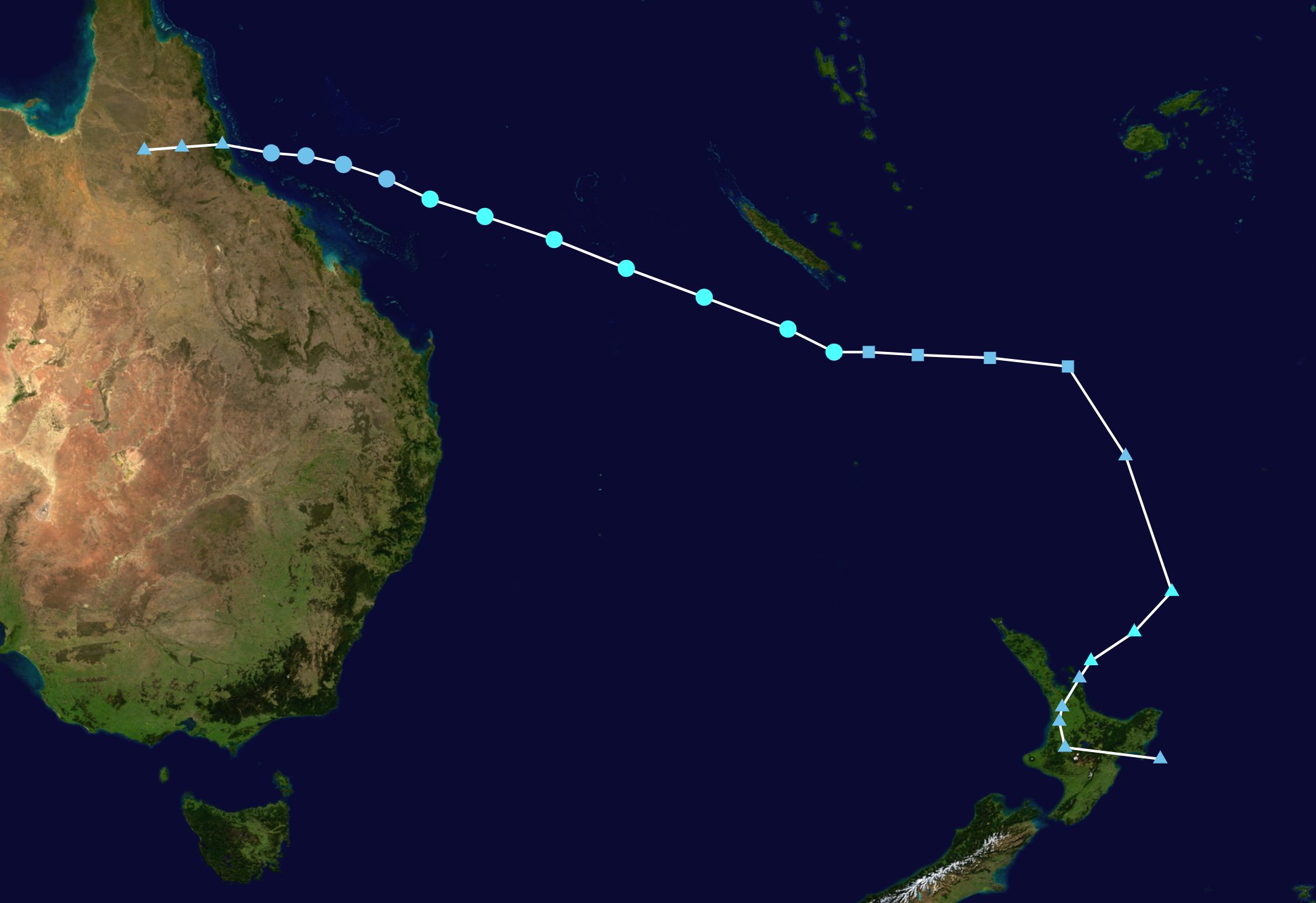
- Duration: 6 January – 7 January (Exited basin)
- Peak intensity: 65 km/h (40 mph) (10-min); 994 hPa (mbar)

By 31 December, the BoM noted the potential of a tropical low forming over the Coral Sea, as the monsoon was forecast to strengthen further over the region. Three days later, the agency put a low chance for the potential low to develop into a tropical cyclone in the region. By 6 January, the BoM reported that Tropical Low 07U had developed approximately 190 km (120 mi) to the north-northeast of Townsville in Queensland. The JTWC gave it a medium chance to develop into a tropical cyclone, before issuing a TCFA saying that the chance for the system to develop into a tropical cyclone was high 8 hours later. With a favorable environment of low wind shear, warm sea surface temperatures, and good radial outflow, the system intensified into a tropical cyclone late on the same day according to the JTWC, and designating it as 07P. The BoM did not upgrade 07U as such, citing that its center was elongated northwest to the southeast. 07U then later exited the basin and moved into the South Pacific basin.

=== Tropical Low 10U ===
- Tropical low (Australian scale)
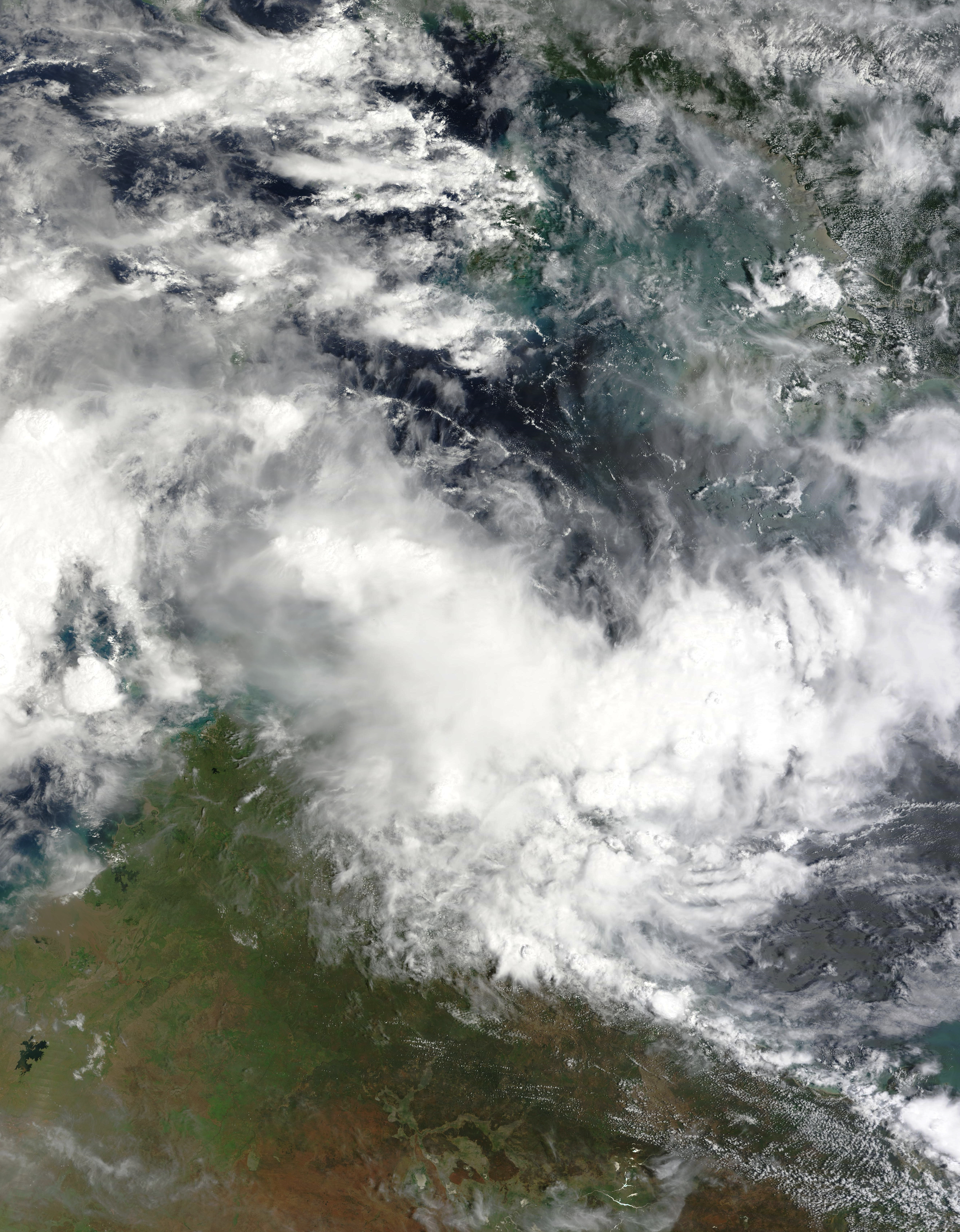
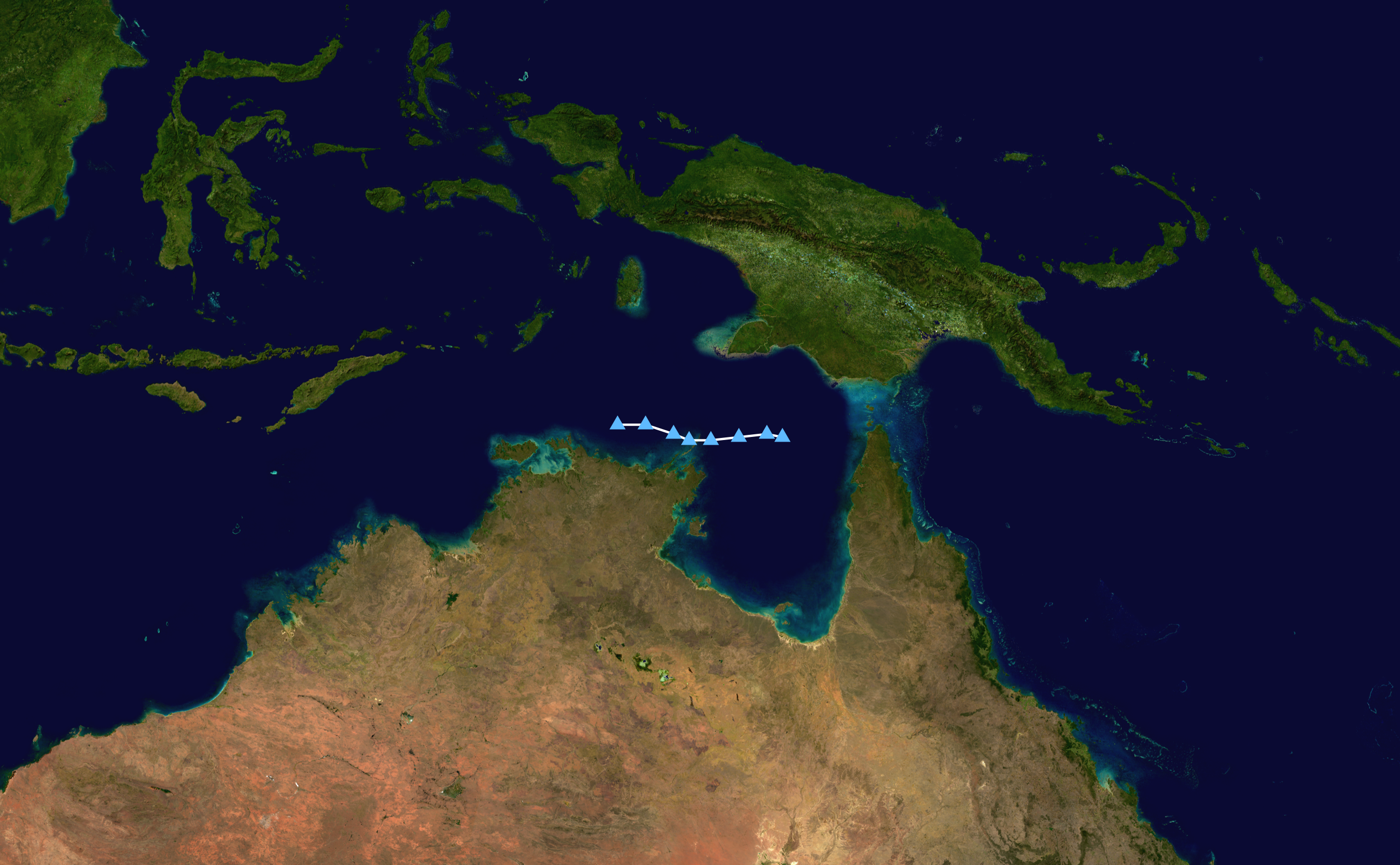
- Duration: 22 January – 26 January
- Peak intensity: Winds not specified; 1001 hPa (mbar)

On 19 January, the BoM noted that a tropical low may form within a monsoon trough that was forming over the Gulf of Carpentaria, and was expected to extend into the Arafura Sea. Over the next few days, the low slowly formed within the trough, and by 22 January, the agency reported that Tropical Low 10U had formed, approximately 170 km (110 mi) to the north of Nhulunbuy. The tropical low moved generally westwards, and was last noted on 26 January while being located about 470 km (290 mi) west-northwest of Kalumburu.

=== Tropical Low 11U (Dingani) ===
- Tropical low (Australian scale)
- Tropical storm (SSHWS)
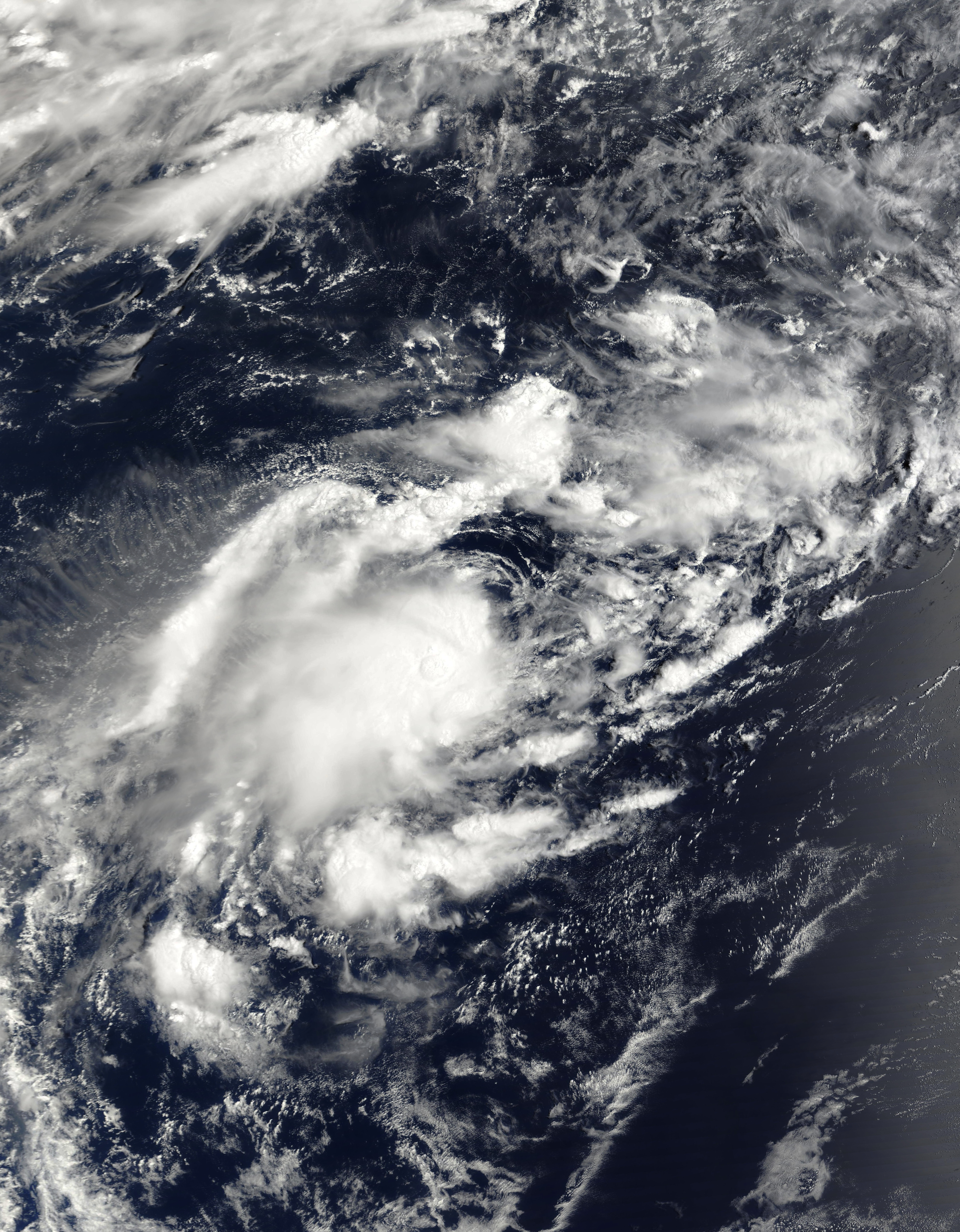
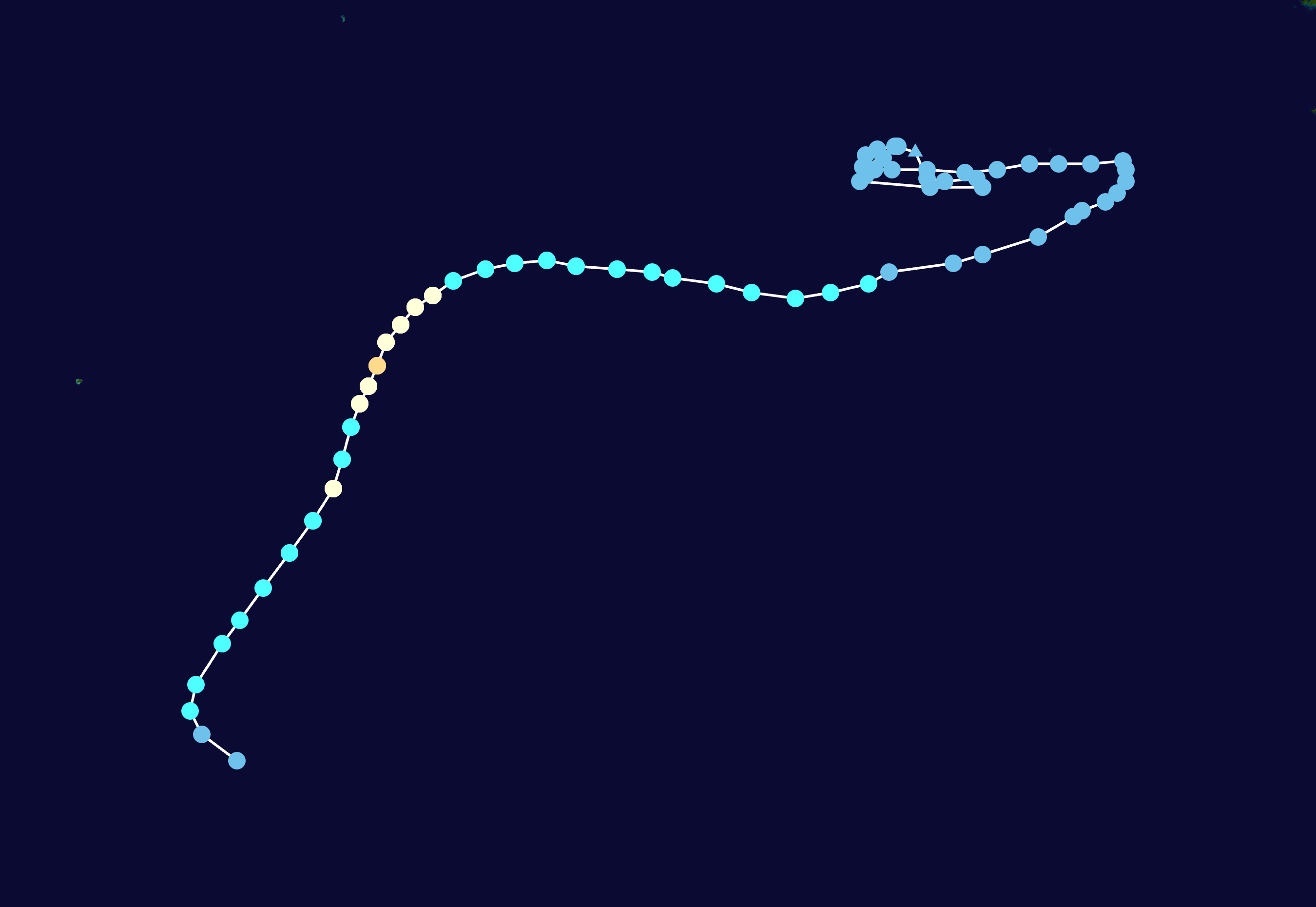
- Duration: 3 February – 9 February (Exited basin)
- Peak intensity: 55 km/h (35 mph) (10-min); 997 hPa (mbar)

On 3 February, Tropical Low 11U developed close to the Australian Area of Responsibility (AOR) boundary and headed west toward Cocos Islands. The low continued to be weak as the conditions were unfavorable for development. 11U then continued southwest, intensifying significantly. 11U exited the basin towards the South-West Indian Ocean on 9 February.

=== Tropical Low 12U ===
- Tropical low (Australian scale)
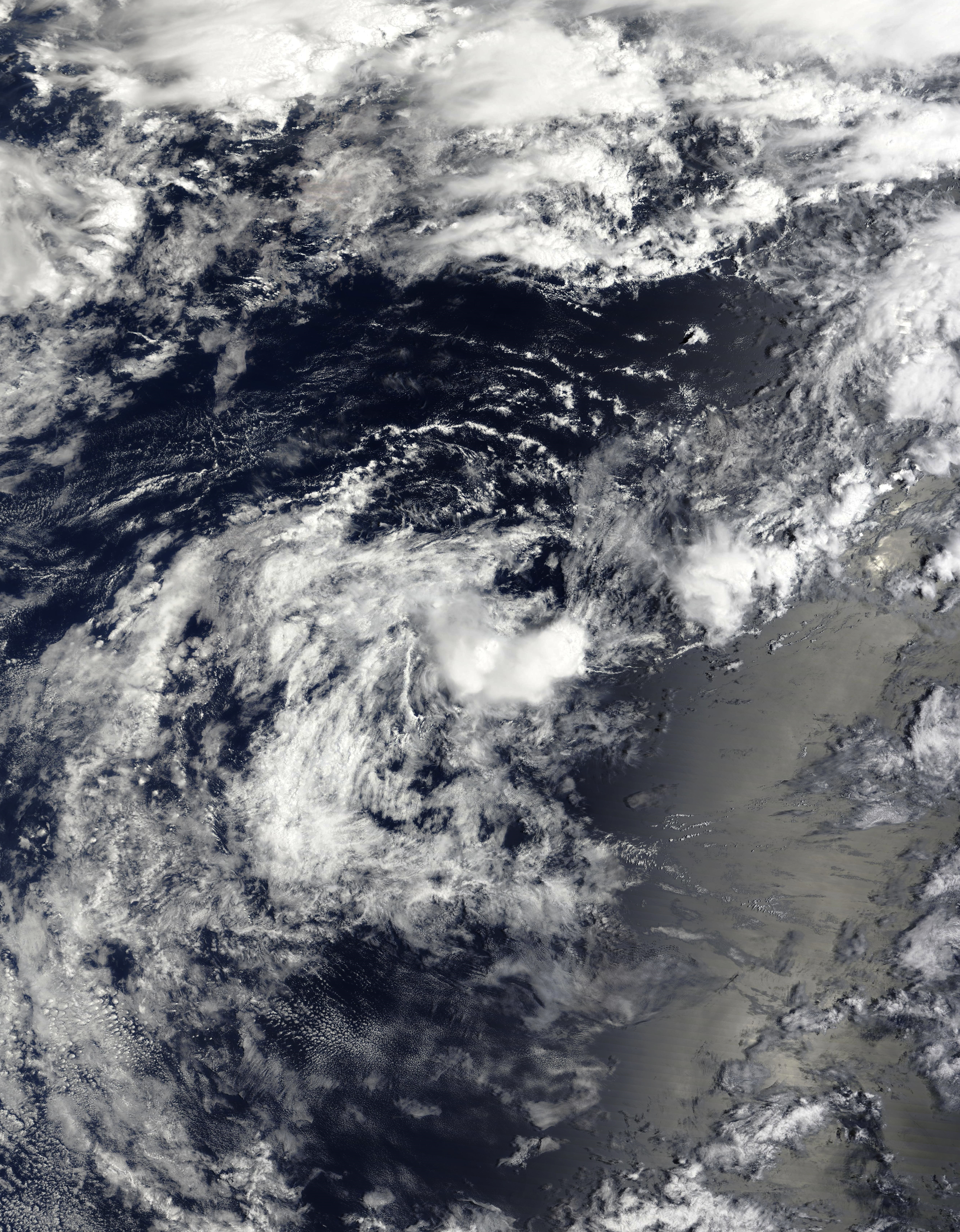
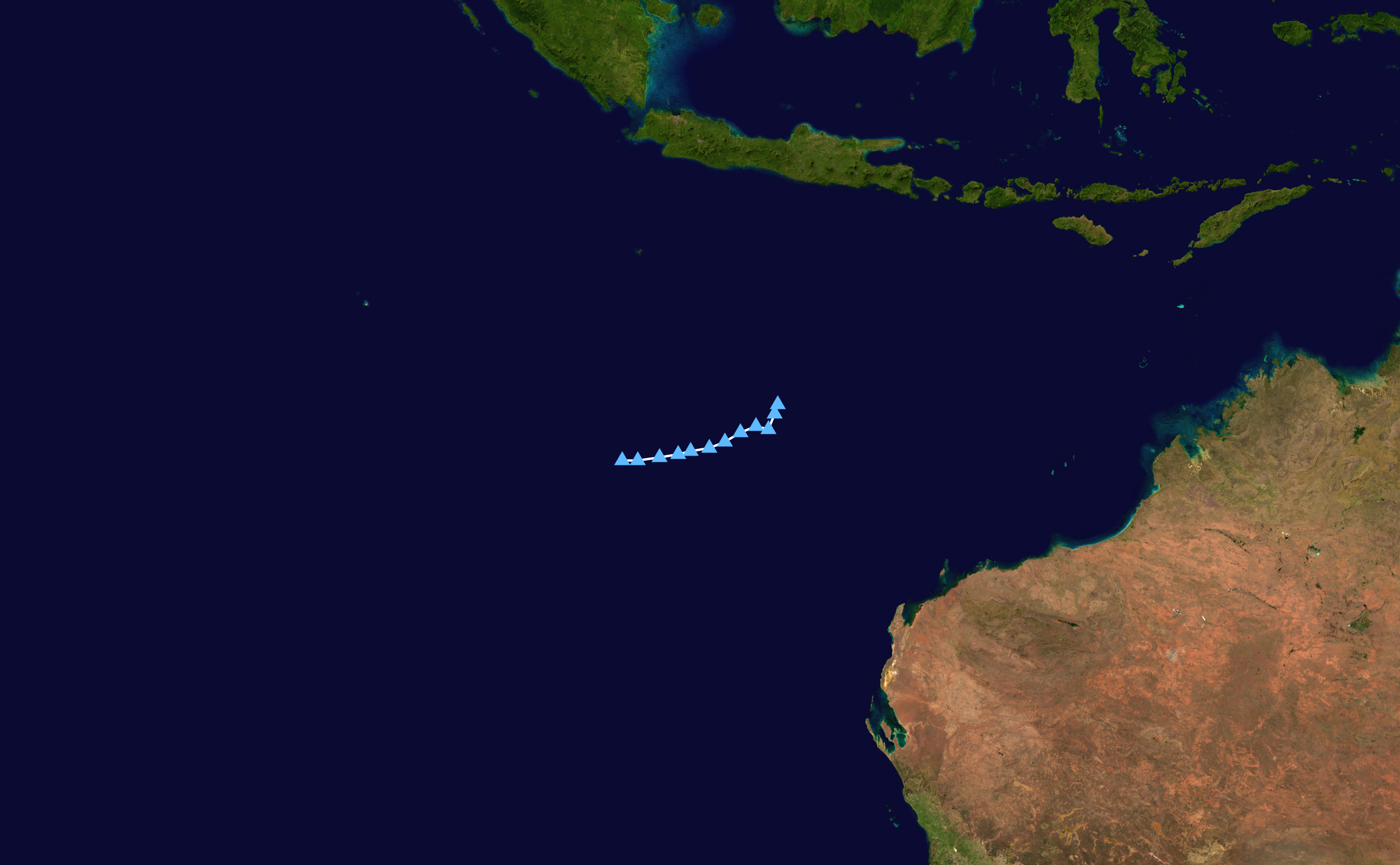
- Duration: 31 January – 4 February
- Peak intensity: Winds not specified; 1002 hPa (mbar)

On 30 January, the BoM highlighted that a weak low could form near Christmas Island, as the monsoon trough began to be more active across the tropics. By the next day, the weak low formed within the trough, and the agency classified it as 12U. For the next few days, the low moved slowly, before encountering unfavorable conditions for development by 3 February. The BoM last noted 12U about 740 km (460 mi) to the south of Christmas Island on the next day.

=== Severe Tropical Cyclone Freddy ===
- Category 4 severe tropical cyclone (Australian scale)
- Category 4 tropical cyclone (SSHWS)
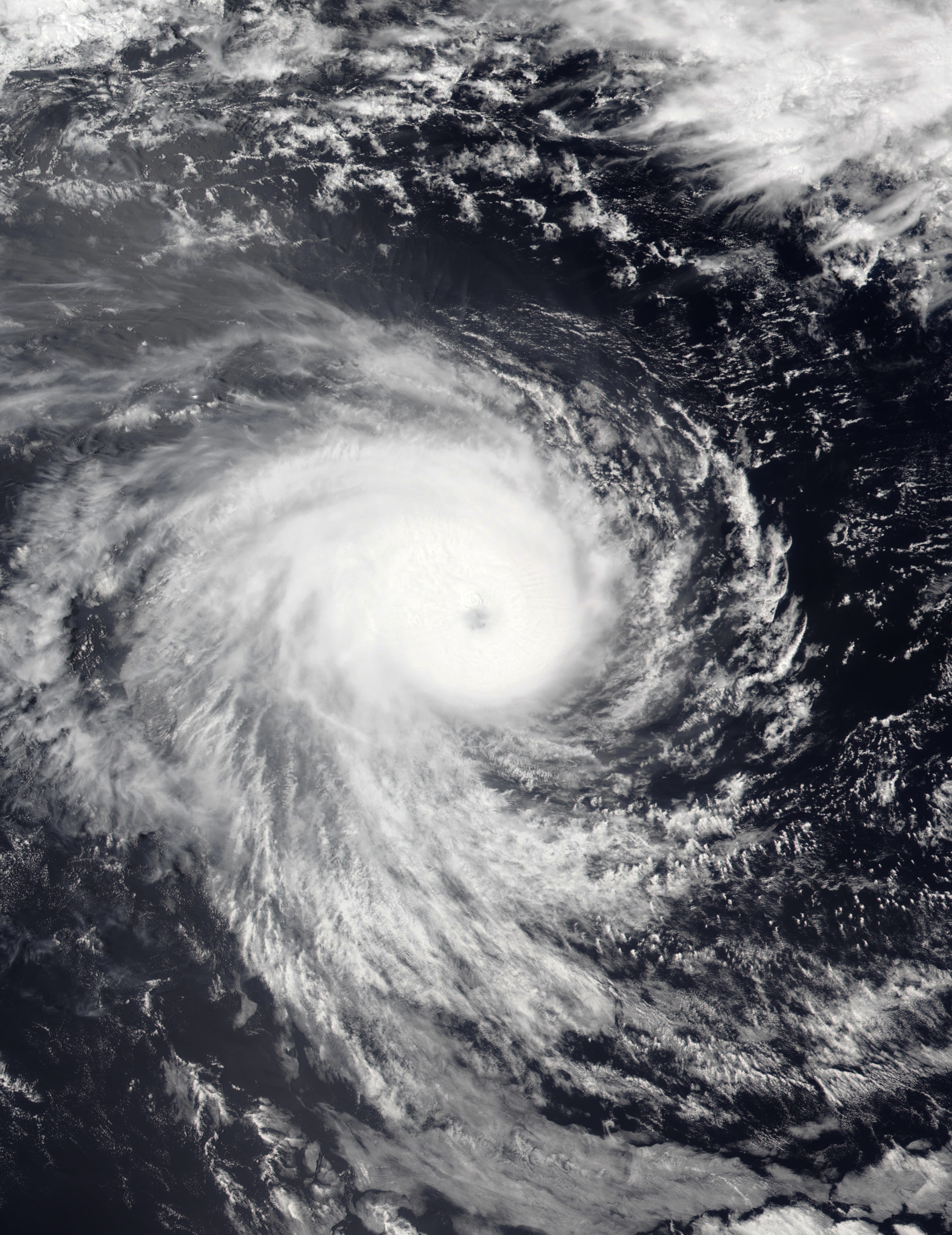
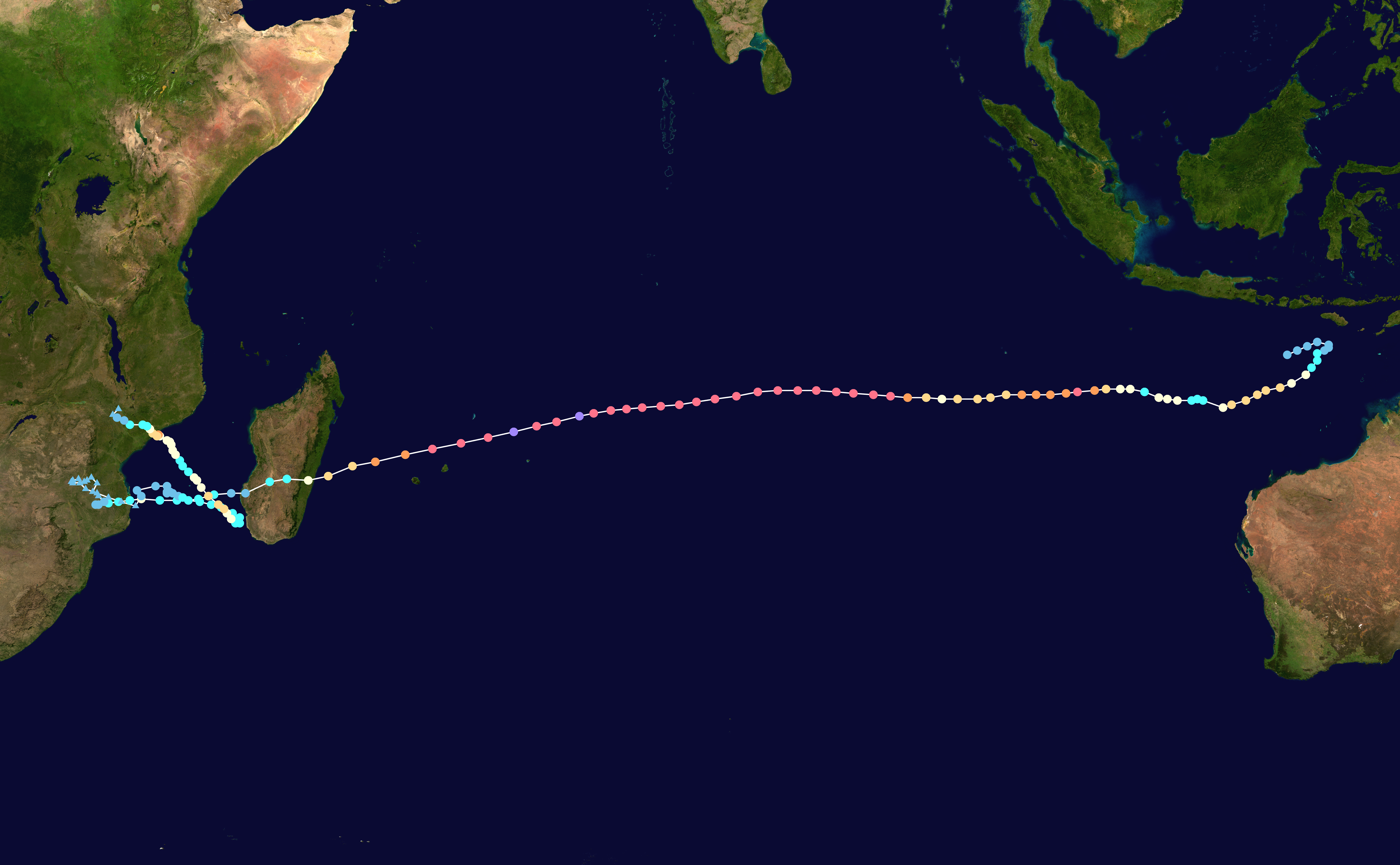
- Duration: 4 February – 14 February (Exited basin)
- Peak intensity: 175 km/h (110 mph) (10-min); 951 hPa (mbar)

On 4 February, the BoM reported that a Tropical Low 13U had formed during an active phase of the MJO in conjunction with an equatorial Rossby wave, while it was situated to the south of the Indonesian archipelago. Afterwards, the JTWC issued a TCFA, noting that the disturbance was located in a favourable environment. Deep convection increased and the system became a Category 1 tropical cyclone on the Australian scale by 12:00 UTC; the BoM assigned it the name Freddy. Freddy then rapidly intensified and developed an eye feature on microwave imagery, leading the JTWC to classify it as having near-equivalent intensity around 15:00 UTC on 7 February. After its first peak, the system became increasingly susceptible to wind shear and dry air intrusion, causing Freddy to weaken back into a minimal tropical storm by 09:00 UTC on 9 February. Freddy's deep convection around the storm's center had significantly decreased. Conditions became more favorable for development as wind shear decreased and deep convection began to consolidate and wrap around the cyclone. Consequently, the cyclone quickly restrengthened with the storm becoming a Category 3 severe tropical cyclone—attaining an initial peak intensity with winds of 150 km/h (90 mph)—and at 18:00 UTC on 11 February, Freddy reached its second peak intensity as a high-end Category 4 severe tropical cyclone in the Australian basin, with winds of 175 km/h (110 mph) and a central barometric pressure of 951 hPa (28.08 inHg). Freddy's structure continued to gradually weaken before moving over the South-West Indian Ocean. At around 12:00 UTC on 14 February, the BoM passed the responsibility of tracking the system over to the MFR. Thus, the system was initially classified as a tropical cyclone status before being later upgraded to intense tropical cyclone status around 18:00 UTC that day.

=== Severe Tropical Cyclone Gabrielle ===
- Category 3 severe tropical cyclone (Australian scale)
- Category 2 tropical cyclone (SSHWS)
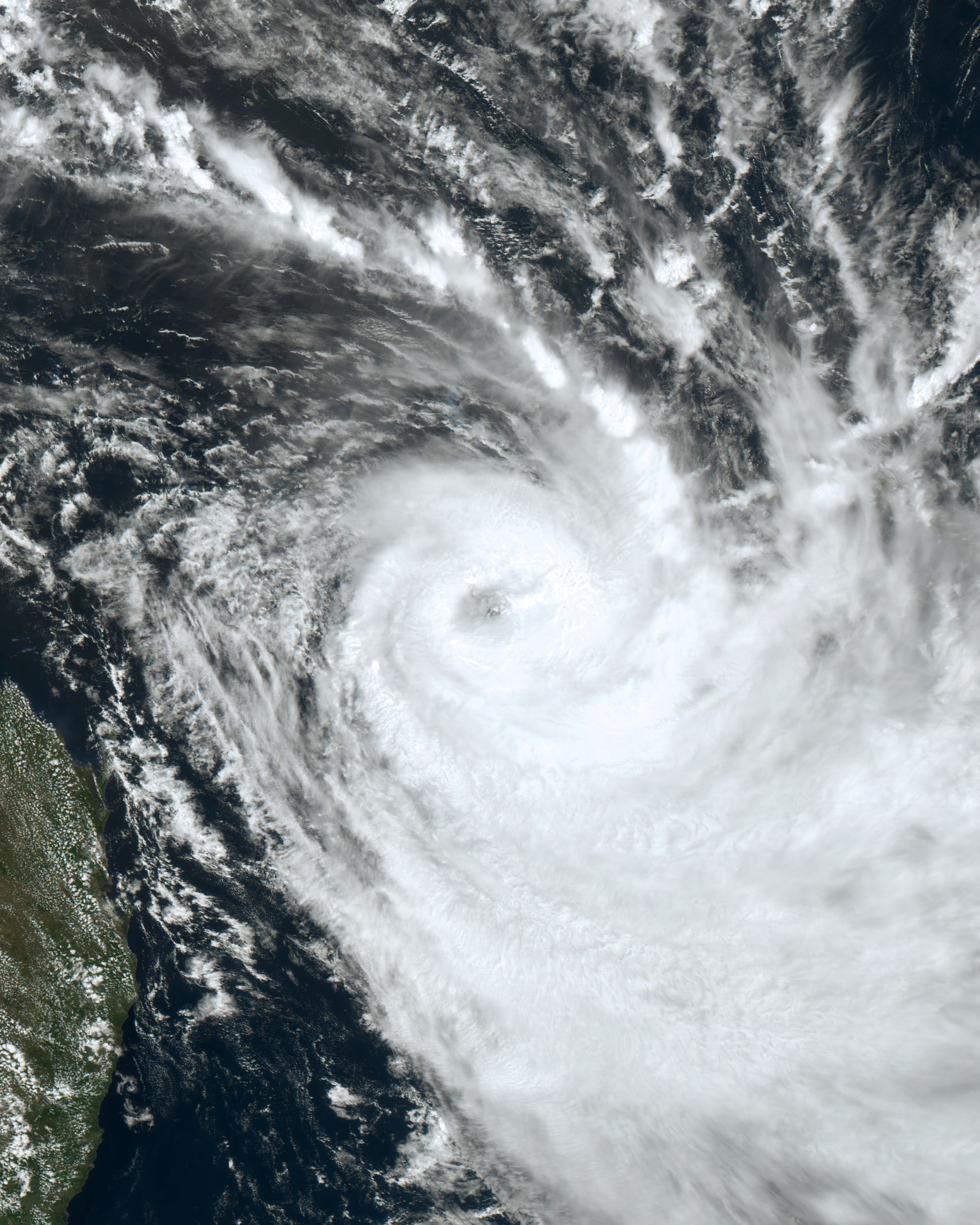
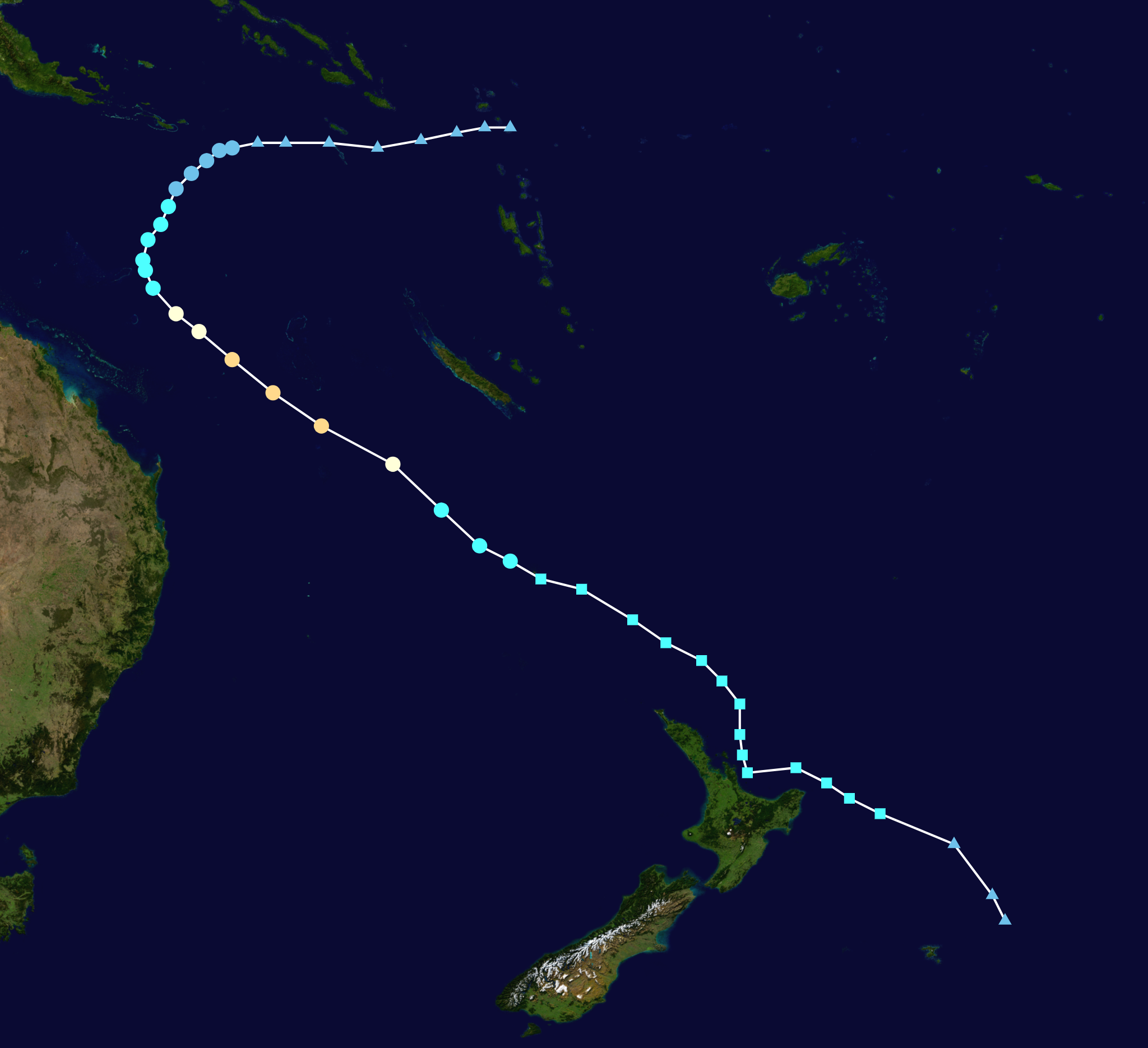
- Duration: 5 February – 10 February (Exited basin)
- Peak intensity: 150 km/h (90 mph) (10-min); 958 hPa (mbar)

On 5 February, a tropical low formed in the Coral Sea south of the Solomon Islands. At around the same time, the system's LLCC was exposed with persistent disorganized convection. Over the next day, as the system moved southwards, it developed further, with satellite imagery showing an increase in the cyclonic curvature of the convection. Later at 06:00 UTC, the JTWC issued a TCFA, after noting its obscure LLC. By 03:00 UTC on 8 February, the JTWC initiated advisories on the system and classified it as Tropical Cyclone 12P, when the fragmented banding was wrapping broadly into the exposed consolidating LLC. Late on the same day, the BoM reported that the tropical low had developed into a Category 1 tropical cyclone and named it Gabrielle. The cyclone slowly drifted southwards while deep convection consolidated, and the system was upgraded into a Category 2 tropical cyclone, while the JTWC upgraded Gabrielle to the equivalent of a low-end Category 1-equivalent cyclone with winds of 120 km/h (75 mph). By 18:00 UTC on 9 February, the storm continued to intensify and soon became a Category 3 severe tropical cyclone. Later the next day, it exited the basin and moved into the South Pacific basin, where it became a Category 2-equivalent cyclone.

=== Tropical Low 15U ===
- Tropical low (Australian scale)
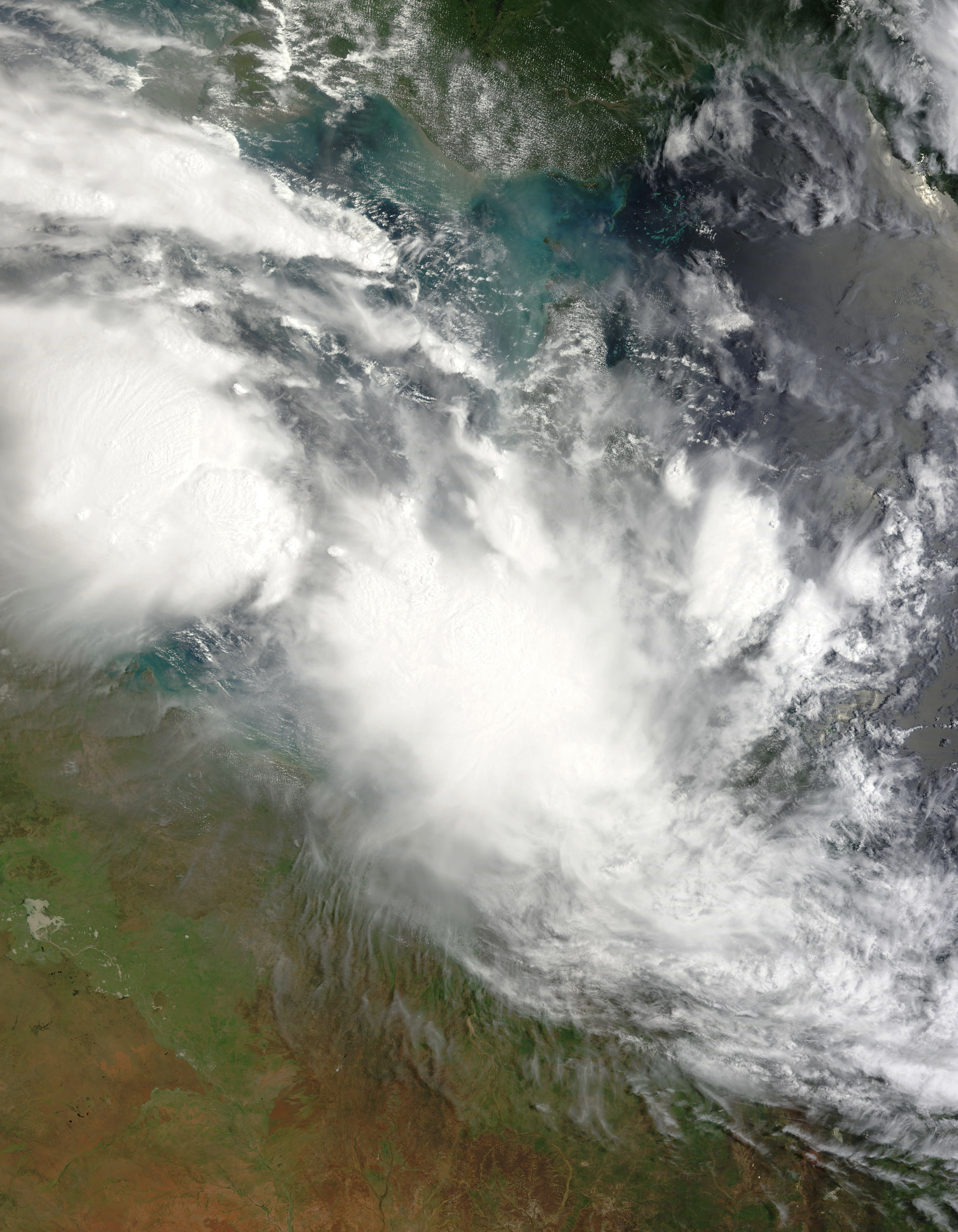
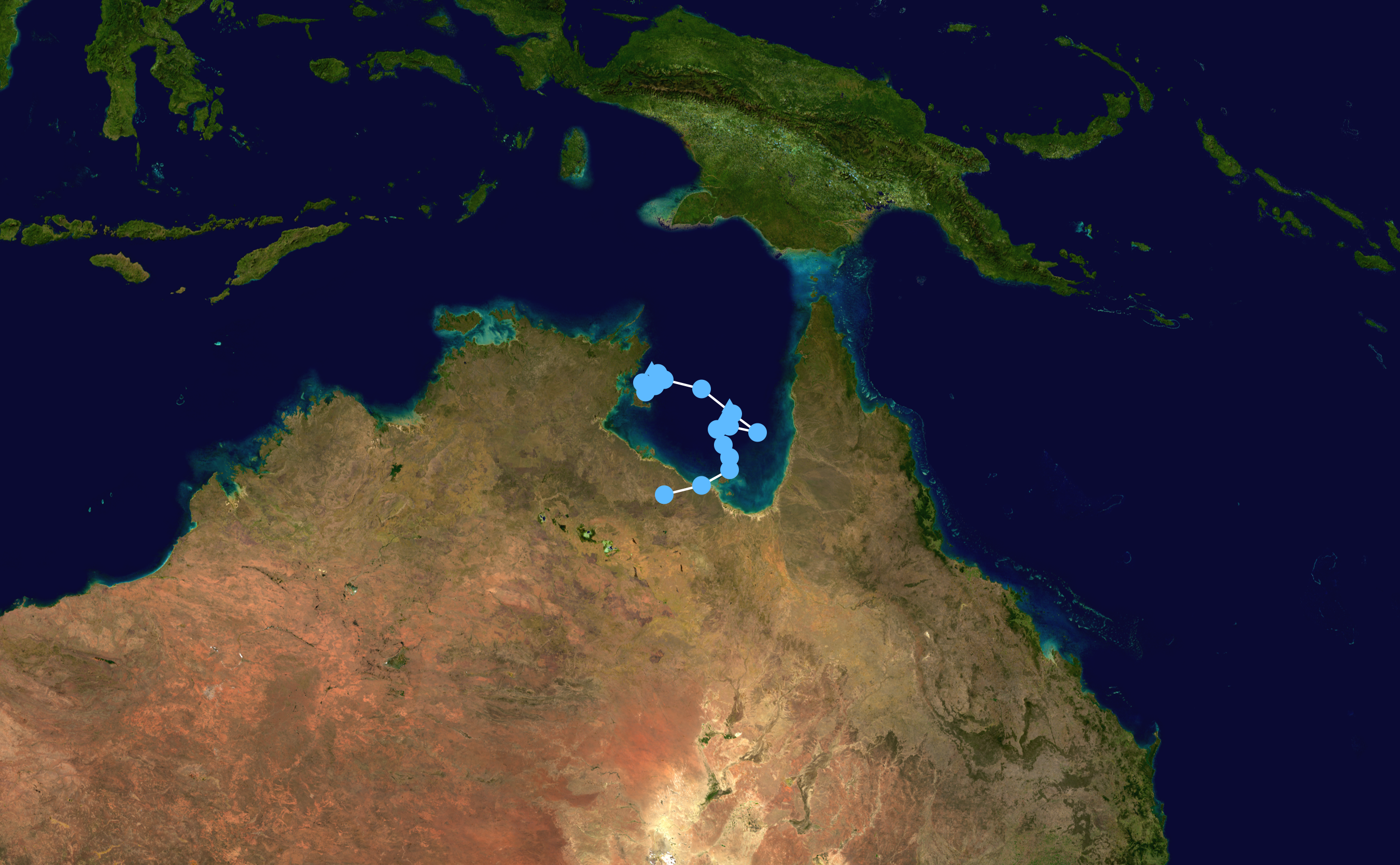
- Duration: 11 February – 17 February
- Peak intensity: 45 km/h (30 mph) (10-min); 997 hPa (mbar)

On 11 February, the BoM reported that Tropical Low 15U was forming over the eastern Top End. The JTWC had also begun monitoring the disturbance, which the agency classified it by the code identifier Invest 91P, and gave it a low chance for development. The next day, the JTWC later upgraded the system's chance for development to medium. The BoM later assessed 15U to still be a weak tropical low, and gave it a low chance for development. The low then moved slowly southeastwards, before moving inland on 16 February and being last noted on the BoM's tropical cyclone outlooks by the next day.

=== Tropical Low 16U ===
- Tropical low (Australian scale)
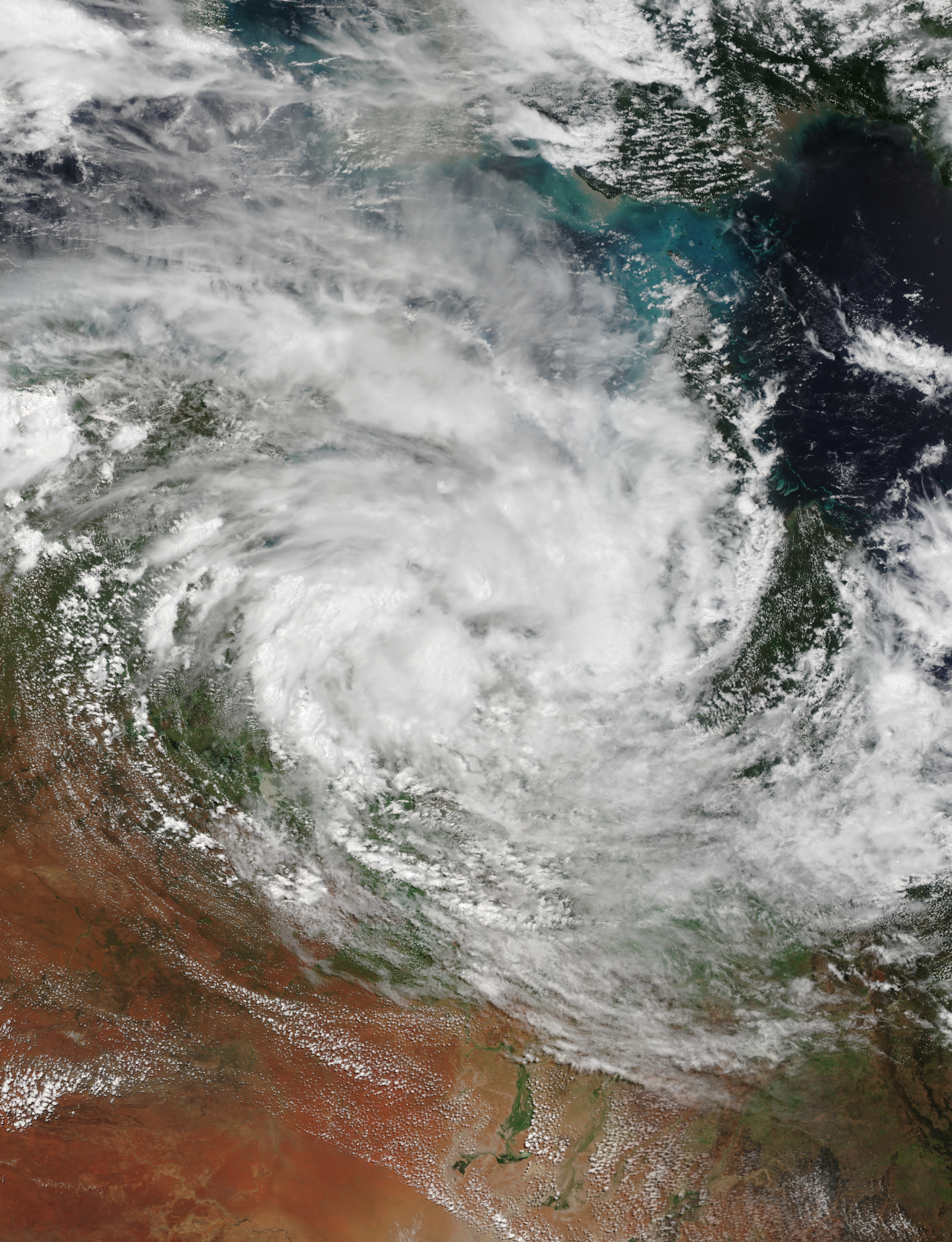
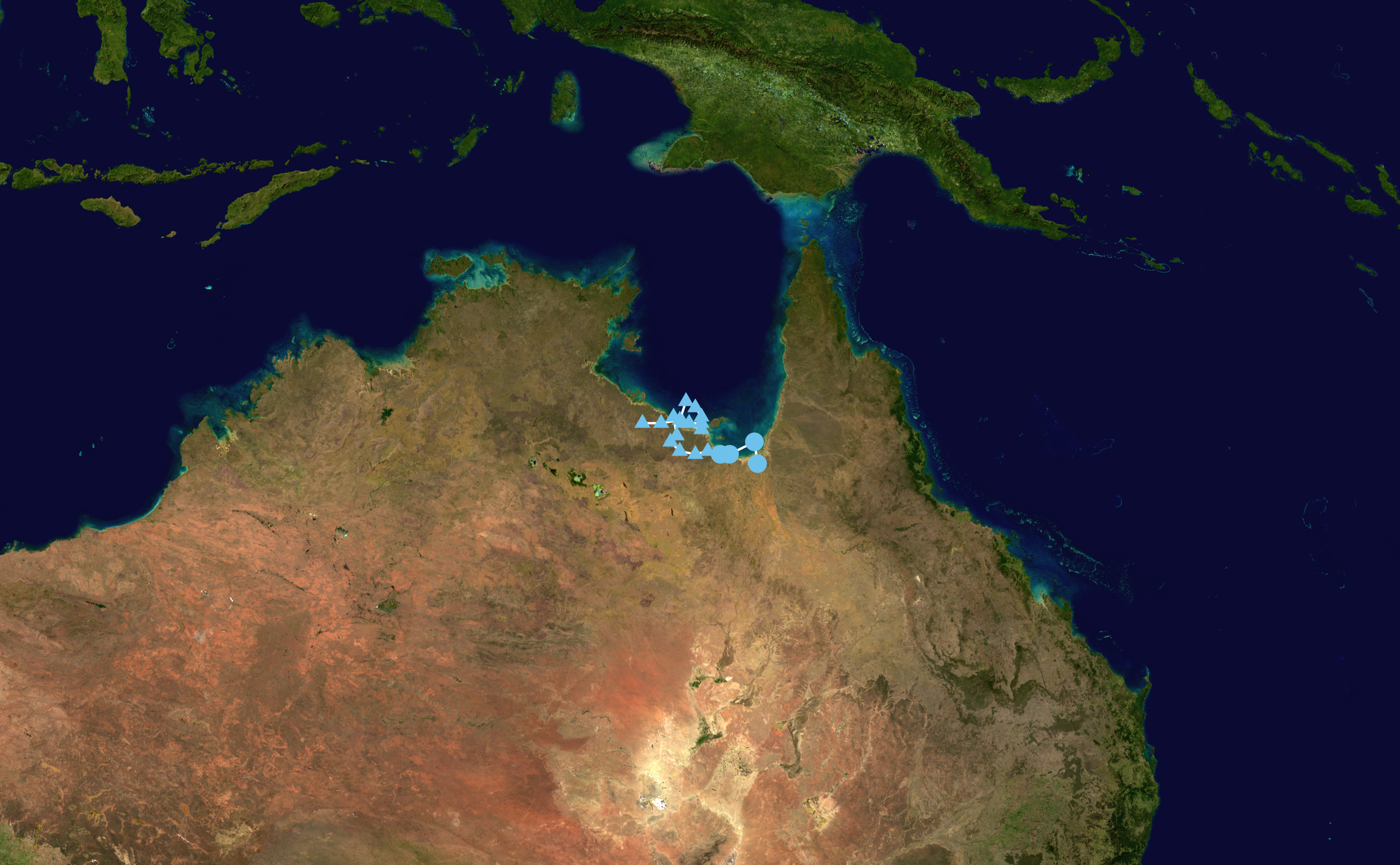
- Duration: 22 February – 10 March
- Peak intensity: 75 km/h (45 mph) (10-min); 994 hPa (mbar)

On 22 February, Tropical Low 16U formed to the north of Port Hedland and slowly drifted northeast. Even though the low did not intensify into a tropical cyclone, Troughton Island briefly experienced gales on 27 February in the late afternoon and early evening. Over the Kimberley and into the Northern Territory, the low kept moving east. The low traveled in the Northern Territory. During 5–6 March, the low traveled over the Gulf of Carpentaria, and on the next day, it returned to land over northwestern Queensland. The system finally dissipated on 10 March.

The main highway connecting Western Australia and the Northern Territory was closed due to flooding caused by heavy rains in rivers and on roadways. Due to the flooding of homes and essential services, around 700 people were initially displaced from numerous towns in the Northern Territory; 300 of these people were affected for more than a month. Record-breaking flooding in northwest Queensland led to evacuations and severely inundated numerous rural residences as well as certain towns, including Burketown, Urandangi, and Camooweal. The media covered the enormous road and property damage, as well as the massive cattle losses, that occurred in the area.

=== Tropical Low 17U ===
- Tropical low (Australian scale)
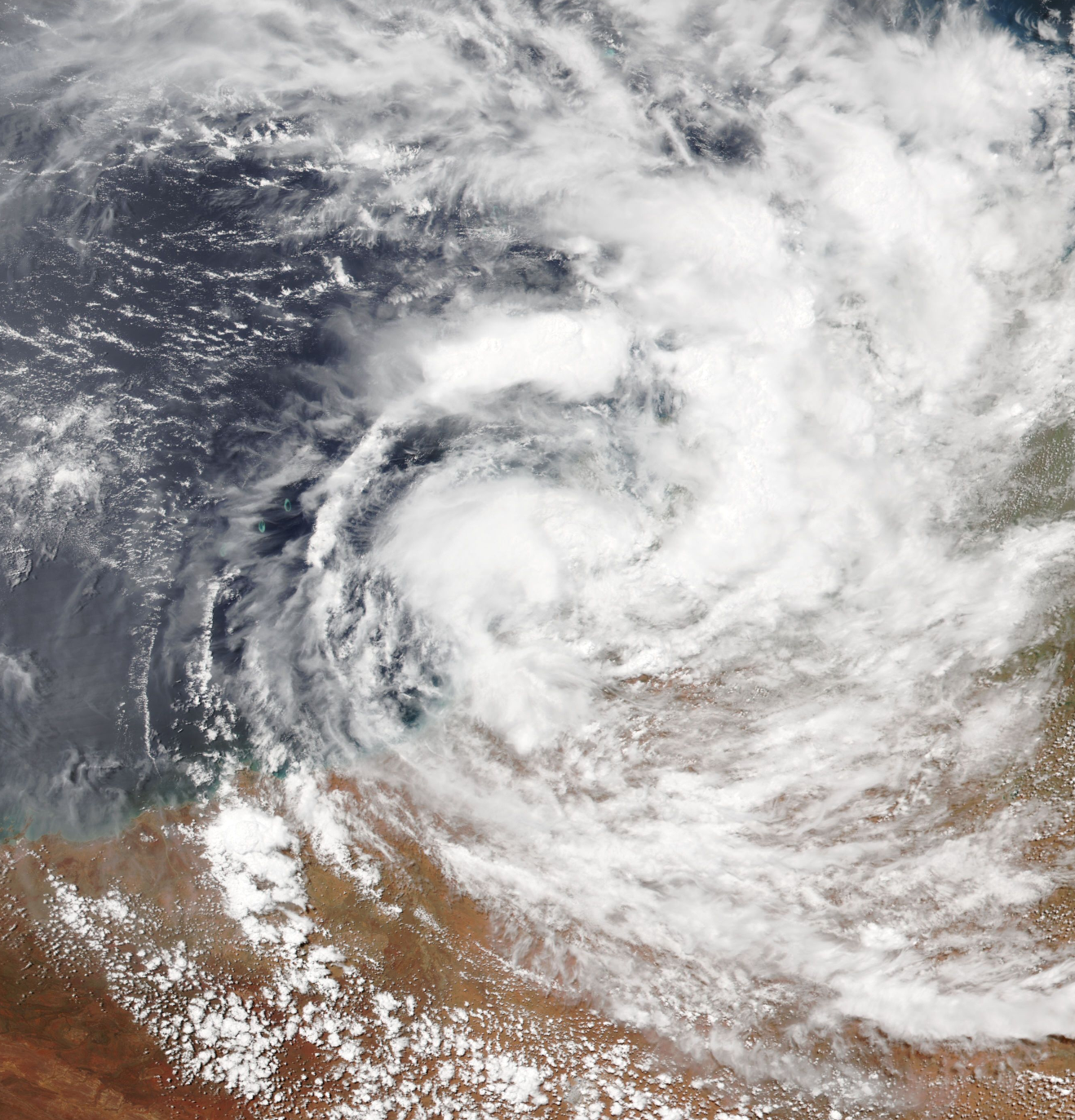
- Duration: 24 February – 27 February
- Peak intensity: Winds not specified; 999 hPa (mbar)

On 24 February, the BoM reported that a weak tropical low which they classified as 17U was located over land to the south of the Joseph Bonaparte Gulf. 17U was last noted on 27 February.

=== Tropical Low 18U (Kevin) ===
- Tropical low (Australian scale)
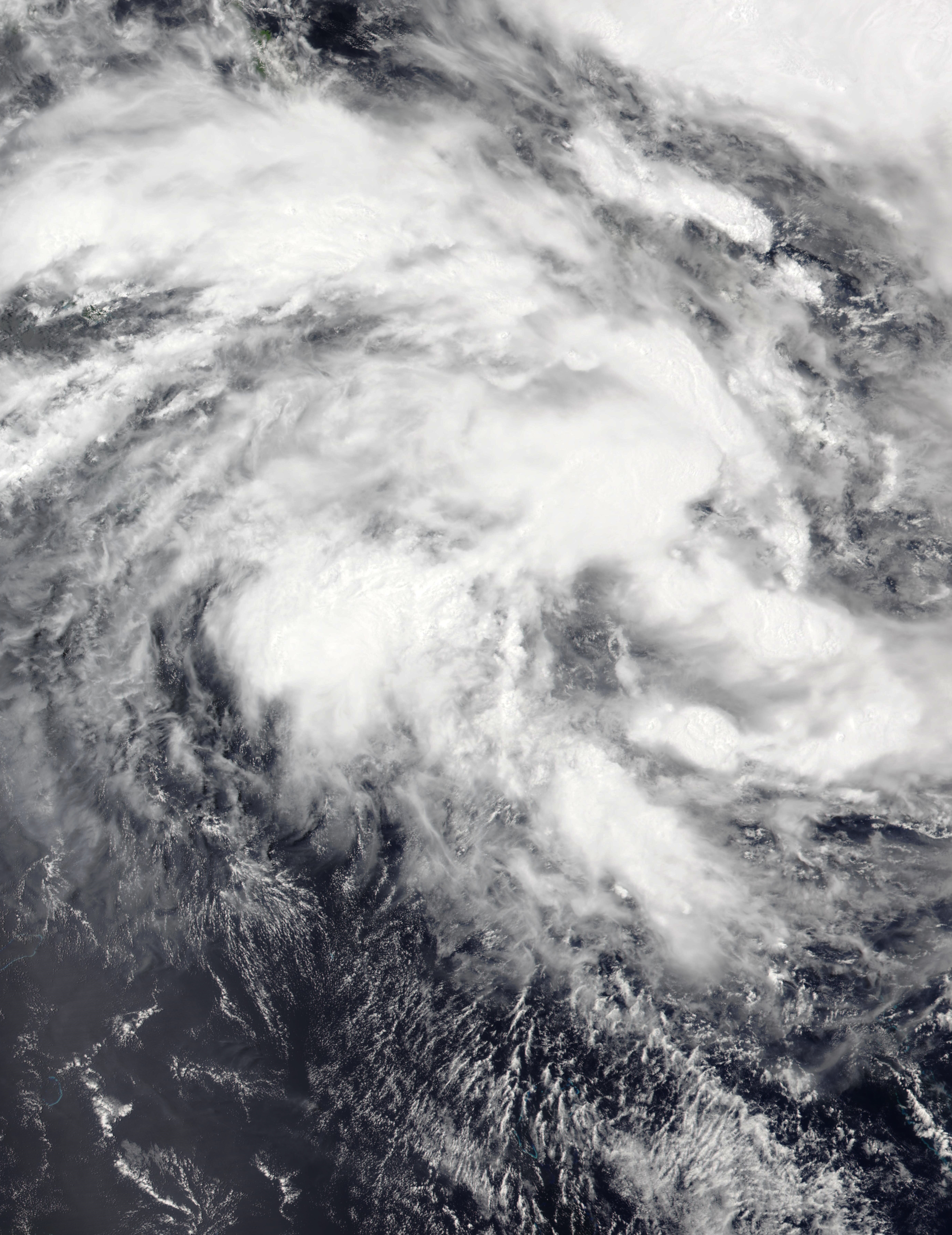
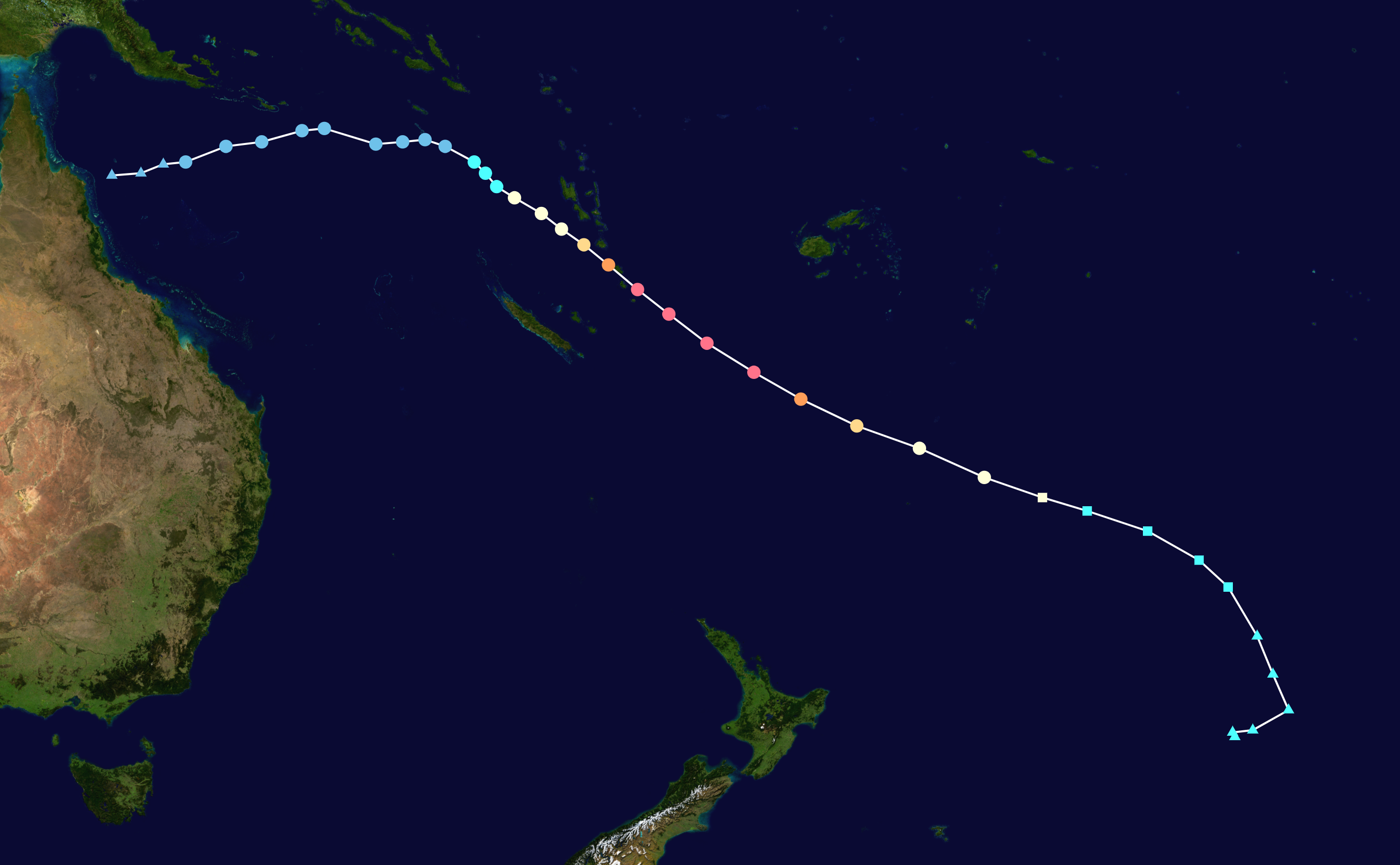
- Duration: 27 February – 1 March (Exited basin)
- Peak intensity: 55 km/h (35 mph) (10-min); 996 hPa (mbar)

On 27 February, a weak tropical low formed off the coast in Queensland. The BoM designated it as 18U. The JTWC began monitoring the tropical low and setting the chance of tropical cyclone development as low. On 1 March, the JTWC issued a TCFA on the system due to the system having much improved structure. The tropical low entered the South Pacific basin the same day where it became designated as Tropical Depression 09F by the FMS.

=== Tropical Low 20U ===
- Tropical low (Australian scale)
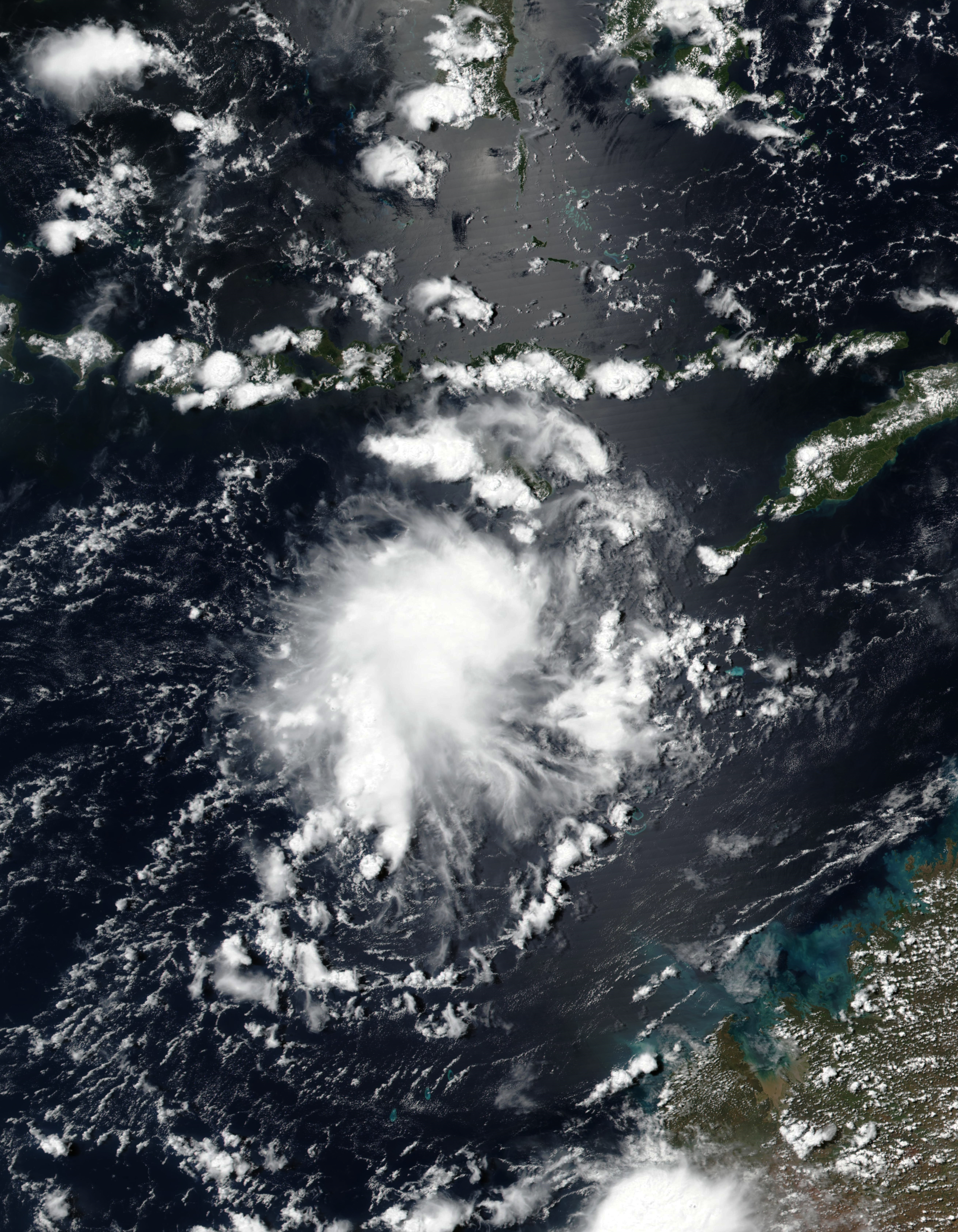
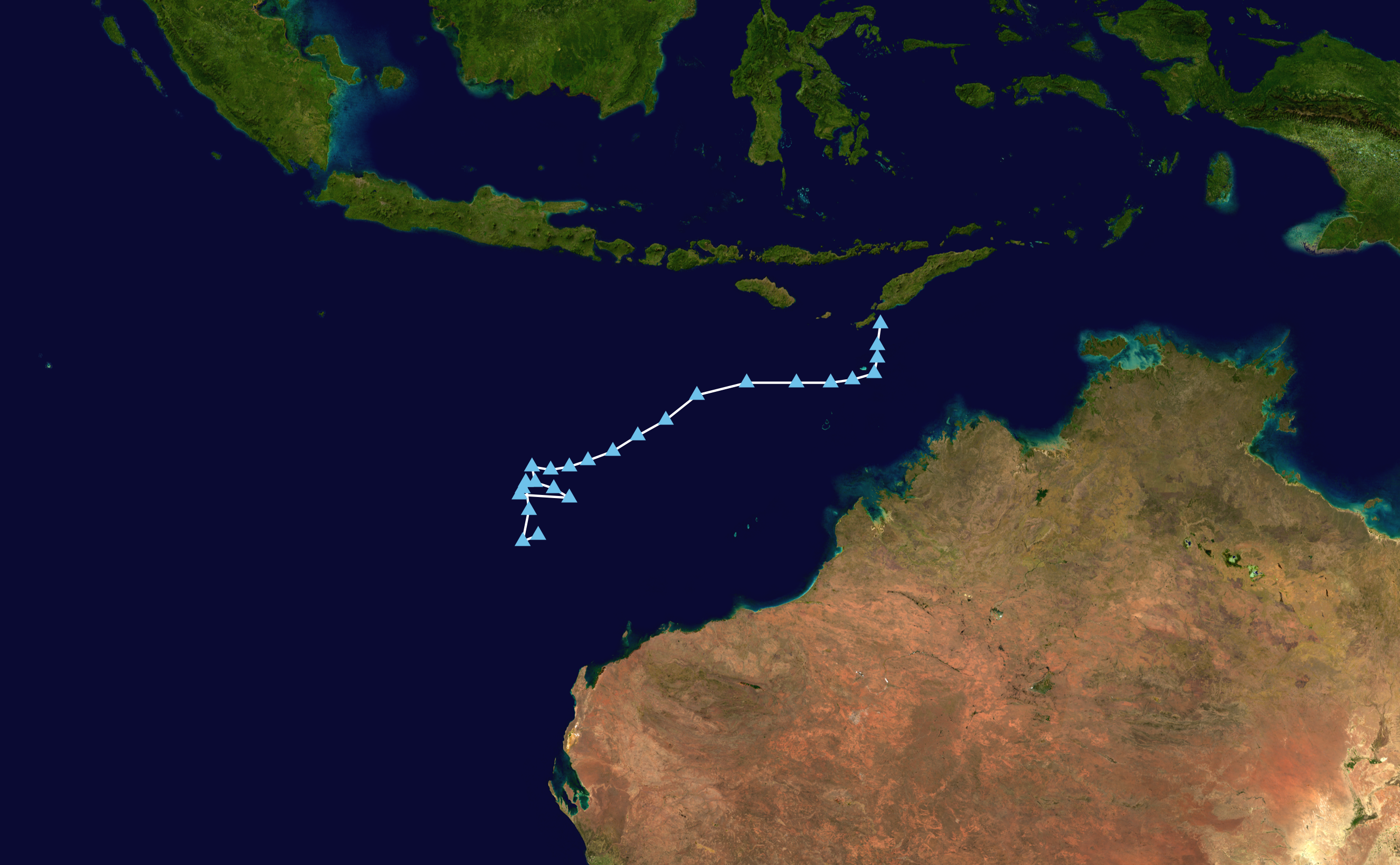
- Duration: 25 March – 30 March
- Peak intensity: Winds not specified; 1005 hPa (mbar)

A tropical low formed on 25 March near East Timor. It headed generally southwestward before dissipating on 30 March.

=== Severe Tropical Cyclone Herman ===
- Category 5 severe tropical cyclone (Australian scale)
- Category 4 tropical cyclone (SSHWS)
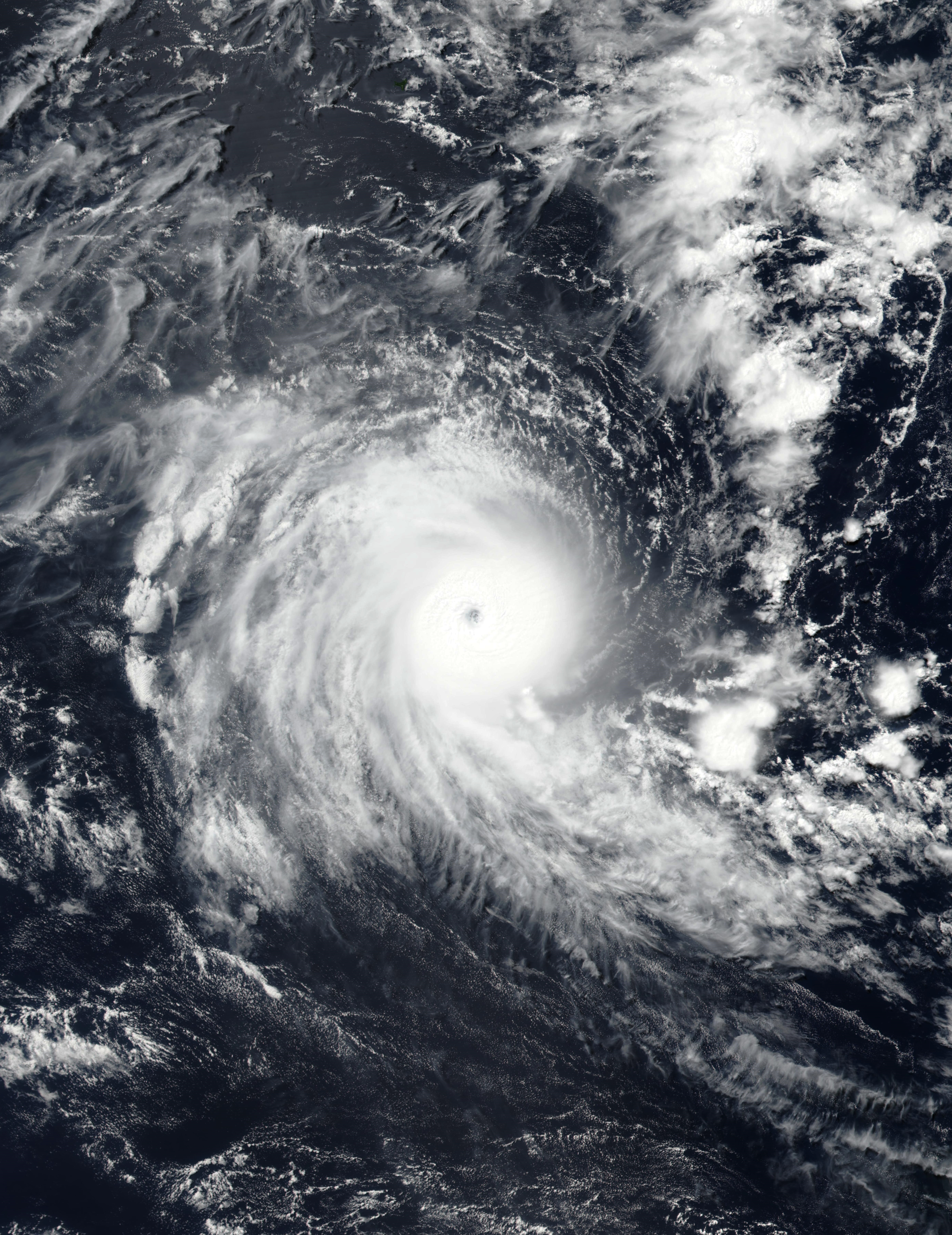
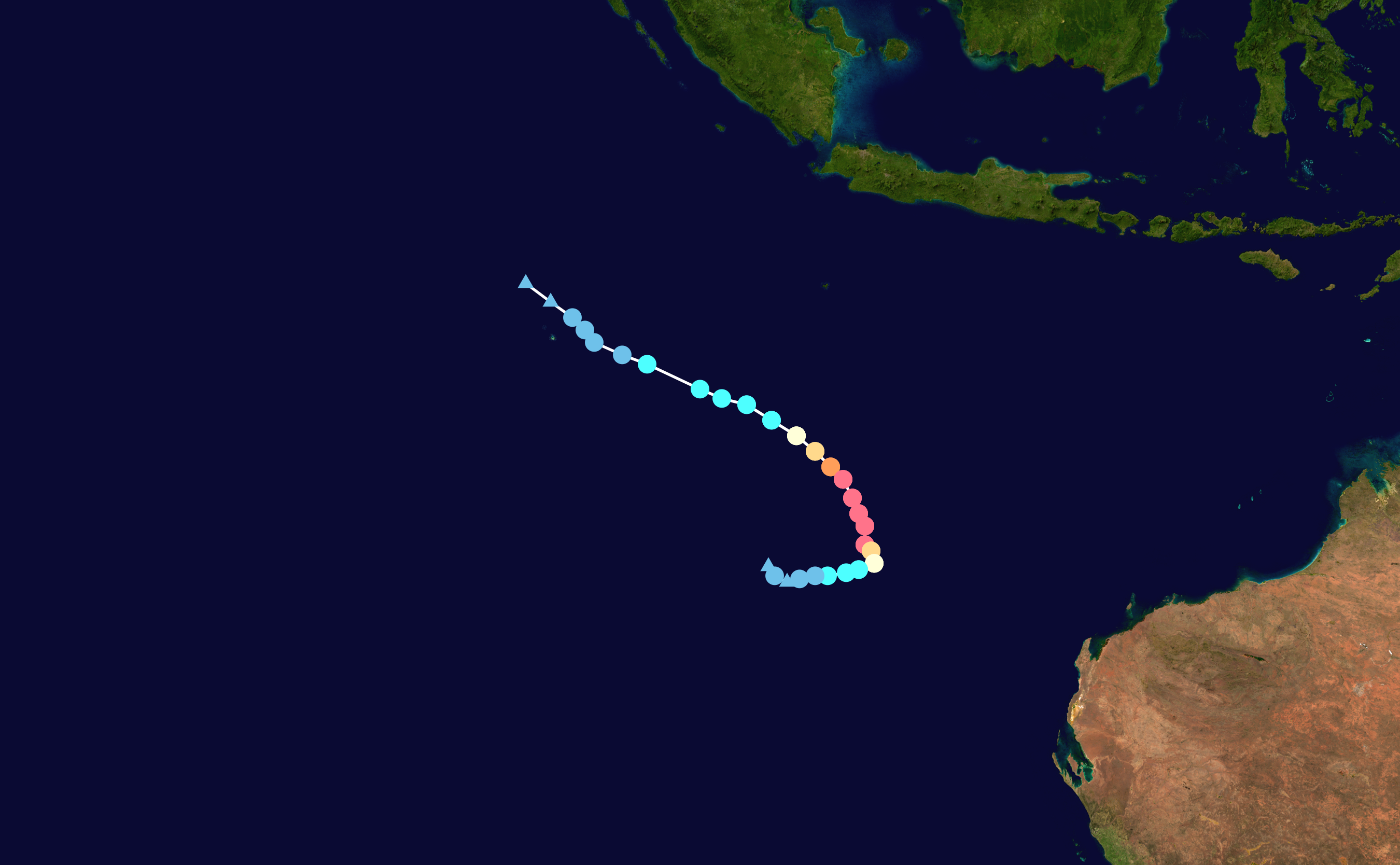
- Duration: 28 March – 4 April
- Peak intensity: 215 km/h (130 mph) (10-min); 930 hPa (mbar)

On 28 March, a weak tropical low formed to the north of the Cocos Islands and traveled southeast over open seas. Satellite imagery showed that flaring convection which was circulating over the obscured LLCC. Later the next day, the JTWC issued a TCFA, and upgraded the system to a Tropical Cyclone 17S. Later that day, the BoM reported that the tropical low had developed into a Category 1 tropical cyclone on the Australian scale and named it Herman. Later, the BoM's assessed the cyclone to have strengthened into a Category 2 tropical cyclone with 10-minute sustained winds of 95 km/h (60 mph). Herman intensified further with an eye feature starting to appear on microwave imagery. Multispectral animated satellite imagery revealed an exposed LLCC with deep convection persisting along the western periphery of the LLCC and reaching 1-minute maximum sustained winds of 130 km/h (80 mph). Herman had further intensified to a Category 4 cyclone with a well-defined eye.

Continuing to rapidly intensify, Herman then strengthened into a Category 5 severe tropical cyclone, with 10-minute average winds of 215 km/h (130 mph). Herman saw less favorable conditions on 1 April after peaking on 31 March as dry air was swallowed into the circulation. Herman was highly compact, with a distinct eye surrounded by cold cloud tops. The storm continued to weaken, the BoM's estimated winds of 195 km/h (120 mph). Herman became increasingly ragged and elongated as deep convection diminished and started to become displaced. During 2 April, while continuing to weaken, both the BoM and JTWC ceased issuing advisories. By this time, the system had turned west and was dissipating over the open waters of the Indian Ocean on 4 April.

=== Tropical Low 22U ===
- Tropical low (Australian scale)
- Duration: 30 March – 2 April

On 30 March, the BoM reported that Tropical Low 22U had formed over the northern Arafura Sea. The system remained weak as it moved west-southwest, before degenerating on 2 April.

=== Severe Tropical Cyclone Ilsa ===
- Category 5 severe tropical cyclone (Australian scale)
- Category 5 tropical cyclone (SSHWS)
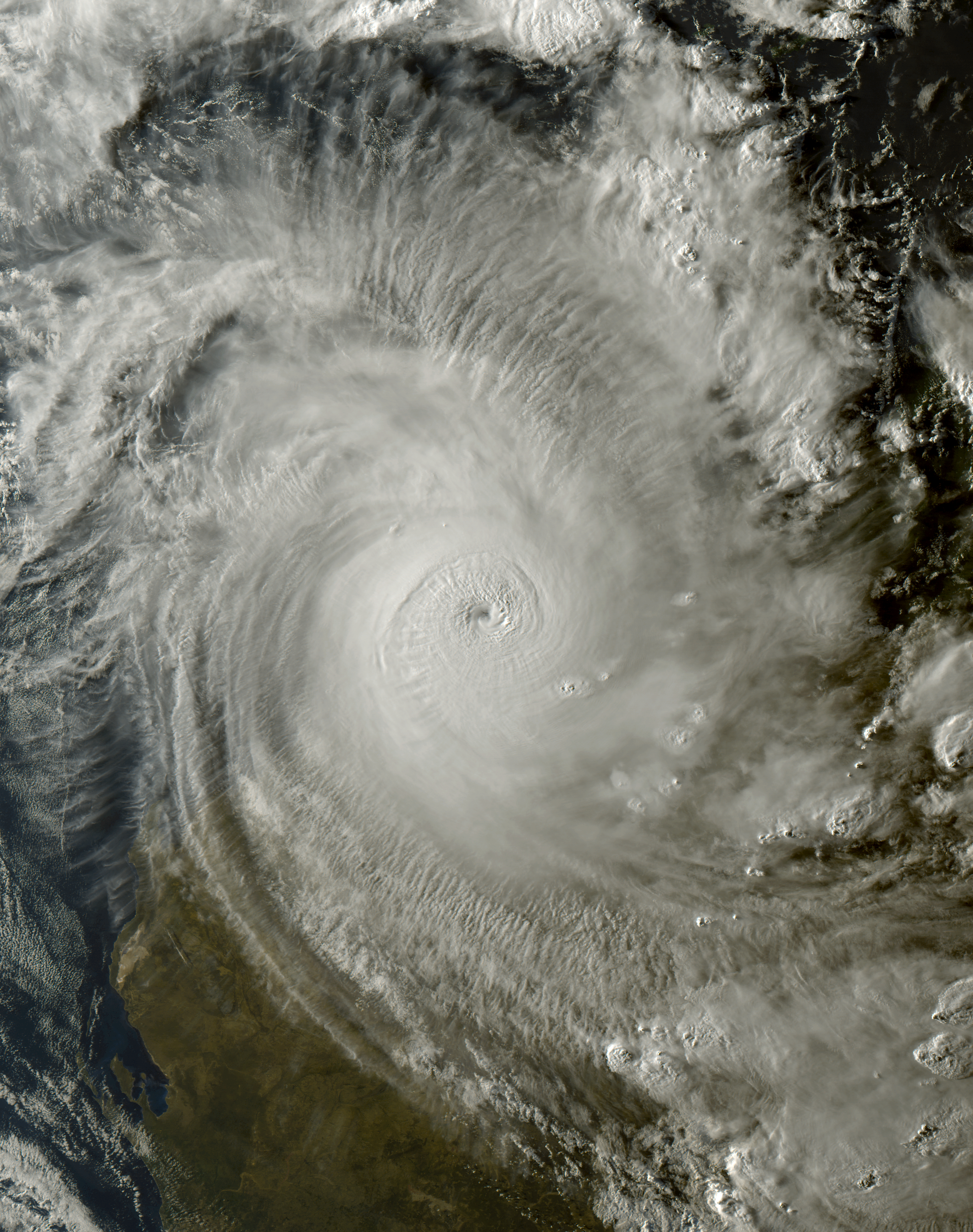
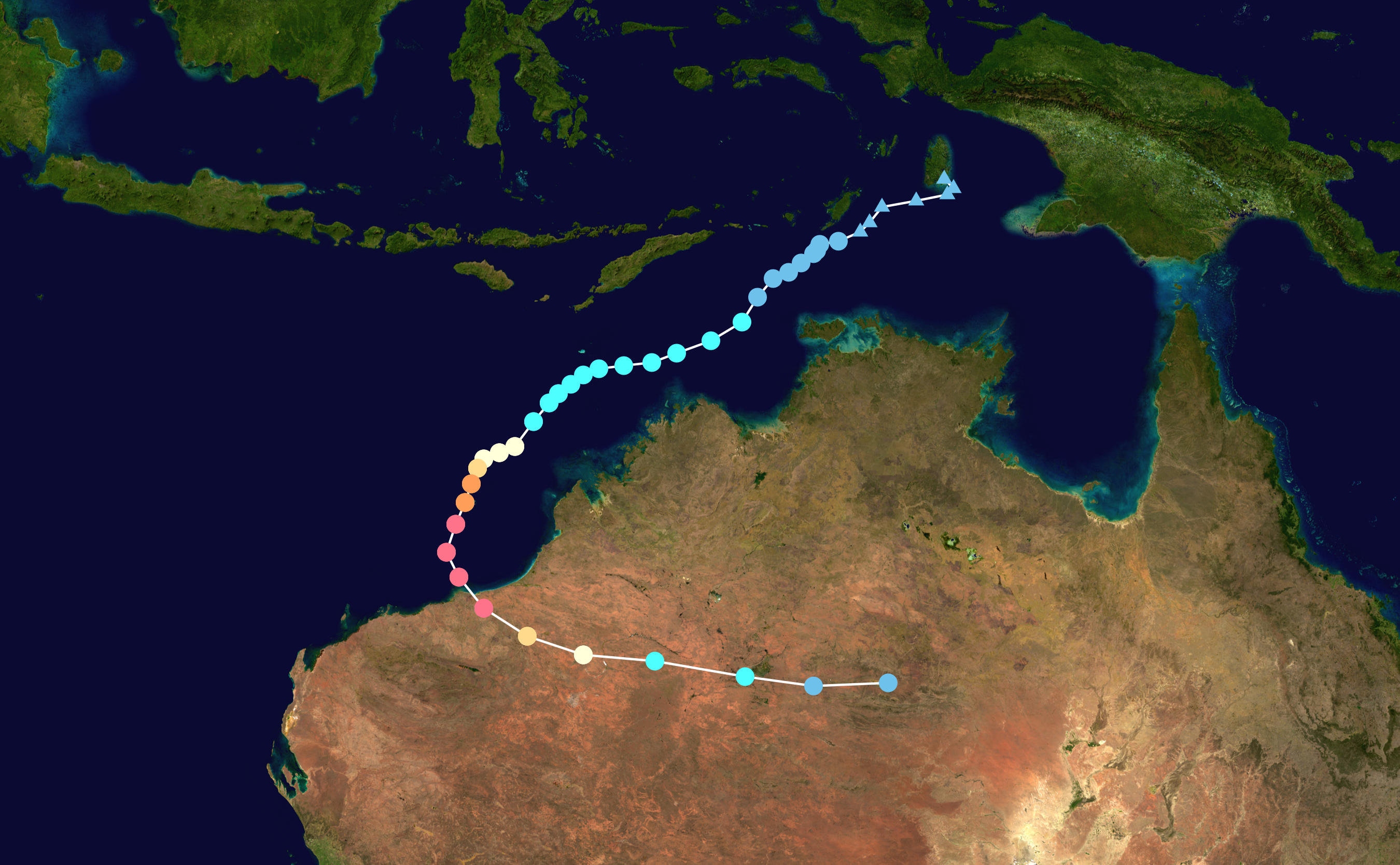
- Duration: 6 April – 15 April
- Peak intensity: 230 km/h (145 mph) (10-min); 930 hPa (mbar)

On 6 April, a tropical low formed in the Timor Sea as a result of an active burst of the monsoon trough. The JTWC later issued a TCFA on the next day. During the following day, the JTWC initiated advisories on the system and classified it as Tropical Cyclone 18S. The low drifted slowly southwest during the next several days, although development was delayed by unfavorable environmental condition. When conditions improved, the low developed into a Category 1 tropical cyclone and was named Ilsa. The next day, it intensified into a Category 3 severe tropical cyclone while also being upgraded to a Category 2-equivalent tropical cyclone on the SSHWS.

Later the next day, the BoM assessed the storm to have attained ten-minute sustained winds of 165 km/h (105 mph), ranking it as a Category 4-cyclone. On 13 April, the JTWC also assessed Ilsa to have attained an intensity equivalent to a Category 4-equivalent tropical cyclone on the Saffir–Simpson hurricane scale. Later that day, Ilsa strengthened further to its peak intensity as a Category 5-equivalent tropical cyclone with 1-minute sustained winds of 260 km/h (160 mph). An automated weather station on Rowley Shoals recorded wind gusts up to 235 km/h (146 mph).

Later that same day, Ilsa had become a Category 5 severe tropical cyclone with sustained winds of 205 km/h (125 mph). A record-breaking ten-minute sustained wind speed of 218 km/h (135 mph) was measured at Bedout Island, beating the previous record of Cyclone George in 2007. The cyclone crossed the coast about 120 km (75 mi) northeast of Port Hedland on 16:00 UTC, with sustained winds of 215 km/h (130 mph). Shortly after the landfall, the JTWC discontinued warnings on the system. While over Western Australia, Ilsa weakened to a low-end tropical cyclone with 175 km/h (110 mph) winds. Ilsa was last noted on 15 April.

=== Other systems ===
- On 15 November, the BoM reported a weak tropical low, 03U, near southern Indonesia. The JTWC released a TCFA stating that the low could intensify soon and called it Invest 94S. The next day, the JTWC canceled its TCFA and lowered its chances to low. It continued to move eastwards before being last noted on 24 November.
- On 30 November, the BoM reported that a weak tropical low had developed along a trough over central Gulf of Carpentaria. It generally moved southeast before being last noted by BoM on 2 December, near the western Cape York Peninsula.
- On 13 January, the BoM noted the potential of a tropical low forming in the eastern Coral Sea. By the next day, the Fiji Meteorological Service (FMS) designated the potential low as Tropical Disturbance 05F, while it was still in the BoM's area of responsibility. 05F briefly entered the South Pacific basin on 15 January, before subsequently moving back into the region late by the same day. On 16 January, the BoM upgraded 05F into a weak tropical low. The JTWC issued a TCFA on the system on 17 January, stating its chance to develop into a tropical cyclone was high. Later that day, it exited the basin again and moved into the South Pacific basin.
- On 15 January, the BoM noted the potential of another tropical low forming, this time in the northern Coral Sea, within a monsoon trough that was expected to form. Two days later, the agency reported that the tropical low had formed, and gave it a high chance of developing into a tropical cyclone within the basin. The JTWC subsequently issued a TCFA the next day. Continuing southeastwards, the tropical low then exited the basin and into the South Pacific basin on 20 January, where it was immediately designated as Tropical Depression 06F by the FMS.
- On 17 February, the BoM reported that a weak tropical low had formed within a trough, south of Indonesia. It was last noted the next day.
- On 30 April, a weak tropical low southeast of Christmas Island was noted by the BoM in their daily bulletins. Environmental conditions were not favorable for further development of the low as it tracked westward. The tropical low was last noted to have weakened into the trough on 2 May.

== Storm names ==
=== Bureau of Meteorology ===
The Australian Bureau of Meteorology (TCWC Melbourne) monitors all tropical cyclones that form within the Australian region, including any within the areas of responsibility of TCWC Jakarta or TCWC Port Moresby. Should a tropical low reach tropical cyclone strength within the BoM's area of responsibility, it will be assigned the next name from the following naming list. The names Darian and Herman were used for the first time this season, after replacing Dominic and Hamish respectively, from the 2008–09 season. The names that were used for 2022–23 season are listed below:

- Darian
- Ellie
- Freddy
- Gabrielle
- Herman
- Ilsa

=== TCWC Jakarta ===
TCWC Jakarta monitors all tropical cyclones active from the Equator to 11S and from 90E to 145E. Should a tropical depression intensify into a tropical cyclone within TCWC Jakarta's Area of Responsibility, it will be assigned the next name from the following list. For the first time since the 2016–17 season, no names were used.

- Anggrek (unused)
- Bakung (unused)
- Cempaka (unused)
- Dahlia (unused)
- Flamboyan (unused)
- Lili (unused)

=== TCWC Port Moresby ===
Tropical cyclones that develop north of 11°S between 151°E and 160°E are assigned names by the Tropical Cyclone Warning Centre in Port Moresby, Papua New Guinea. Tropical cyclone formation in this area is rare, with no cyclones being named in it since 2007. As names are assigned in a random order, the whole list is shown below:

- Hibu (unused)
- Ila (unused)
- Kama (unused)
- Lobu (unused)
- Maila (unused)
- Alu (unused)
- Buri (unused)
- Dodo (unused)
- Emau (unused)
- Fere (unused)

=== Retirement ===
Later in 2023, the World Meteorological Organisations RA V Tropical Cyclone Committee retired the names Gabrielle and Ilsa, replacing them with the names Gemm and Isabella respectively, due to the damage caused by both systems in Western Australia and the South Pacific. The name Freddy was also removed from the rotating lists of Australian region cyclone names due to its devastating impacts in southern Africa. On August 5, 2025, during the 23rd session of the RA V Tropical Cyclone Committee, the name Frederic was chosen as a replacement.

== Season effects ==
2022–23 Australian region cyclone season
Name	Dates	Peak intensity			Areas affected	Damage (US$)	Deaths
Name	Dates	Category	Wind speed (km/h (mph))	Pressure (hPa)	Areas affected	Damage (US$)	Deaths
01U	26–31 Jul	Category 1 tropical cyclone	85 (50)	993	Cocos Islands	None	0
02U	1–5 Nov	Tropical low	Not specified	1004	None	None	0
03U	15–26 Nov	Tropical low	Not specified	1004	Christmas Island	None	0
TL	30 Nov – 2 Dec	Tropical low	Not specified	1001	Cape York Peninsula	None	0
Darian	13–21 Dec	Category 5 severe tropical cyclone	230 (145)	915	Cocos Islands	None	0
Ellie	21 Dec – 8 Jan	Category 1 tropical cyclone	75 (45)	990	Northern Territory, Western Australia	215 million	0
Hale	6–7 Jan	Tropical low	65 (40)	994	None	None	0
Irene	16–17 Jan	Tropical low	Not specified	999	None	None	0
06F	18–20 Jan	Tropical low	Not specified	996	None	None	0
10U	22–26 Jan	Tropical low	Not specified	1001	Northern Territory	None	0
Dingani	3–9 Feb	Tropical low	55 (35)	997	Cocos Islands	None	0
12U	31 Jan – 4 Feb	Tropical low	Not specified	1002	None	None	0
Freddy	4–14 Feb	Category 4 severe tropical cyclone	175 (110)	951	None	None	0
Gabrielle	6–10 Feb	Category 3 severe tropical cyclone	150 (90)	958	None	None	0
15U	11–17 Feb	Tropical low	45 (30)	997	Northern Territory	None	0
TL	17–18 Feb	Tropical low	Not specified	1004	None	None	0
16U	23 Feb – 10 Mar	Tropical low	75 (45)	994	Western Australia, Northern Territory	None	0
17U	24–27 Feb	Tropical low	Not specified	999	Northern Territory	None	0
Kevin	27 Feb – 1 Mar	Tropical low	55 (35)	996	Louisiade Archipelago	None	0
20U	25–30 Mar	Tropical low	Not specified	1005	None	None	0
Herman	28 Mar – 2 Apr	Category 5 severe tropical cyclone	215 (130)	930	Cocos Islands	None	0
22U	30 Mar – 2 Apr	Tropical low	Not specified	Not specified	None	None	0
Ilsa	5–16 Apr	Category 5 severe tropical cyclone	230 (145)	930	Maluku, Lesser Sunda Islands, Northern Territory, Western Australia	>10.2 million	0 (8)
TL	30 Apr – 2 May	Tropical low	Not specified	Not specified	Christmas Island	None	0
Season aggregates
25 systems	26 Jul – 2 May		230 (145)	915		>225 million	0 (8)

== See also ==
- Weather of 2022 and 2023
- List of Southern Hemisphere tropical cyclone seasons
- List of off-season Australian region tropical cyclones
- Tropical cyclones in 2022, 2023
- Atlantic hurricane seasons: 2022, 2023
- Pacific hurricane seasons: 2022, 2023
- Pacific typhoon seasons: 2022, 2023
- North Indian Ocean cyclone seasons: 2022, 2023
- 2022–23 South-West Indian Ocean cyclone season
- 2022–23 South Pacific cyclone season
