= Cyclones Judy and Kevin =

Two tropical cyclones brought impacts in Vanuatu and other regions

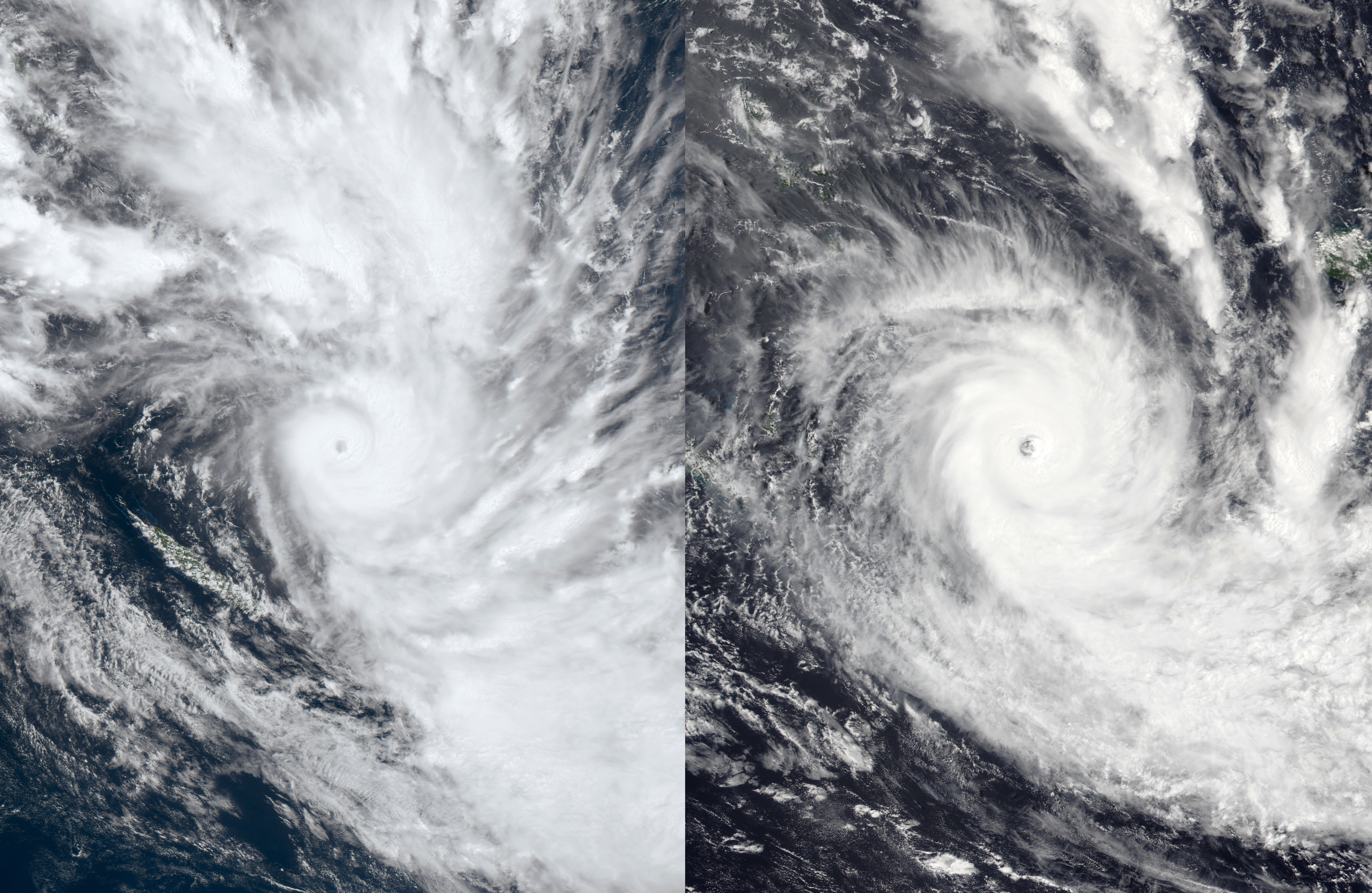
- Cyclones Judy (left) and Kevin (right) near their peak intensities on 1 March and 4 March respectively

Meteorological history
- as for Cyclone Judy
- Formed: 23 February 2023
- Subtropical: 3 March 2023
- Dissipated: 5 March 2023

Category 4 severe tropical cyclone
- 10-minute sustained (FMS)
- Highest winds: 185 km/h (115 mph)
- Lowest pressure: 940 hPa (mbar); 27.76 inHg

Category 3-equivalent tropical cyclone
- 1-minute sustained (SSHWS/JTWC)
- Highest winds: 205 km/h (125 mph)
- Lowest pressure: 941 hPa (mbar); 27.79 inHg

Meteorological history
- as for Cyclone Kevin
- Formed: 27 February 2023
- Subtropical: 6 March 2023
- Dissipated: 8 March 2023

Category 5 severe tropical cyclone
- 10-minute sustained (FMS)
- Highest winds: 230 km/h (145 mph)
- Lowest pressure: 913 hPa (mbar); 26.96 inHg

Category 4-equivalent tropical cyclone
- 1-minute sustained (SSHWS/JTWC)
- Highest winds: 250 km/h (155 mph)
- Lowest pressure: 918 hPa (mbar); 27.11 inHg

Overall effects
- Casualties: 1
- Damage: $433 million (2023 USD)
- Areas affected: Solomon Islands, Vanuatu, New Caledonia, Fiji
- IBTrACS: Judy, Kevin
- Part of the 2022–23 Australian region and South Pacific cyclone seasons

Severe Tropical Cyclones Judy and Kevin were a pair of intense tropical cyclones that made landfall on the Pacific island nation of Vanuatu within 48 hours of each other in March 2023. They were the fourth and fifth named storms of the 2022–23 South Pacific cyclone season respectively, as well as the second and third severe tropical cyclones of the season. By the end of February, Judy had affected the Solomon Islands, and shortly after, Kevin began to affect the country.

The origins of the tropical cyclones started with Judy forming as a tropical disturbance in the South Pacific basin southeast of Wallis and Futuna on 23 February. After continuous development from very warm sea surface temperatures, the system was classified as a tropical depression on the 26th by the Fiji Meteorological Service, shortly before the agency further upgraded its status to Category 1 the next day and assigned the name Judy to the storm. That same day, a tropical low in the Australian region formed northeast of Cooktown, Queensland. On 28 February, Judy made landfall in Efate in Vanuatu before rapidly intensifying to a Category 4 severe tropical cyclone on 1 March. The tropical low exited the region the same day, and entered the same basin as Judy, becoming marked as a tropical depression. The tropical depression strengthened and attained Category 1 strength and receive the name Kevin. Judy began to weaken from wind shear before transitioning to a subtropical cyclone, as Kevin began to also rapidly intensify from the warm waters and outflow. Kevin moved over Erromango and Tanna Island of Vanuatu on 3 March. Kevin became a Category 5 in the FMS scale on 4 March, before Kevin's structure began to rapidly degrade. Kevin underwent the same fate as Judy as it dissipated on 6 March. Kevin continued to degenerate, before its remnants were last marked on 12 March.

The nations were pounded by powerful winds and destructive seas. Vanuatu was heavily affected, being struck by both cyclones two days apart. The government asked Australia and New Zealand for aid shortly after Judy's passage. During 3 March, as Kevin was impacting the islands, a magnitude 6.5 earthquake hit just west of Espiritu Santo, and then a magnitude 5.5 earthquake aftershock hit the island shortly after. Nonetheless, no deaths or significant injuries have been reported in connection with either cyclone. Total damages from the two cyclones is estimated to reach 51.2 billion vatu (US$433 million).

== Meteorological history ==
=== Judy ===
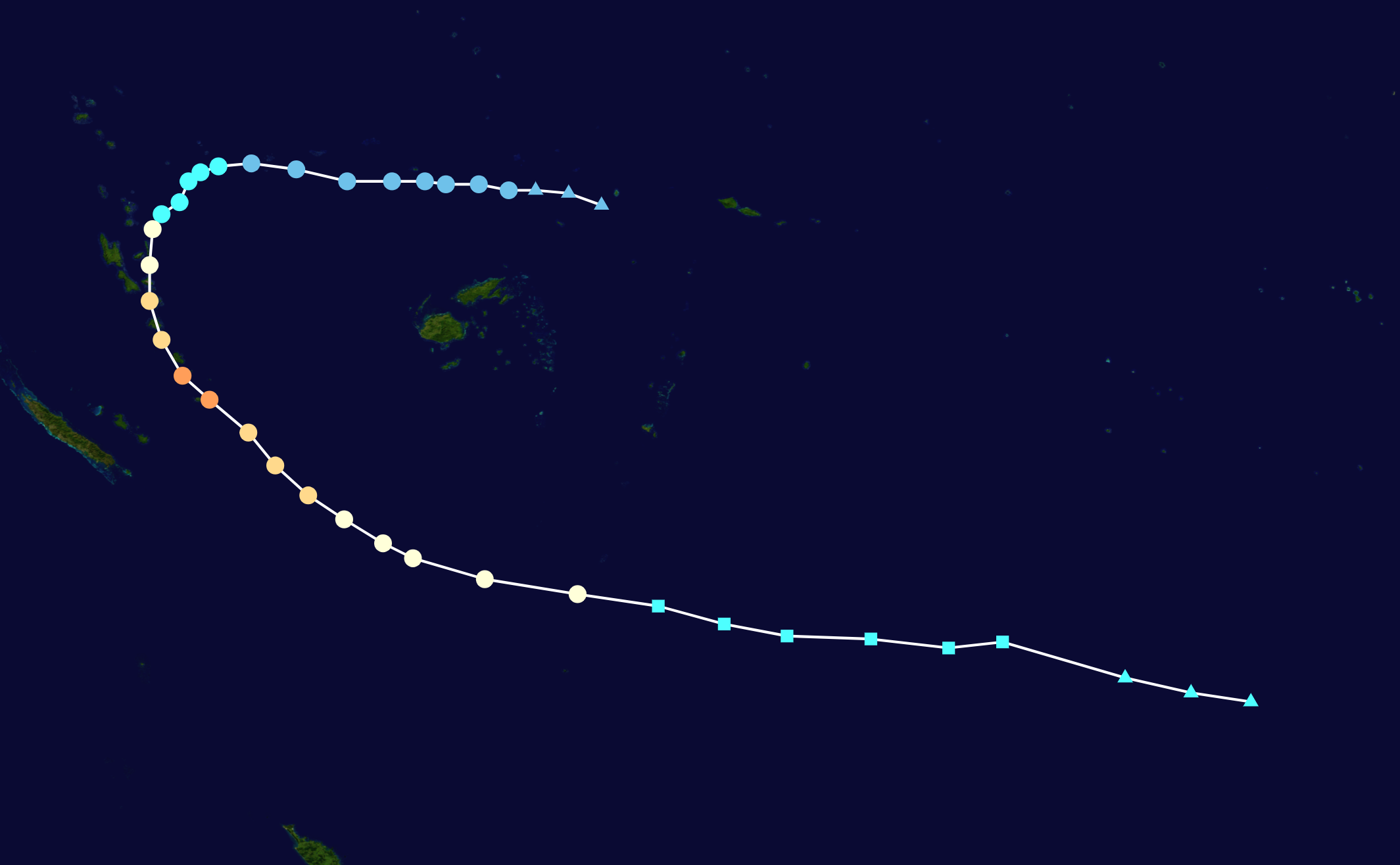
Map plotting the storm's track and intensity, according to the Saffir–Simpson scale Map key Saffir–Simpson scale Tropical depression (≤38 mph, ≤62 km/h) Tropical storm (39–73 mph, 63–118 km/h) Category 1 (74–95 mph, 119–153 km/h) Category 2 (96–110 mph, 154–177 km/h) Category 3 (111–129 mph, 178–208 km/h) Category 4 (130–156 mph, 209–251 km/h) Category 5 (≥157 mph, ≥252 km/h) Unknown Storm type Tropical cyclone Subtropical cyclone Extratropical cyclone, remnant low, tropical disturbance, or monsoon depression

On 23 February, the Fiji Meteorological Service (FMS) reported that Tropical Disturbance 08F had developed about 130 km (80 mi) to the southeast of Halalo in Wallis and Futuna. At this stage, the disturbance was poorly organised as the systems low-level circulation was fully exposed, while atmospheric convection was building over the circulation's northern and eastern quadrants. Over the next couple of days, the system slowly moved westwards and gradually consolidated within a marginal environment for tropical cyclogenesis, with very warm sea surface temperatures of 29–30 °C (84–86 °F) being offset by moderate to high levels of vertical wind shear.

During 26 February, as the disturbance continued to develop, the United States Joint Typhoon Warning Center (JTWC) issued a tropical cyclone formation alert (TCFA) on the system, while the FMS reported that 08F had developed into a tropical depression. At around 1100 VUT (00:00 UTC) on 27 February, the JTWC classified the depression as Tropical Cyclone 15P and initiated advisories on it, after they had received a bullseye ASCAT-B image which showed that winds of up to 65 km/h (40 mph) were occurring in the systems eastern quadrant. At around the same time, the FMS reported that the system had developed into a Category 1 tropical cyclone on the Australian tropical cyclone intensity scale and named it Judy, while it was located about 35 km (20 mi) to the southeast of Fatutaka in the Solomon Islands. The cyclone then began to consolidate, with deepening central convection as it moved southwestward under the influence of a subtropical ridge to its southeast.

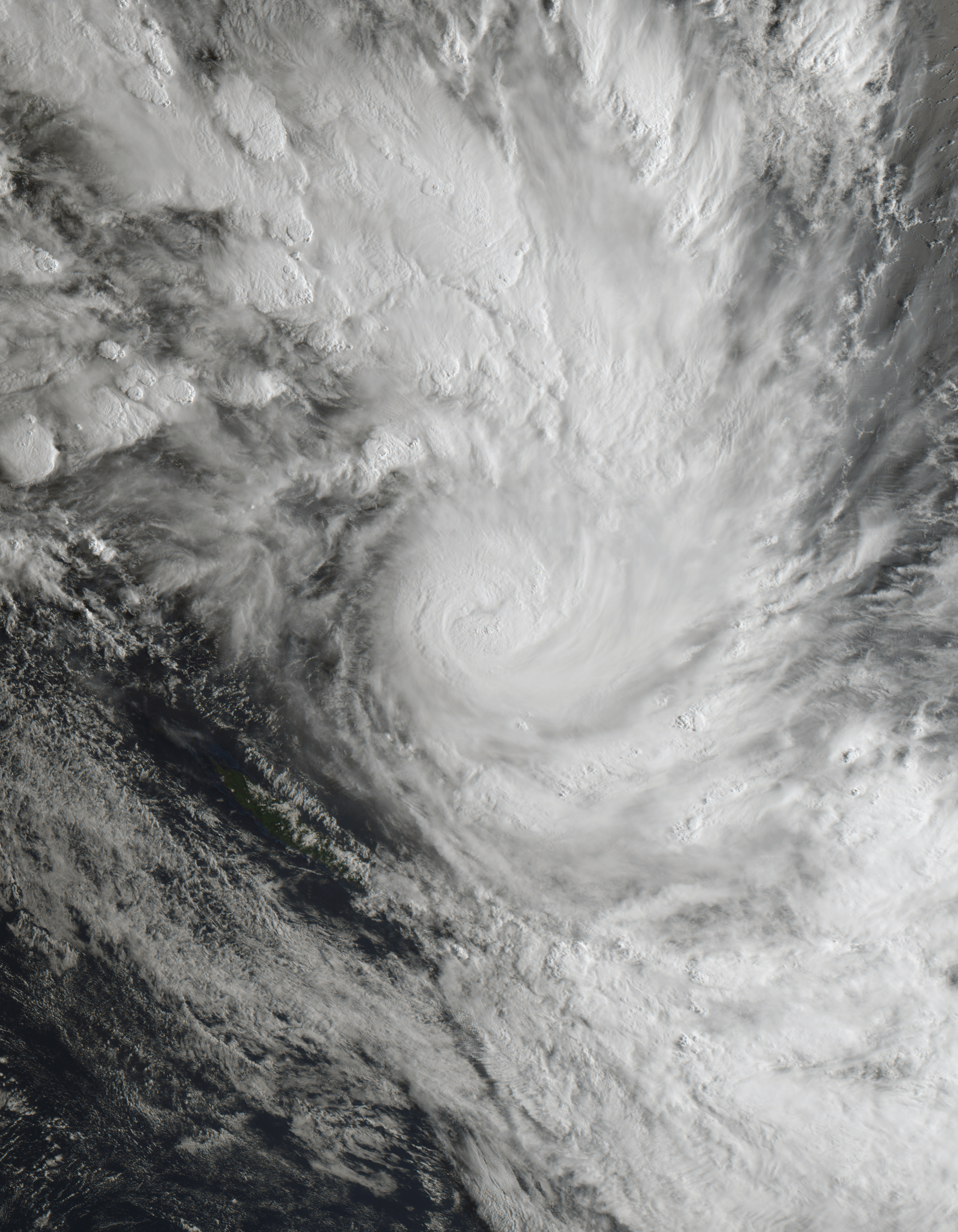
Cyclone Judy moving through Vanuatu on 28 February

By 09:00 UTC on 28 February, Judy had strengthened into a Category 1-equivalent tropical cyclone on the Saffir–Simpson hurricane wind scale (SSHWS). Judy further developed due to high sea surface temperatures of 30 °C (86 °F), leading to the FMS to upgrade its status to Category 2 tropical cyclone the same day, before upgrading further to a Category 3 severe tropical cyclone on 28 February. Continuing to rapidly intensify, Judy then strengthened into a Category 2-equivalent cyclone. At around 22:00 UTC that same day, Judy made landfall on the island of Efate in Vanuatu, with 1-minute sustained winds of 90–95 kn (165–175 km/h; 105–110 mph). On 1 March, the FMS reported that Judy had become a Category 4 severe tropical cyclone. The JTWC followed suit, upgrading the system to a Category 3-equivalent tropical cyclone. Judy then reached its peak intensity at 12:00 UTC that same day, with 10-minute sustained winds of 175 km/h (110 mph), and 1-minute sustained winds of 195 km/h (120 mph). However, increasing wind shear soon took a toll on the system, and by 2 March, the FMS reported that Judy's winds had bottomed to 150 km/h (90 mph), becoming a Category 3 severe tropical cyclone. At the same time, the JTWC downgraded the system to a Category 2-equivalent tropical cyclone.

Turning southeastward, Judy further weakened into a Category 1-equivalent tropical cyclone, as unfavorable environment that consisted of cooling sea surface temperatures and high wind shear unraveled the storm's central convection. At the same time, the FMS passed the responsibility of warning the system to the New Zealand MetService, as it left their area of responsibility. At 06:00 UTC the next day, the MetService downgraded Judy to a Category 2 tropical cyclone. Three hours later, the JTWC reclassified Judy as a subtropical system, noting its central convection had been severely sheared to the southeast, partially exposing its low-level circulation center, along with significant erosion of its western peripheries due to an intrusion of a mid-level trough to its southwest. The system was subsequently last noted by MetService on 5 March, while it was located about 1,500 km (930 mi) to the south-west of Tahiti in French Polynesia.

=== Kevin ===
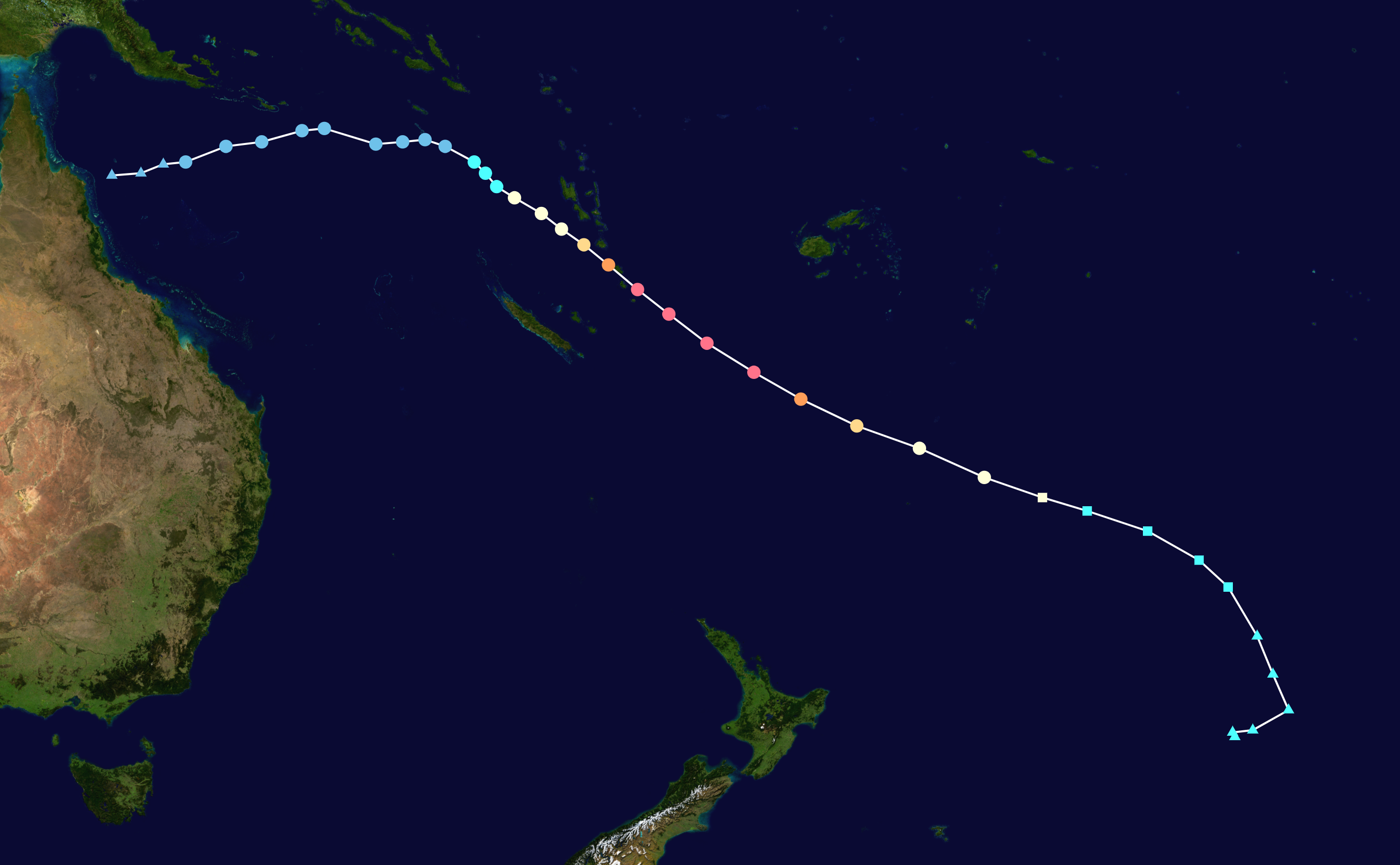
Map plotting the storm's track and intensity, according to the Saffir–Simpson scale Map key Saffir–Simpson scale Tropical depression (≤38 mph, ≤62 km/h) Tropical storm (39–73 mph, 63–118 km/h) Category 1 (74–95 mph, 119–153 km/h) Category 2 (96–110 mph, 154–177 km/h) Category 3 (111–129 mph, 178–208 km/h) Category 4 (130–156 mph, 209–251 km/h) Category 5 (≥157 mph, ≥252 km/h) Unknown Storm type Tropical cyclone Subtropical cyclone Extratropical cyclone, remnant low, tropical disturbance, or monsoon depression

On 27 February, the Australian Bureau of Meteorology (BoM) reported that Tropical Low 18U had developed off the coast of Queensland, Australia, about 450 km (280 mi) to the northeast of Cooktown. At this stage, atmospheric convection was flaring over the system's poorly organised low level circulation centre, while it was located within an area of environmental conditions which were becoming more favourable for tropical cyclogenesis. Over the next day, the system gradually developed further, as it moved north-eastwards and passed about 130 km (80 mi) to the southwest of Tagula Island in Papua New Guinea. The low subsequently started to move south-eastwards along the subtropical ridge of high pressure and passed near or over Rennell Island in the Solomon Islands on 1 March, as it moved into the Fiji Meteorological Service's (FMS) area of responsibility. Later that day, the United States Joint Typhoon Warning Center (JTWC) initiated advisories on the depression and designated it as Tropical Cyclone 16P, after the system's structure had significantly improved as convection wrapped into and consolidated over the low-level circulation. This was followed by the FMS who named the system Kevin, after it had become a Category 1 tropical cyclone on the Australian tropical cyclone intensity scale.

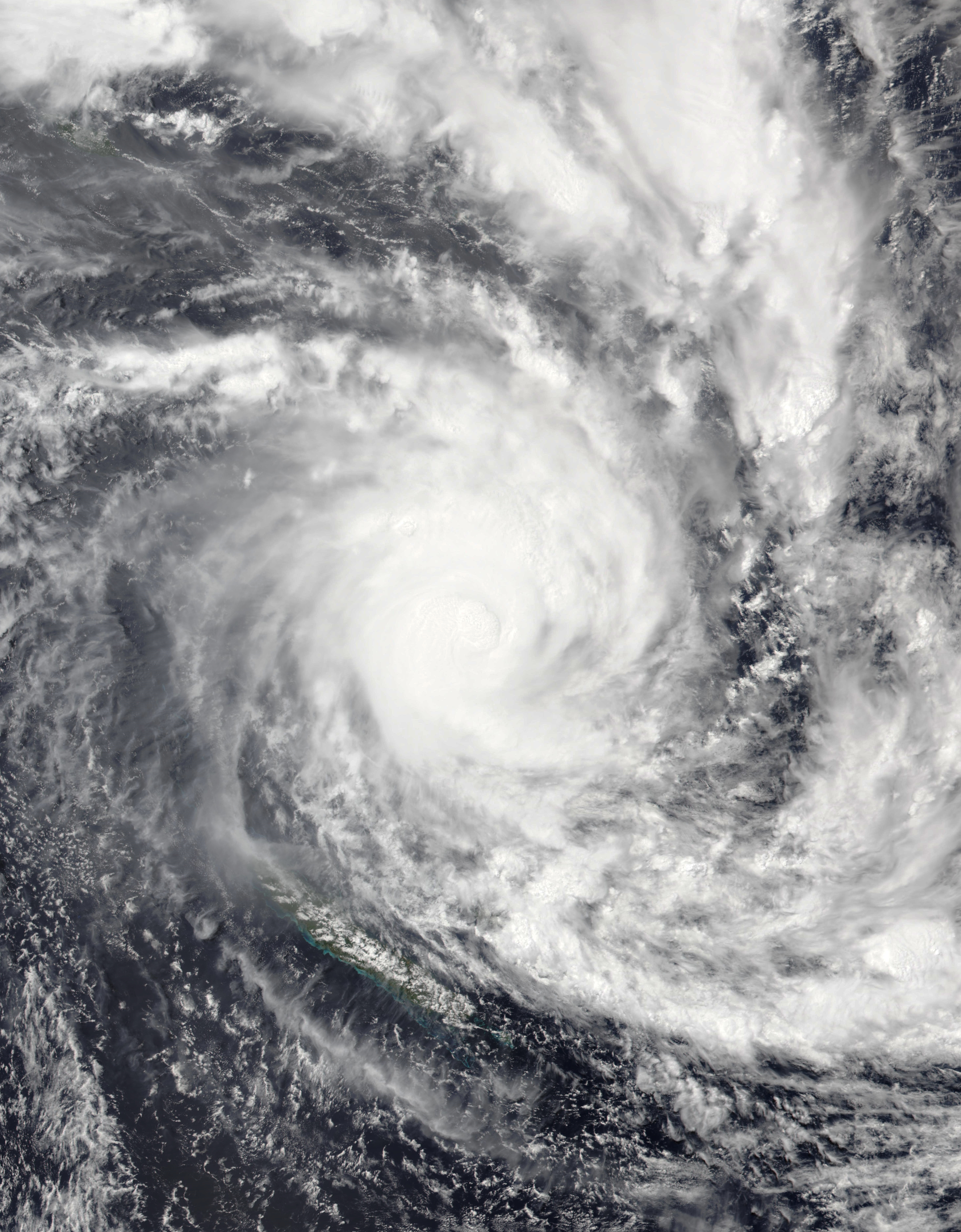
Cyclone Kevin approaching Vanuatu on 3 March

Throughout the following day, the newly named system moved south-eastwards and gradually intensified further, before it intensified into a Category 3 severe tropical cyclone, while it was located about 180 km (110 mi) to the southwest of Luganville in the island nation of Vanuatu. During 3 March, Kevin continued to intensify with an eye feature appearing on satellite imagery, before it passed very near or over the islands of Erromango and Tanna Island as a Category 4 severe tropical cyclone. After the system had moved back over open waters and away from Vanuatu, Kevin underwent a period of rapid intensification, before at 0000UTC on 4 March the JTWC reported that Kevin had peaked with 1-minute sustained winds of 250 km/h (155 mph), which made it equivalent to a category 4 hurricane on the SSHWS. Later that day the FMS followed suit and reported that Kevin had peaked as a Category 5 severe tropical cyclone with 10-minute sustained winds of 230 km/h (145 mph), as it passed about 700 km (435 mi) to the west of Noumea in New Caledonia.

At around 21:00 UTC on 4 March, the FMS reported that Kevin had weakened into a Category 4 severe tropical cyclone and passed the primary warning responsibility to MetService as it moved below 25S and out of its area of responsibility. However, cooling sea surface temperatures and increasing wind shear made the system weaken to a Category 4-equivalent tropical cyclone nine hours later, as the storm's structure began to unravel on satellite imagery. By 18:00 UTC that same day, the FMS downgraded Kevin to a Category 4 severe tropical cyclone, with the JTWC subsequently downgrading the system to a Category 3-equivalent tropical cyclone, noting the significant deterioration of its convective structure.

At the same time, the JTWC further downgraded Kevin to a Category 2-equivalent tropical cyclone, as it continued to rapidly weaken. By 06:00 UTC that same day, the MetService reported that Kevin further weakened to a Category 3 severe tropical cyclone. The JTWC subsequently downgraded the system to a Category 1-equivalent tropical cyclone, before reclassifying Kevin as a subtropical cyclone and issuing their final advisory nine hours later, as the low-level circulation center became partially exposed due to convection becoming decoupled southeastwards. MetService further downgraded Kevin to a Category 2 tropical cyclone at 18:00 UTC that same day, before it transitioned into a subtropical cyclone on 6 March. Over the next couple of days, MetService continued to monitor Kevin's subtropical remnants, before they were last noted on 8 March, when they were located about 1,850 km (1,150 mi) to the northwest of Wellington, New Zealand.

== Effects ==
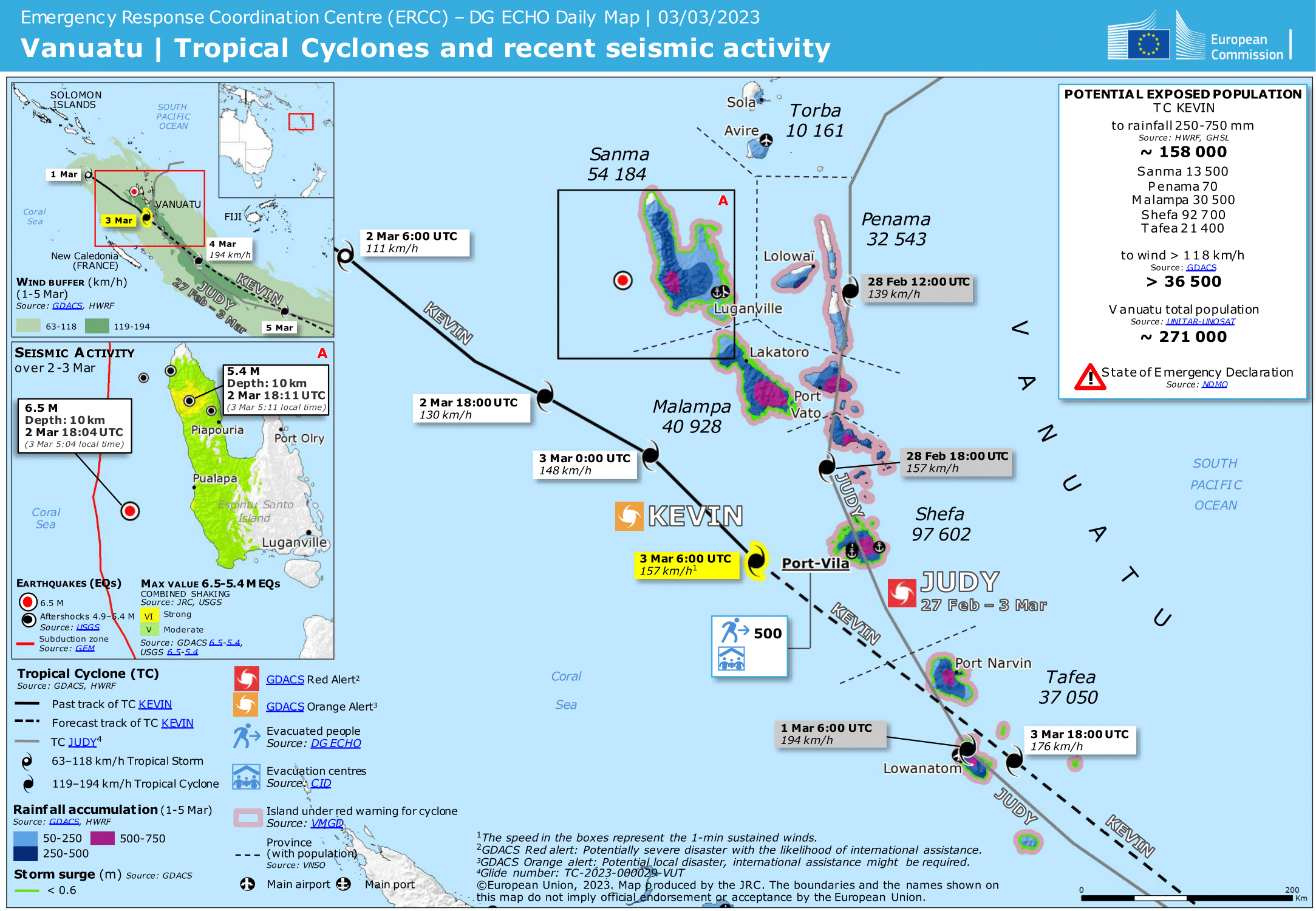
Directorate-General for European Civil Protection and Humanitarian Aid Operations (DG ECHO) daily situation map for Vanuatu on 3 March

=== Solomon Islands ===
On 26 February, the Solomon Islands Meteorological Service (SIMS) started to issue special weather bulletins, which warned that Judy was expected to cause gale-force winds, rough seas, moderate to heavy swells and coastal flooding over southern parts of Temotu Province within 12 - 24 hours. They also noted that strong winds of 35–55 km/h (25–35 mph), moderate to rough seas, heavy rain and thunderstorms were expected to develop over most provinces, as Kevin's precursor tropical low moved towards the islands of Rennell and Bellona Province. After Judy had been named, the SIMS issued a tropical cyclone warning for Temotu Province and a tropical disturbance warning for the rest of the Solomon Islands.

Cyclone Judy impacted the Solomon Islands at the end of February while the system that became Kevin started affecting the nation soon after. Strong winds and damaging waves battered the many islands of the nation for days. Schools and businesses were shuttered across Honiara due to the winds. The vessel M/V Vatud Star ran aground due to a rogue wave. A small boat carrying passengers en route from Honiara to Central Province sank due to rough waves, but all of them managed to swim to safety. Tidal waves produced by the storms destroyed 12 homes in West Honiara. Communications with Lata were interrupted.

=== Vanuatu ===
==== Preparations ====
On 27 February, the Government of Vanuatu issued yellow alerts for Torba, Sanma, Penama, and Malampa Provinces and blue alerts for Shefa and Tafea Provinces ahead of Cyclone Judy's arrival. The four provinces under yellow were soon placed under red alerts as the cyclone progressed along a north to south path through the country. The Vanuatu National Disaster Management Office (NDMO) opened public shelters in Port Vila. The NDMO worked with the Vanuatu Christian Council of Churches to establish shelters at churches in the remainder of Efate and neighboring smaller islands. Local volunteers coordinated with international agencies to warn residents of the storm and provide safety information. Schools and businesses were closed nationwide and Air Vanuatu cancelled all flights. UNICEF reported it had response personnel pre-deployed in Vanuatu. The agency had emergency stockpiles in place across the country, including hygiene kits, health kits, tents, and tarpaulins to support more than 20,000 people. Care International pre-positioned household supplies and building materials in Port Vila and Tanna.

Ahead of Cyclone Kevin's arrival on 3 March, hundreds of residents fled to public shelters.

==== Impact ====
Infrared imagery from 27 February to 5 March of Judy and Kevin passing through Vanuatu

The entirety of Vanuatu was impacted one or both of the cyclones in a four-day period. According to DG ECHO, the entire population experienced winds of at least 60 km/h (37 mph); approximately 251,000 people or about 80 percent of the population were affected by Category 2–3 winds, of whom 150,000 were affected by Category 3–4 winds. Early assessments indicated the worst damage to be in Malapa, Penama, and Shefa Provinces. The storms severed access to running water in these areas and runoff contamination rendered river waters unsafe for consumption. Extensive power outages occurred, with Port Vila remaining offline through 4 March. Bauerfield International Airport sustained damage. Satellite analyses of imagery from the Sentinel-2 by UNOSAT on 4 March revealed extensive damage in Shefa Province with potential storm surge damage along the west coast of Efate Island. Damaged structures were found on Aniwa Island and Erromango in Tafea Province.

Cyclone Judy brought hurricane-force winds to Efate on 28 February, and its eye passed directly over the capital city of Port Vila. Erromango and Tanna lost all communications on 1 March, with the latter remaining isolated nearly a week later. Tropical Cyclone Judy has been bringing heavy rain and strong winds, and requiring the evacuation of residents from the capital, Port Vila. Strong winds from Judy tore the roof off the infant ward at the Vanuatu Central Hospital. However, there are no reports of deaths or serious injuries in Port Vila from Cyclone Judy.

As Cyclone Kevin was impacting the nation on 3 March, a M_{w}6.5 earthquake struck just west of Espiritu Santo at a depth of 10 km (6.2 mi). The earthquake had a maximum Modified Mercalli intensity of VI, indicating strong shaking conditions. The Pacific Tsunami Warning Center indicated no risk of a tsunami. A magnitude 5.5 earthquake aftershock struck the island shortly after.

=== Elsewhere ===
On 28 February, New Zealand's MetService noted a risk of strong winds and large waves for New Caledonia as Cyclone Judy passed to the northeast. A pre-cyclone alert was raised for the Loyalty Islands Province on 2 March as Kevin passed to the northeast.

The Tonga Meteorological Service stated that the cyclones would likely remain far enough away to not have much impact; however, a small chance existed for Kevin to affect the kingdom. During the overnight of 4–5 March, Kevin entered Tonga's territorial waters in the ʻOtu Muʻomuʻa group of islands near Tele-ki-Tokelau and Tele-ki Tonga. As of 6 March no damage was reported.

Although Kevin remained far to the south and west of Fiji on 3–4 March, associated inclement weather stemming from a trough prompted the issuance of heavy rain warnings for Ba, Kadavu, Lau, Lomaiviti, Nadroga-Navosa, and Ra provinces. The Fiji Meteorological Service warned that the southernmost islands could see winds of 45 to 85 km/h (28 to 53 mph) along with damaging ocean swells. Strong winds felled a royal poinciana tree in Naikabula, Ba Province, destroying a home in the process.

== Aftermath ==
Costliest South Pacific Ocean tropical cyclones
Rank	Tropical cyclones	Season	Damage USD	Refs
1	3 Gabrielle	2022–23	$9.2 billion	
2	TD 06F	2022–23	$1.43 billion	
3	5 Winston	2015–16	$1.4 billion	
4	5 Harold	2019–20	$768 million	
5	5 Pam	2014–15	$543 million	
6	5 Judy and Kevin	2022–23	$433 million	
7	4 Val	1991–92	$381 million	
8	5 Lola	2023–24	$352 million	
9	4 Evan	2012–13	$313 million	
10	4 Gita	2017–18	$253 million	

=== Solomon Islands ===
A damage assessment was initiated on 9 March in response to the tropical cyclones by the National Disaster Council and the National Disaster Operations Committee in the Solomon Islands. A patrol boat was sent to transport emergency relief supplies for Anuta and Tikopia. The National Emergency Operation Center sent their gratitude towards the New Zealand Government for their financial support for the deployment. After completion, it was noted that water sources had high turbidity and reservoirs in Tikopia were damaged by landslides caused by the tropical cyclones. People relied on coconut water and water tanks provided by the government. In Anuta, cassava and taro crops were also damaged by landslides. The New Zealand Government, Australian Government, Royal Solomon Islands Police Force, Solomon Islands Red Cross Society, and World Vision Solomon Islands, all provided food and non-food sources to both islands.

=== Vanuatu ===
The Government of Vanuatu declared a state of emergency on 2 March. Shortly after Judy's passage, the Government requested international assistance from Australia and New Zealand. The former pledged to provide water, medical supplies, and damage assessment teams by 6 March. In accordance with the FRANZ agreement the New Zealand High Commission headed coordination with Australia, France, and New Zealand for relief efforts. Within two days, two C-17 Globemaster aircraft reached Port Vila carrying the initial supplies and a 12-person rapid response team. On 5 March, the Royal Australian Navy's HMAS Canberra set sail from Sydney, Australia, toward Vanuatu. The ship carried 600 Australian Defence Force personnel, three CH-47 Chinook helicopters, and landing craft for deployment. The ship could also serve as a mobile hospital. World Vision Australia set up a disaster center to distribute supplies in Port Vila. New Zealand, still reeling from the impacts of Cyclone Gabrielle, deployed a C-130 Hercules aircraft carrying water, temporary shelter kits, and hygiene kits on 4 March. A seven-member team was also sent to assist in response coordination. Furthermore, the Government made a NZ$150,000 cash donation to Vanuatu. Papua New Guinea Prime Minister James Marape offered assistance to Vanuatu on 6 March.

UNICEF sent a 16-member team to Vanuatu to conduct needs assessments and assist in supply distribution by 4 March. They partnered with the Vanuatu Red Cross Society by 4 March to distribute emergency supplies to affected residents. The agency also pledged additional supplies from stockpiles in Fiji. DG ECHO sent their Rapid Response Coordinator to conduct a needs assessment on 6 March.

Digicel suspended call fees to Vanuatu from Fiji, Samoa, Tonga, and Nauru from 6 to 19 March.

== Retirement ==
As a result of the impacts in Vanuatu, the names Judy and Kevin were retired after the season, and they will never be used again for tropical cyclones in this basin. They were replaced by Josese and Kirio respectively for future seasons.

== See also ==
- Weather of 2023
- Tropical cyclones in 2023
- Cyclones Eric and Nigel (1985) – two strong tropical cyclones that impacted Vanuatu and Fiji within a week of each other.
- Cyclone Lola (2023) – another cyclone which made landfall in Vanuatu in October 2023.
