= 161st =

161st is the ordinal form of the number 161. 161st or One hundred and sixty-first may also refer to:

- A fraction, 1/161, equal to one of 161 equal parts

== Geography ==
- 161st meridian east, a line of longitude
- 161st meridian west, a line of longitude

== Military ==
- 161st Brigade (disambiguation)
- 161st Division (disambiguation)
- 161st Regiment (disambiguation)

== See also ==
- June 10, 161st day of the year in a standard year
