= 19th meridian =

19th meridian may refer to:

- 19th meridian east, a line of longitude east of the Greenwich Meridian
- 19th meridian west, a line of longitude west of the Greenwich Meridian
