= 161st meridian =

161st meridian may refer to:

- 161st meridian east, a line of longitude east of the Greenwich Meridian
- 161st meridian west, a line of longitude west of the Greenwich Meridian

161st meridian west	161st meridian east
