= 162nd =

162nd is the ordinal form of the number 162. 162nd or One hundred and sixty-second may also refer to:

- A fraction, 1/162, equal to one of 162 equal parts

== Geography ==
- 162nd meridian east, a line of longitude
- 162nd meridian west, a line of longitude

== Military ==
- 162nd Brigade (disambiguation)
- 162nd Division (disambiguation)
- 162nd Regiment (disambiguation)

== See also ==
- June 11, 162nd day of the year in a standard year
