= 162nd meridian =

162nd meridian may refer to:

- 162nd meridian east, a line of longitude east of the Greenwich Meridian
- 162nd meridian west, a line of longitude west of the Greenwich Meridian

162nd meridian west	162nd meridian east
