= 162nd Regiment =

162nd Regiment may refer to:

- 162nd Fighter Aviation Regiment
- 162nd Infantry Regiment (United States)

== American Civil War regiments ==
- 162nd New York Infantry Regiment
- 162nd Ohio Infantry Regiment

== See also ==
- 162nd Division (disambiguation)
