= 18th meridian =

18th meridian may refer to:

- 18th meridian east, a line of longitude east of the Greenwich Meridian
- 18th meridian west, a line of longitude west of the Greenwich Meridian
