= 161st Brigade =

161st Brigade may refer to:

- 161st Indian Infantry Brigade
- 161st Mechanized Brigade
- 161st (Essex) Brigade
- 161st (Yorkshire) Brigade, Royal Field Artillery

== See also ==
- 161st Division (disambiguation)
- 161st Regiment (disambiguation)
