= List of Category 2 Australian region tropical cyclones =

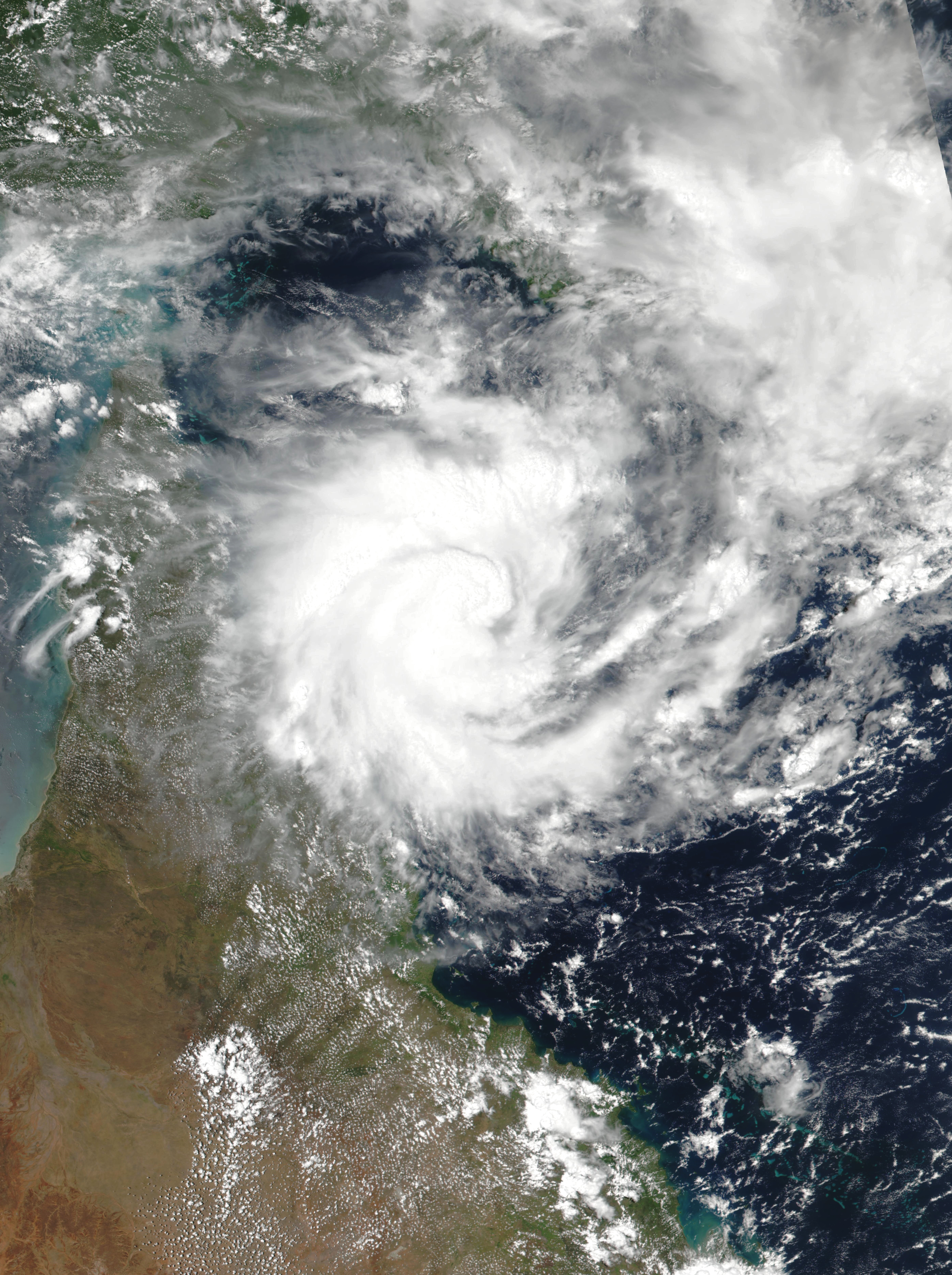
Cyclone Tiffany

Category 2 is the second lowest classification on the Australian tropical cyclone intensity scale used to classify tropical cyclones, that have 10-minute sustained winds of 47–63 knots (87–117 km/h; 54–72 mph). As of 2020 tropical cyclones have peaked as Category 1 tropical cyclones in the South Pacific tropical cyclone basin, which is denoted as the waters surrounding Australia to the south of the equator, between 90°E and 160°E. The earliest tropical cyclone to be classified as a Category 2 tropical cyclone was Carmen. The latest was Harold which was classified as a Category 2 tropical cyclone as it moved through the Solomon Sea.

== Background ==
The Australian region tropical cyclone basin is located to the south of the Equator between 90°E and 160°E. The basin is officially monitored by the Australian Bureau of Meteorology, Papua New Guinea's National Weather Service as well as Indonesia's Badan Meteorologi Klimatologi dan Geofisika. Other meteorological services such as the Fiji Meteorological Service, the New Zealand MetService, Météo-France as well as the United States Joint Typhoon Warning Center also monitor the basin. Within the basin a Category 1 tropical cyclone is a tropical cyclone that has 10-minute mean maximum sustained wind speeds of 33–47 knots (61–87 km/h; 38–54 mph) on the Australian tropical cyclone intensity scale. A named storm could also be classified as a Category 1 tropical cyclone if it is estimated, to have 1-minute mean maximum sustained wind speeds of between 64–82 knots (119–152 km/h; 74–94 mph) on the Saffir–Simpson hurricane wind scale. However, this scale is not officially used in the Australian, however, various agencies including NASA also use it to compare tropical cyclones. A Category 1 tropical cyclone is expected to cause some damage, if it significantly impacts land at or near its peak intensity.

== Systems ==
=== 1960/70s ===
Name	Duration	Peak intensity		Areas affected	Damage (USD)	Deaths	Refs
Name	Duration	Wind speed	Pressure	Areas affected	Damage (USD)	Deaths	Refs
Audrey	7–14 January 1964	Not specified	983 hPa (29.03 inHg)	Northern Territory, Queensland	Extensive	None	
Dawn	15–16 February 1970	100 km/h (65 mph)	980 hPa (28.94 inHg)	New Caledonia			
Gertie	13–15 February 1971	100 km/h (65 mph)	980 hPa (28.94 inHg)	Queensland			
Ida	17–18 February 1971	100 km/h (65 mph)	980 hPa (28.94 inHg)	New Caledonia			
Lena	14–18 March 1971	100 km/h (65 mph)	980 hPa (28.94 inHg)	New Caledonia			
Carlotta
Wendy
Belinda
Ida	30 May – 1 June 1972	100 km/h (65 mph)	980 hPa (28.94 inHg)	Solomon Islands, New Caledonia			
Leila–Gertrude
Annie
Una
Erica
Fiona–Gwenda
Vera
Wanda	20–25 January 1974	95 km/h (60 mph)	998 hPa (29.47 inHg)	Queensland, New South Wales		None	
Yvonne	8–15 February 1974	100 km/h (65 mph)	995 hPa (29.38 inHg)				
Jenny (1974)
Marcia (1974)
Norah (1974)
Penny (1974)
Gloria (1975)
Robyn-Deborah	14 – 29 February 1975	95 km/h (60 mph)	988 hPa (29.18 inHg)	Madagascar			
Shirley (1975)
Wilma (1975)
Vida (1975)
Clara (1975)
Alice (1976)
Dawn (1976)
Harry (1976)
Tom (1977)
Sam–Celimene (1977)
Gwen (1978)
Brenda (1978)
Hal (1978)
Greta (1979)
Ivan (1979)
Jane (1979)
Kevin	2–12 May 1979	95 km/h (60 mph)	985 hPa (29.09 inHg)	None	None	None	
Tony (1979)

=== 1980s ===
Name	Duration	Peak intensity		Areas affected	Damage (USD)	Deaths	Refs
Name	Duration	Wind speed	Pressure	Areas affected	Damage (USD)	Deaths	Refs
Clara	20 - 29 January 1980	110 km/h (70 mph)	980 hPa (28.94 inHg)	None	None	None	
Ruth	11 - 18 February 1980	100 km/h (65 mph)	980 hPa (28.94 inHg)	None	None	None	
Dan	14 - 18 December 1980	95 km/h (60 mph)	985 hPa (29.09 inHg)	None	None	None	
Eddie	8 - 15 February 1981	100 km/h (65 mph)	981 hPa (28.97 inHg)	Northern Australia	Minimal	None	
Cliff	8 - 15 February 1981	95 km/h (60 mph)	980 hPa (28.94 inHg)	Vanuatu, New Caledonia, Queensland		1	
Bruno	10 - 22 January 1982	95 km/h (60 mph)	980 hPa (28.94 inHg)	Western Australia	AU$10 million		
Daphne–Fifi	10 - 21 January 1982	95 km/h (60 mph)	988 hPa (29.18 inHg)	None	None	None	
Errol	11 - 18 January 1982	100 km/h (65 mph)	980 hPa (28.94 inHg)	None	None	None	
Abigail	22 January - 5 February 1982	110 km/h (70 mph)	979 hPa (28.91 inHg)	None	None	None	
Graham	26 January - 2 February 1982	100 km/h (65 mph)	980 hPa (28.94 inHg)	Western Australia	None	None	
Harriet	11 - 18 February 1982	95 km/h (60 mph)	988 hPa (29.18 inHg)	None	None	None	
Tim	2 - 11 January 1984	100 km/h (65 mph)	980 hPa (28.94 inHg)	None	None	None	
Harvey	3 - 10 February 1984	110 km/h (70 mph)	980 hPa (28.94 inHg)	None	None	None	
Ferdinand	2 - 4 March 1984	110 km/h (70 mph)	980 hPa (28.94 inHg)	Northern Territory	Minor	None	
Lance	4 - 7 April 1984	110 km/h (70 mph)	980 hPa (28.94 inHg)	Queensland	N/A	None	
Monica	25 - 29 December 1984	110 km/h (70 mph)	980 hPa (28.94 inHg)	None	None	None	
Nigel	14 – 20 January 1985	110 km/h (70 mph)	996 hPa (29.41 inHg)	Queensland, Vanuatu, Fiji, Tonga			
Pierre	18 – 24 February 1985	95 km/h (60 mph)	986 hPa (29.12 inHg)	Queensland	Minimal	None	
Tanya	27 March – 4 April 1985	100 km/h (65 mph)	982 hPa (29.00 inHg)	Cape York Peninsula	Minimal	None	
Gretel	9 – 14 April 1985	95 km/h (60 mph)	984 hPa (29.06 inHg)	Northern Territory			
Pancho	18 - 22 January 1986	100 km/h (65 mph)	976 hPa (28.82 inHg)	None	None	None	
Selwyn	21 - 26 February 1986	110 km/h (70 mph)	980 hPa (28.94 inHg)	None	None	None	
Tiffany	25 February - 1 March 1986	95 km/h (60 mph)	984 hPa (29.06 inHg)	None	None	None	
Alison–Krisostoma	4 - 14 April 1986	100 km/h (65 mph)	978 hPa (28.88 inHg)	Cocos Islands	None	None	
Irma	19 - 22 January 1987	110 km/h (70 mph)	978 hPa (28.88 inHg)	Northern Territory	Minimal	None	
Damien	30 January - 9 February 1987	95 km/h (60 mph)	980 hPa (28.94 inHg)	Western Australia	None	None	
Kay	5 - 14 April 1987	110 km/h (70 mph)	976 hPa (28.82 inHg)	Northern Territory		None	
Agi	8 - 16 January 1988	110 km/h (70 mph)	980 hPa (28.94 inHg)	Papua New Guinea, New Caledonia		None	
Barisaona	5 - 23 November 1988	100 km/h (65 mph)	Not Specified	None	None	None	
Delilah	28 December 1988 – 4 January 1989	100 km/h (65 mph)	988 hPa (29.18 inHg)	New Caledonia, New Zealand		2	
Meena	28 December 1988 – 4 January 1989	95 km/h (60 mph)	990 hPa (29.23 inHg)	Solomon Islands, Cape York Peninsula		None	
Pedro	4 – 13 November 1989	110 km/h (70 mph)	982 hPa (29.00 inHg)	None	None	None	
Tina	24 – 29 January 1990	95 km/h (60 mph)	976 hPa (28.82 inHg)	Western Australia	Minor	None	
Nancy	28 January – 4 February 1990	110 km/h (70 mph)	976 hPa (28.82 inHg)	Queensland, New South Wales, New Zealand	Unknown	Unknown	
Walter – Gregoara	3 – 13 March 1990	95 km/h (60 mph)	985 hPa (29.09 inHg)	None	None	None	
Hilda	4 – 13 March 1990	110 km/h (70 mph)	970 hPa (28.64 inHg)	New Caledonia	Unknown	Unknown	

=== 1990s ===
Name	Duration	Peak intensity		Areas affected	Damage (USD)	Deaths	Refs
Name	Duration	Wind speed	Pressure	Areas affected	Damage (USD)	Deaths	Refs
Chris	15 – 21 February 1991	110 km/h (70 mph)	976 hPa (28.82 inHg)	Western Australia	None	None	
Daphne	21 – 28 February 1991	110 km/h (70 mph)	976 hPa (28.82 inHg)	Northern Australia	Unknown	Unknown	
Kelvin	24 February – 6 March 1991	95 km/h (60 mph)	980 hPa (28.94 inHg)	Queensland	Unknown	Unknown	
Elma	2 – 5 March 1991	110 km/h (70 mph)	975 hPa (28.79 inHg)	Queensland	None	None	
Fifi	14 – 21 April 1991	110 km/h (70 mph)	975 hPa (28.79 inHg)	Western Australia	Unknown	Unknown	
Lisa	7 – 11 May 1991	110 km/h (70 mph)	975 hPa (28.79 inHg)	Papua New Guinea, Solomon Islands, Vanuatu	None	None	
Mark	6 – 11 January 1992	100 km/h (65 mph)	980 hPa (28.94 inHg)	Queensland, Northern Territory	Unknown	Unknown	
Lena	22 January – 2 February 1993	100 km/h (65 mph)	972 hPa (28.70 inHg)	None	None	None	
Roger	12 – 20 March 1993	110 km/h (70 mph)	980 hPa (28.94 inHg)	Solomon Islands, New Caledonia	Unknown	Unknown	
Monty	6 – 13 April 1993	110 km/h (70 mph)	992 hPa (29.29 inHg)	None	None	None	
Willy	26 April – 2 May 1994	95 km/h (60 mph)	985 hPa (29.09 inHg)	Cocos Islands	None	None	
Ethel	7 – 13 March 1996	100 km/h (65 mph)	982 hPa (29.00 inHg)	Queensland, Northern Territory	Unknown	Unknown	
Jenna	1 – 6 May 1996	100 km/h (65 mph)	984 hPa (29.06 inHg)	None	None	None	
Ophelia		100 km/h (65 mph)	980 hPa (28.94 inHg)	None	None	None	
Fergus	22 – 25 December 1996	110 km/h (70 mph)	975 hPa (28.79 inHg)	Solomon Islands, Vanuatu; New Caledonia, New Zealand	Unknown	Unknown	
Phil	22 December 1996 – 3 January 1997	110 km/h (70 mph)	975 hPa (28.79 inHg)	Northern Australia, Western Australia	Unknown	Unknown	
18S	7 – 12 January 1997	95 km/h (60 mph)	992 hPa (29.29 inHg)	None	None	None	
Harold	16 – 19 February 1997	110 km/h (70 mph)	975 hPa (28.79 inHg)	New Caledonia	Unknown	Unknown	
Nute	19 – 21 November 1997	110 km/h (70 mph)	975 hPa (28.79 inHg)	None	None	None	
Les	21 January – 2 February 1998	110 km/h (70 mph)	976 hPa (28.82 inHg)	Northern Australia	Unknown	Unknown	
Nathan	19 – 30 March 1998	95 km/h (60 mph)	990 hPa (29.23 inHg)	Queensland	None	None	
Cathy	21 January – 2 February 1999	95 km/h (60 mph)	991 hPa (29.26 inHg)	None	None	None	
Pete	21 January – 2 February 1999	95 km/h (60 mph)	985 hPa (29.09 inHg)	New Caledonia	Unknown	Unknown	
Hamish	19 – 21 April 1999	100 km/h (65 mph)	980 hPa (28.94 inHg)	None	None	None	
Ilsa	9 – 17 December 1999	100 km/h (65 mph)	980 hPa (28.94 inHg)	Christmas Island, Western Australia	Unknown	Unknown	

=== 2000s ===
Name	Duration	Peak intensity		Areas affected	Damage (USD)	Deaths	Refs
Name	Duration	Wind speed	Pressure	Areas affected	Damage (USD)	Deaths	Refs
Steve	25 February – 11 March 2000	110 km/h (70 mph)	975 hPa (28.79 inHg)	Northern Australia, Western Australia	Unknown	Unknown	
Olga	14 – 20 March 2000	95 km/h (60 mph)	985 hPa (29.09 inHg)	None	None	None	
Hudah	22 – 25 March 2000	110 km/h (70 mph)	984 hPa (29.06 inHg)	Madagascar, Mozambique	Unknown	Unknown	
Vaughan	3 – 7 April 2000	110 km/h (70 mph)	985 hPa (29.09 inHg)	Queensland	Unknown	Unknown	
Terri	28 January – 1 February 2001	110 km/h (70 mph)	975 hPa (28.79 inHg)	Western Australia	None	None	
Vincent	12 – 15 February 2001	100 km/h (65 mph)	980 hPa (28.94 inHg)	Western Australia	None	None	
Alistair	14 – 24 April 2001	110 km/h (70 mph)	975 hPa (28.79 inHg)	Northern Territory, Western Australia	Minor	None	
Alex – Andre	26 – 31 October 2001	95 km/h (60 mph)	984 hPa (29.06 inHg)	None	None	None	
Bessi – Bako	26 November – 5 December 2001	100 km/h (65 mph)	980 hPa (28.94 inHg)	None	None	None	
Bernie	30 December 2001 – 6 January 2002	95 km/h (60 mph)	980 hPa (28.94 inHg)	Northern Territory	Unknown	Unknown	
Des	3 – 7 March 2002	95 km/h (60 mph)	985 hPa (29.09 inHg)	Eastern Australia, New Caledonia	Unknown	Unknown	
Bonnie	10 - 14 April 2002	95 km/h (60 mph)	985 hPa (29.09 inHg)	Timor, Indonesia	Unknown	Unknown	
Unnamed	4 - 25 January 2003	95 km/h (60 mph)	985 hPa (29.09 inHg)	Northern Territory, Western Australia	Unknown	Unknown	
Craig	7 - 12 March 2003	100 km/h (65 mph)	976 hPa (28.82 inHg)	Queensland, Northern Territory	Unknown	Unknown	
Linda	28 January – 1 February 2004	95 km/h (60 mph)	985 hPa (29.09 inHg)	None	None	None	
Fritz	10 – 15 February 2004	95 km/h (60 mph)	985 hPa (29.09 inHg)	Northern Australia	Unknown	Unknown	
Nicky - Helma	7 – 10 March 2004	95 km/h (60 mph)	985 hPa (29.09 inHg)	None	None	None	
Grace	21 – 23 March 2004	95 km/h (60 mph)	985 hPa (29.09 inHg)	None	None	None	
Sally	6 - 10 January 2005	95 km/h (60 mph)	985 hPa (29.09 inHg)	None	None	None	
Daryl	17 - 23 January 2006	100 km/h (65 mph)	976 hPa (28.82 inHg)	Western Australia	None	None	
Kate	22 - 23 February 2006	95 km/h (60 mph)	985 hPa (29.09 inHg)	Torres Strait	Unknown	Unknown	
Hubert	2 - 8 April 2006	95 km/h (60 mph)	980 hPa (28.94 inHg)	Western Australia	None	None	
Nelson	5 - 7 February 2007	95 km/h (60 mph)	985 hPa (29.09 inHg)	Northern Territory, Queensland	Unknown	Unknown	
Lee - Ariel	11 - 15 November 2007	95 km/h (60 mph)	984 hPa (29.06 inHg)	None	None	None	
Melanie	27 December 2007 - 2 January 2008	110 km/h (70 mph)	962 hPa (28.41 inHg)	Western Australia	None	None	
Helen	31 December 2007 - 7 January 2008	95 km/h (60 mph)	975 hPa (28.79 inHg)	Northern Australia	Unknown	Unknown	
Ophelia	29 February - 7 March 2008	100 km/h (65 mph)	985 hPa (29.09 inHg)	Northern Territory, Western Australia	None	None	
Rosie	20 - 24 April 2008	95 km/h (60 mph)	988 hPa (29.18 inHg)	Christmas Island	Unknown	None	
Durga	20 - 26 April 2008	95 km/h (60 mph)	988 hPa (29.18 inHg)	None	None	None	
Anika	17 - 22 November 2008	95 km/h (60 mph)	990 hPa (29.23 inHg)	None	None	None	
Dominic	24 - 27 January 2009	100 km/h (65 mph)	976 hPa (28.82 inHg)	Western Australia	Unknown	Unknown	
Jasper	23 - 24 March 2009	95 km/h (60 mph)	985 hPa (29.09 inHg)	New Caledonia	Unknown	Unknown	

=== 2010s ===
Name	Duration	Peak intensity		Areas affected	Damage (USD)	Deaths	Refs
Name	Duration	Wind speed	Pressure	Areas affected	Damage (USD)	Deaths	Refs
Olga	21 - 30 January 2010	95 km/h (60 mph)	983 hPa (29.03 inHg)	Solomon Islands, Queensland, Northern Territory	Unknown	Unknown	
Robyn	20 - 25 April 2010	110 km/h (70 mph)	980 hPa (28.94 inHg)	None	None	None	
Sean	20 - 25 April 2010	100 km/h (65 mph)	988 hPa (29.18 inHg)	None	None	None	
Abele	3 - 5 December 2010	95 km/h (60 mph)	985 hPa (29.09 inHg)	None	None	None	
Anthony	23 - 31 January 2011	95 km/h (60 mph)	989 hPa (29.21 inHg)	Queensland	Unknown	Unknown	
Grant	21 – 29 December 2011	110 km/h (70 mph)	976 hPa (28.82 inHg)	Northern Territory, Queensland	Unknown	Unknown	
Iggy	23 January – 3 February 2012	100 km/h (65 mph)	974 hPa (28.76 inHg)	Western Australia	None	None	
Jasmine	31 January – 6 February 2012	110 km/h (70 mph)	976 hPa (28.82 inHg)	Queensland, New Caledonia, Vanuatu, Tonga	Unknown	Unknown	
Koji–Joni	5 – 8 March 2011	95 km/h (60 mph)	985 hPa (29.09 inHg)	None	None	None	
Tim	12 – 20 March 2013	95 km/h (60 mph)	985 hPa (29.09 inHg)	Cape York Peninsula	Unknown	Unknown	
Dylan	24 – 31 January 2014	110 km/h (70 mph)	974 hPa (28.76 inHg)	Queensland	Unknown	Unknown	
09U	31 January – 13 February 2014	100 km/h (65 mph)	980 hPa (28.94 inHg)	Northern Territory, Western Australia	Unknown	Unknown	
Bakung	10 – 13 December 2014	95 km/h (60 mph)	991 hPa (29.26 inHg)	None	None	None	
Stan	27 January – 1 February 2016	100 km/h (65 mph)	980 hPa (28.94 inHg)	Western Australia & Southern Australia	Minor	None	
Uriah	10 – 14 February 2016	95 km/h (60 mph)	987 hPa (29.15 inHg)	Cocos Islands	Minor	None	
Tatiana	9 – 15 February	95 km/h (60 mph)	982 hPa (29.00 inHg)	Queensland	Minor	None	
Alfred	15 – 22 February 2017	95 km/h (60 mph)	987 hPa (29.15 inHg)	Queensland, Northern Territory	Minor	None	
Blanche	1 – 6 March 2017	100 km/h (65 mph)	984 hPa (29.06 inHg)	Western Australia, Northern Territory	Minor	None	
22U	20 – 23 March 2017	95 km/h (60 mph)	985 hPa (29.09 inHg)	Western Australia	Unknown	Unknown	
Dahlia	25 November – 4 December 2017	95 km/h (60 mph)	980 hPa (28.94 inHg)	Indonesia, Christmas Island	Unknown	Unknown	
Hilda	26 – 29 December 2017	100 km/h (65 mph)	980 hPa (28.94 inHg)	Western Australia	Unknown	Unknown	
Iris	24 March – 9 April 2018	100 km/h (65 mph)	987 hPa (29.15 inHg)	Solomon Islands, Queensland	Unknown	Unknown	
Penny	30 December 2018 - 9 January 2019	95 km/h (60 mph)	987 hPa (29.15 inHg)	Queensland	Unknown	Unknown	
Oma	20 - 23 February 2019	100 km/h (65 mph)	980 hPa (28.94 inHg)	Cape York	Unknown	Unknown	
Wallace	3 - 12 April 2019	100 km/h (65 mph)	986 hPa (29.12 inHg)	None	None	None	
Ann	7 - 18 May 2019	95 km/h (60 mph)	993 hPa (29.32 inHg)	Solomon Islands, Northern Australia	Unknown	Unknown	

=== 2020s ===
Name	Duration	Peak intensity		Areas affected	Damage (USD)	Deaths	Refs
Name	Duration	Wind speed	Pressure	Areas affected	Damage (USD)	Deaths	Refs
Imogen	1 - 6 January 2021	95 km/h (60 mph)	985 hPa (29.09 inHg)	Northern Territory, Queensland	Minimal	None	
Lucas	24 January - 1 February 2021	95 km/h (60 mph)	985 hPa (29.09 inHg)	Queensland, New Caledonia	Unknown	Unknown	
Odette	3 - 10 April 2021	95 km/h (60 mph)	986 hPa (29.12 inHg)	Western Australia	Unknown	Unknown	
Ruby	9 - 15 December 2021	110 km/h (70 mph)	980 hPa (28.94 inHg)	New Caledonia	Unknown	Unknown	
Seth	23 December 2021 - 7 January 2022	100 km/h (65 mph)	982 hPa (29.00 inHg)	Northern Territory, Eastern Australia	Unknown	Unknown	
Tiffany	8 - 17 January 2022	95 km/h (60 mph)	989 hPa (29.21 inHg)	Northern Australia	Unknown	Unknown	
Anika	24 February - 4 March 2022	95 km/h (60 mph)	986 hPa (29.12 inHg)	Western Australia	Minimal	None	
Billy	12 - 17 March 2022	95 km/h (60 mph)	988 hPa (29.18 inHg)	None	None	None	
Karim	7 - 11 May 2022	110 km/h (70 mph)	982 hPa (29.00 inHg)	None	None	None	
Paul	9 - 12 April 2024	95 km/h (60 mph)	994 hPa (29.35 inHg)	Papua New Guinea	None	None	
Robyn	23 November - 1 December 2024	100 km/h (65 mph)	985 hPa (29.09 inHg)	None	None	None	
Dianne	27 - 30 March 2025	95 km/h (60 mph)	984 hPa (29.06 inHg)	Western Australia	Unknown	Unknown	

== Other systems ==
RSMC La Reunion classifies Tropical Cyclone Melanie-Bellamine as a severe tropical storm while in the Australian region with 10-minute sustained windspeeds of 95 km/h (60 mph).

== Climatology ==
Category 2 tropical cyclones by month
Month	Number of storms
January	0
February	0
March	0
April	0
May	0
June	0
July	0
August	0
September	0
October	0
November	0
December	0

Category 2 tropical cyclones by decade
Decade	Number of storms
1970s	0
1980s	32
1990s	29
2000s	32
2010s	26
2020s	7

== See also ==
- List of Category 2 Atlantic hurricanes
- List of Category 2 Pacific hurricanes
