= 20th meridian west =

Line of longitude

20th meridian west

The meridian 20° west of Greenwich is a line of longitude that extends from the North Pole across the Arctic Ocean, Greenland, Iceland, the Atlantic Ocean, the Southern Ocean, and Antarctica to the South Pole. The 20th meridian west forms a great ellipse with the 160th meridian east.

In Antarctica, the meridian defines the border between the British Antarctic Territory and Queen Maud Land. Between the 5th parallel north and the 60th parallel south it forms the eastern boundary of the Latin American Nuclear-Weapon-Free Zone.

== From Pole to Pole ==
Starting at the North Pole and heading south to the South Pole, the 20th meridian west passes through:

Co-ordinates	Country, territory or sea	Notes
90°0′N 20°0′W	Arctic Ocean	
81°33′N 20°0′W	Greenland	
78°49′N 20°0′W	Jokel Bay	
77°59′N 20°0′W	Greenland	Gamma Island and Germania Land
76°55′N 20°0′W	Dove Bay	
76°15′N 20°0′W	Greenland	Mainland, Kuhn Island, and the mainland again
74°16′N 20°0′W	Atlantic Ocean	Greenland Sea
66°2′N 20°0′W	Iceland	Northwestern Region; Western Region; Southern Region
63°32′N 20°0′W	Atlantic Ocean	
60°0′S 20°0′W	Southern Ocean	
73°25′S 20°0′W	Antarctica	Border between the Antarctic territorial claims of the United Kingdom and Norway

== See also ==
- 19th meridian west
- 21st meridian west
