= 161st Division =

161st Division or 161st Infantry Division may refer to:

- 161st Division (1st Formation) (People's Republic of China), 1948–1949
- 161st Infantry Division (Wehrmacht), Germany
- 161st Division (Imperial Japanese Army)
- 161st Rifle Division, Soviet Union

== See also ==
- List of military divisions by number
- 161st Brigade (disambiguation)
- 161st Regiment (disambiguation)
- 161st Squadron (disambiguation)
- 161st (disambiguation)
