= 162nd Division =

162nd Division may refer to:

- 162nd Division (People's Republic of China) (1948–1949)
- 162nd Motorized Infantry Division, People's Republic of China (1948–current)
- 162nd Infantry Division (Wehrmacht), Germany
- 162nd Turkestan Division, Wehrmacht, Germany
- 162nd Division (Israel)
- 162nd Rifle Division, Soviet Union

== See also ==
- List of military divisions by number
- 162nd Brigade (disambiguation)
- 162nd Regiment (disambiguation)
- 162nd (disambiguation)
