= Cyclone Eric =

South Pacific cyclone in 1985

Severe Tropical Cyclone Eric
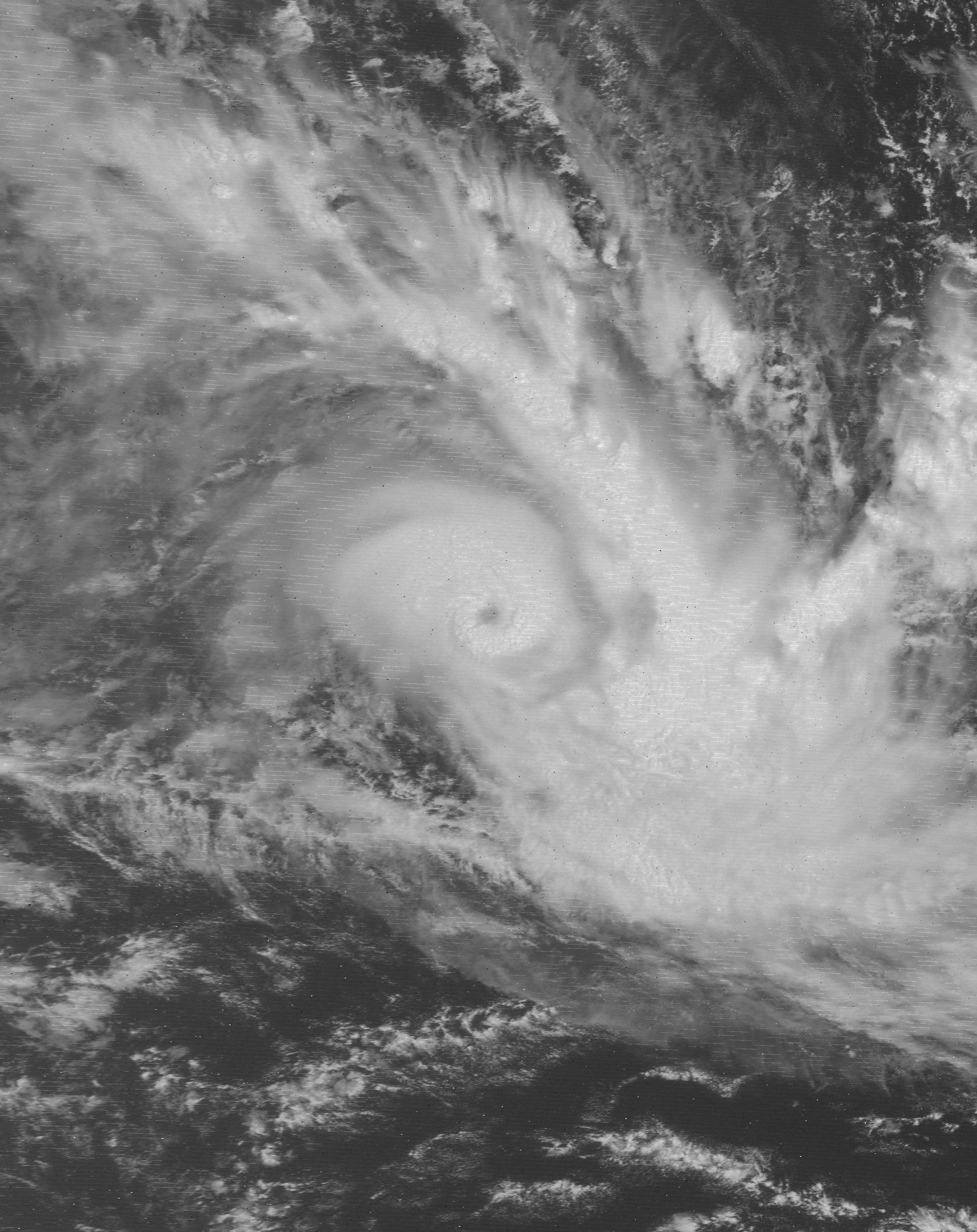
- Tropical Cyclone Eric shortly before peak intensity late on 16 January

Meteorological history
- Formed: 12 January 1985
- Dissipated: 20 January 1985

Category 3 severe tropical cyclone
- 10-minute sustained (MetService)
- Highest winds: 150 km/h (90 mph)
- Lowest pressure: 955 hPa (mbar); 28.20 inHg

Category 3-equivalent tropical cyclone
- 1-minute sustained (SSHWS/JTWC)
- Highest winds: 185 km/h (115 mph)
- Lowest pressure: 941 hPa (mbar); 27.79 inHg

Overall effects
- Fatalities: 25
- Damage: $40 million (1985 USD)
- Areas affected: Vanuatu, Fiji, Tonga
- IBTrACS
- Part of the 1984–85 South Pacific cyclone season

Severe Tropical Cyclone Eric was one of two tropical cyclones to affect the island nations of Vanuatu and Fiji within a week during January 1985. The precursor shallow depression developed within the monsoon trough during 13 January, to the west of Espiritu Santo, Vanuatu. On 16 January, the storm developed-hurricane-force winds and Eric began to undergo rapid deepening. While two different agencies differ on when and how strong Eric was at its peak, it was believed to have peaked on 17 January while passing through the Fiji island group. Shortly after its peak, Eric began to weaken steadily, and by 20 January, Severe Tropical Cyclone Eric had ceased to exist as a tropical cyclone. Combined with another storm – Cyclone Nigel – Eric caused 25 fatalities and $40 million (1985 USD) worth of damage. A total of 299 farms were affected as well as the airport in Nadi. About 30,000 people were left homeless. Severe crop damage was also reported. Viti Levu sustained the worst effects from Cyclone Eric. During the aftermath of the storm, a number of first world countries distributed aid for victims of Eric.

== Meteorological history ==
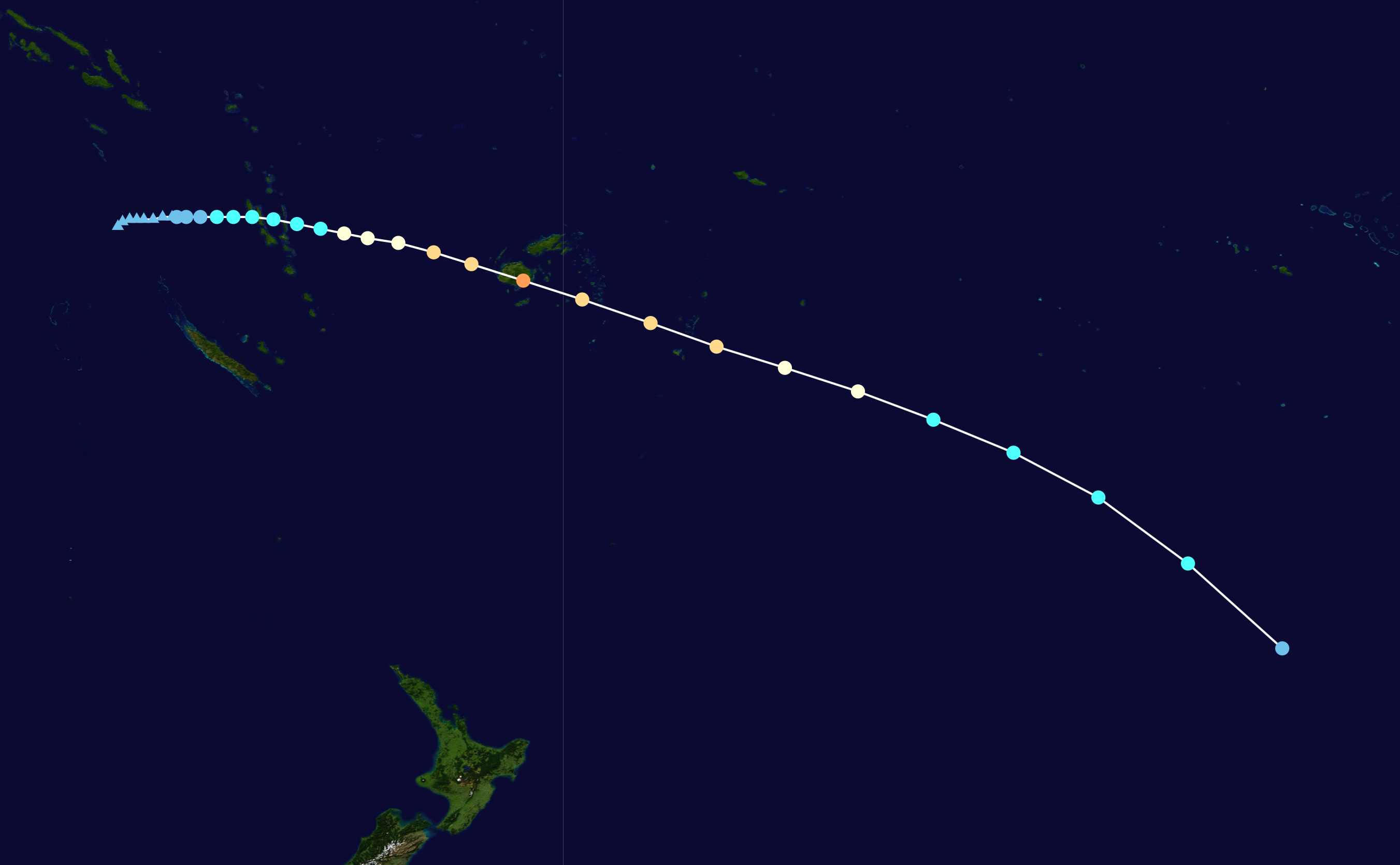
Map plotting the storm's track and intensity, according to the Saffir–Simpson scale Map key Saffir–Simpson scale Tropical depression (≤38 mph, ≤62 km/h) Tropical storm (39–73 mph, 63–118 km/h) Category 1 (74–95 mph, 119–153 km/h) Category 2 (96–110 mph, 154–177 km/h) Category 3 (111–129 mph, 178–208 km/h) Category 4 (130–156 mph, 209–251 km/h) Category 5 (≥157 mph, ≥252 km/h) Unknown Storm type Tropical cyclone Subtropical cyclone Extratropical cyclone, remnant low, tropical disturbance, or monsoon depression

Severe Tropical Cyclone Eric was first noted on January 13, by the Fiji Meteorological Service (FMS) as a shallow depression, located within the monsoon trough about 835 km (520 mi) to the west of Espiritu Santo, Vanuatu. Over the next day, the system gradually developed further as it moved eastwards towards northern Vanuatu, with gale-force winds developing near the systems center, while satellite imagery showed an increase in the "cyclonic curvature" of the "convective cloud". At about 16:00 UTC (04:00 FST), the FMS named the system Eric as it had developed into category one tropical cyclone on the modern day Australian tropical cyclone intensity scale. Over the next day the system continued to develop as it moved eastwards, before the United States Joint Typhoon Warning Center (JTWC) initiated advisories on the system and designated it as Tropical Cyclone 11P. The system subsequently made landfall on Espiritu Santo just before 12:00 UTC (00:00 FST, January 16) as a category two tropical cyclone, before it passed near or over the islands of Ambae, Maewo and Pentecost in northern Vanuatu.

After moving across northern Vanuatu, Eric started to move south-eastwards and began to reorganise itself which made the system hard to track, until an eye appeared on satellite imagery at around 16:00 UTC on January 16, (04:00 FST, January 17), which confirmed that Eric had become a hurricane. Later that day, an Air Pacific flight from Fiji to the Solomon Islands was able to view the hurricane's eye on its radarscope, before it appeared on Nadi airport's radar at around 00:30 UTC (12:30 FST) as it accelerated south-eastwards. At around this time, the FMS estimated that Eric had peaked with 10-minute sustained wind speeds of 150 km/h (90 mph), which made it a category three severe tropical cyclone on the Australian scale. Over the next few hours, the FMS were able to observe Eric on the radar as it continued to accelerate south-eastwards and see the size of its eye contract to about 20 km (10 mi), before the radar's antenna had to be taken down at around 07:00 UTC (19:00 FST) and locked away as the wind speeds at Nadi increased. The hurricane subsequently passed near Malolo in the Mamanuca Islands at about 08:00 UTC (20:00 FST), before it made landfall on Viti Levu about 10 km (5 mi) to the south of Nadi.

As the system made landfall on January 17, the FMS lost all communication with the outside world, which meant that the New Zealand Meteorological Service (NZMS) were forced to take over the FMS's responsibilities for tracking Eric and Severe Tropical Cyclone Nigel. At about 10:45 UTC (22:45 FST), after the winds in Nadi had substantially decreased, the FMS were able to bring the radar back into operation, which showed that Viti Levu's landmass had modified Eric's eye region and caused the system to weaken, but seemed not to have affected its forward speed. At around 12:00 UTC (00:00 FST, January 18), the JTWC estimated that Eric had peaked with 1-minute sustained winds of 185 km/h (115 mph), which made it equivalent to a category three hurricane on the Saffir-Simpson hurricane wind scale. The system subsequently passed over Fiji's capital city of Suva, before it emerged into the Koro Sea as a category 2 tropical cyclone and passed near or over the Lau Islands of Moala, Totoya, Kabara, Fulaga, Ogea Levu and Ogea Driki by 18:00 UTC (06:00 FST, January 18). After moving through the Lau Islands, Eric continued to move south-eastwards and passed just to the south of Nomuka in the Tongan Haʻapai Group of islands at around 03:00 UTC (15:00 FST) on January 18. Over the next couple of days, Eric gradually weakened further over the open seas of the Pacific Ocean, before it was last noted by the NZMS and the JTWC on January 20, over 1,800 km (1,120 mi) to the south of Papeete in French Polynesia.

== Impact ==
=== Fiji ===
Eric was the first of two severe tropical cyclones to make landfall, on the Fijian Island of Viti Levu within 36 hours and was also the first of four tropical cyclones to impact Fiji during 1985. Ahead of Eric making landfall on the Fijian Islands during 17 January, the FMS issued alerts and warnings for various parts of the country including Viti Levu and the Yasawa and Mamanuca island groups.

Offices in Suva were closed around during the afternoon hours of 17 January local time, enabling time to let the workers prepare their houses and businesses. All ships moved out of the port of Suva and took shelter elsewhere. In addition, the Nadi airport was closed and flights were diverted away from Fiji. Residents took shelter wherever they could to survive the storm.

Affecting a densely populated part of the island group, Eric brought $40 million (USD) in damage and took 25 lives. Extensive wind damage was reported; crop damage from Eric was also severe. Over 200 mm (10 in) of rainfall fell in some places, resulting in extensive flooding. The combined systems destroyed 9,500 homes; many schools, shops and, hotels had to be rebuilt because of the storm. Many recreational facilities as well as may commercial builds were also party or completely destroyed by the cyclone. About 30,000 persons were reported as homeless. A total of 299 farms were affecting by the storm, resulting in nearly $2 million in damage; however damage to the pine plantations was minor.

Across Viti Levu, serious damage was reported. The Nadi airport was closed during the storm; four days after the passage of Eric, the airport re-opened for night operations. Damage from the airport alone totaled $1 million. The west part of Viti Levu as well as some other surrounding islands sustained the worst damage, though interior areas of Viti Levu suffered from severe crop damage.

=== Other islands ===
Cyclone Eric was the first of three tropical cyclones to affect Vanuatu within a week, however, there was no significant damage reported after Cyclone Eric passed through the northern islands of Vanuatu. Heavy rain associated with the system helped ease a drought in the island nation, while all 3 cyclones disrupted inter-island transport. Within Tonga there was no casualties or major damage reported, however, around 80% of the banana crop was damaged while several homes and a wharf were destroyed.

== Aftermath ==
During the initial aftermath of Cyclone Eric the Fijian Government's Emergency Services Committee met regularly to coordinate relief efforts, with aerial and ground surveys of the cyclone damaged areas starting during 18 January. Ships were also dispatched to the outer islands, in order to deliver relief supplies and assess the damage. However, the completion of these surveys had to be postponed, as Severe Tropical Cyclone Nigel made landfall on Fiji. Throughout the region relief centers were set up to accommodate the homeless, before they were closed towards the end of January with victims given various shelter materials and food supplies.

During 22 January, the Fijian Government outlined their long-term rehabilitation needs and requested international assistance from the United Nations Disaster Relief Organization and other countries. These needs included a 6-month food-rationing project for 10,000 households, a rehabilitation program for 10,000 shelters and improved internal communication including between the FMS in Nadi and the capital city Suva. Administration of the relief and rehabilitation program was transferred from the Emergency Services Committee to the Prime Minister's Relief and Rehabilitation Committee on 31 January.

== See also ==
- Cyclone Evan
- Cyclone Kina
