= Cyclone Nigel =

Category 3 tropical cyclone in 1985

Severe Tropical Cyclone Nigel
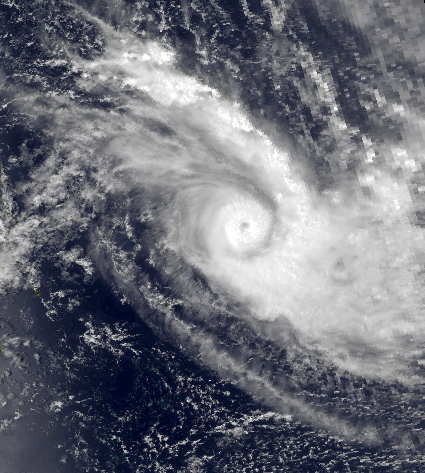
- Cyclone Nigel on 19 January 1985

Meteorological history
- Formed: 14 January 1985
- Dissipated: 20 January 1985

Category 3 severe tropical cyclone
- 10-minute sustained (MetService)
- Highest winds: 150 km/h (90 mph)
- Lowest pressure: 955 hPa (mbar); 28.20 inHg

Category 3-equivalent tropical cyclone
- 1-minute sustained (SSHWS/JTWC)
- Highest winds: 195 km/h (120 mph)

Overall effects
- Fatalities: 25
- Damage: $40 million (1985 USD)
- Areas affected: Vanuatu, Fiji
- IBTrACS
- Part of the 1984–85 Australian region and the South Pacific cyclone seasons

Severe Tropical Cyclone Nigel was the second of two tropical cyclones to affect Northern Vanuatu and the Fijian islands during January 1985. The system was first noted as an ill-defined low-pressure area ("low") located within the Intertropical Convergence Zone near the Cape York Peninsula. Over the next few days the low moved eastwards and increased in strength; it was named Nigel on 16 January as it developed into a tropical cyclone.

== Meteorological history ==
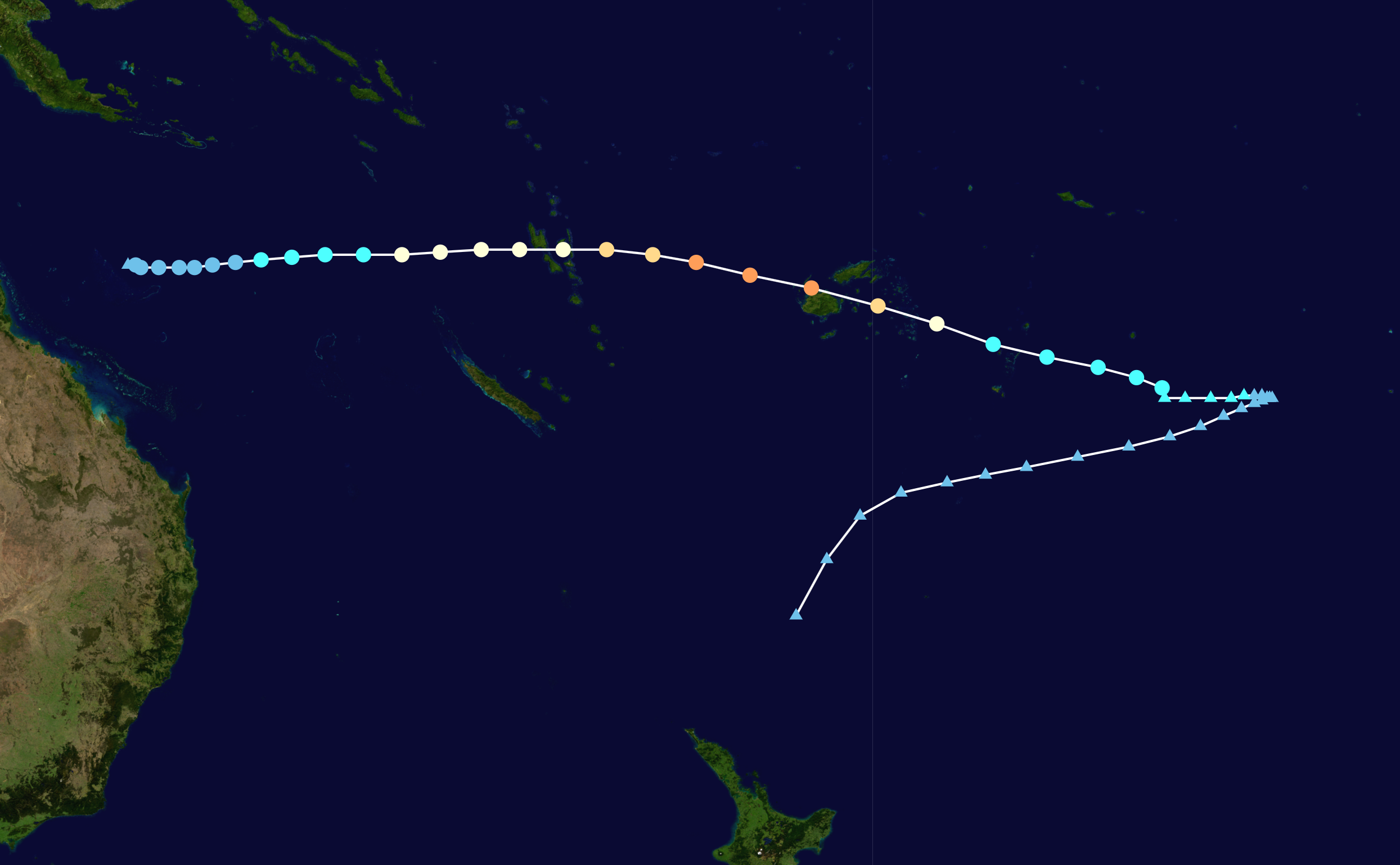
Map plotting the storm's track and intensity, according to the Saffir–Simpson scale Map key Saffir–Simpson scale Tropical depression (≤38 mph, ≤62 km/h) Tropical storm (39–73 mph, 63–118 km/h) Category 1 (74–95 mph, 119–153 km/h) Category 2 (96–110 mph, 154–177 km/h) Category 3 (111–129 mph, 178–208 km/h) Category 4 (130–156 mph, 209–251 km/h) Category 5 (≥157 mph, ≥252 km/h) Unknown Storm type Tropical cyclone Subtropical cyclone Extratropical cyclone, remnant low, tropical disturbance, or monsoon depression

Severe Tropical Cyclone Nigel was first noted by the Australian Bureau of Meteorology (BoM) as an ill-defined low, located within the Intertropical Convergence Zone near the Cape York Peninsula during January 1985. Over the next several days, the system gradually moved eastwards into the Coral Sea, before the BoM reported that a tropical low had developed about 480 km (300 mi) to the northeast of Townsville, Queensland during 14 January. Over the next couple of days, the low continued to develop further as it moved eastwards, before on 16 January, the United States Joint Typhoon Warning Center (JTWC) initiated advisories and designated the system as Tropical Cyclone 13P. Later that day, the BoM named the system Nigel after an eye had become distinct on satellite imagery and it had developed into a modern day category 2 tropical cyclone on the Australian tropical cyclone intensity scale. At this stage, the newly named system was located about 1010 km (630 mi) to the northwest of Port Vila, Vanuatu and was moving out of the Australian region and into South Pacific basin, where it came under the purview of the Fiji Meteorological Service (FMS).

As the newly named system moved into the basin on 17 January, the FMS reported that Nigel had become a hurricane or a category 3 severe tropical cyclone, with 10-minute sustained windspeeds estimated at 120 km/h (75 mph). The system subsequently accelerated eastwards during that day, before it passed very near or over various islands in northern Vanuatu including Espiritu Santo, Malo, Ambae, and Pentecost. After moving through northern Vanuatu, Nigel started to move south-eastwards towards Fiji, before at around 00:00 UTC (12:00 Fiji Standard Time) on 19 January, the JTWC reported that the system had peaked with 1-minute sustained wind speeds of 195 km/h (120 mph), which made it equivalent to a category 3 hurricane on the Saffir-Simpson hurricane wind scale. At around the same time, the FMS estimated that Nigel had peaked with 10-minute sustained wind speeds of 140–150 km/h (85–90 mph), which made it a category 3 severe tropical cyclone on the Australian scale. At this stage, the system was located about 200 km (125 mi) to the northeast of Nadi and its eye had started to appear on the radar at Nadi airport. Radar imagery showed that the hurricane had started to weaken as it had a large clear area next to its eyewall, which the FMS speculated was due to strong vertical windshear and drier air driven up from higher latitudes by Cyclone Eric.

On 19 January, the system moved south-eastwards through Fiji's Yasawa Islands and Mamanuca Islands before it made landfall on Viti Levu to the west of Ba at about 05.15 UTC (17.15 FST). Over the next few hours frictional forces and a decrease in its moisture intake caused the system to weaken further, while it also slowed down and started to move eastwards. By about 09.00 UTC (21.00 FST), Nigel had emerged back into the Pacific Ocean and near Wakaya in the Lomaiviti Islands, while the FMS estimated that the system had weakened into a category 1 tropical cyclone. During that day, Nigel continued to move eastwards and passed near the Lau Islands of Cicia and Tuvuca, before it passed through Tonga's Haʻapai group of islands and about 160 km (100 mi) to the south of Alofi, Niue during 20 January. Over the next few days, the system continued to be monitored by both the FMS and New Zealand's Meteorological Service, before it was last noted on 28 January, while located about 800 km (495 mi) to the north of Auckland, New Zealand.

== Preparations and impact ==
=== Vanuatu ===
Cyclone Nigel was the second of three tropical cyclones to affect Vanuatu within a week, and the second of five tropical cyclones to impact Vanuatu in 1985. Nigel affected the islands of Espiritu Santo, Ambae, Maewo and Pentecost between 17 and 18 January, and was thought to have caused more damage than Cyclone Eric. As the system passed near the weather station on Espiritu Santo, an anemometer was destroyed as it recorded a wind gust of 157 km/h (98 mph), while a minimum pressure of 987.9 hPa (29.17 inHg) was also recorded.

After assessing the damage and finding thousands of people homeless, the Government of Vanuatu established a disaster relief and reconstruction fund.

The Government of Vanuatu asked the Australian Government for emergency food aid and other emergency humanitarian relief assistance including shelters and sanitation equipment. Australia flew in four survey teams by helicopter and sent six C-130 plane loads of humanitarian assistance which included plastic sheeting, ropes, medical supplies, clothing and rice. UNDRO and the governments of the UK and the US donated money to the Vanuatuan Government, while France donated a cargo of food that was flown in from Nouméa, New Caledonia.

=== Fiji ===
Nigel was the second of two severe tropical cyclones to make landfall on the Fijian Island of Viti Levu within 36 hours, and the second of four tropical cyclones to impact Fiji in 1985. Ahead of the system making landfall, relief efforts for Cyclone Eric, which had hit the same region just two days earlier, had to be suspended. As the system affected Fiji, around 1000 people took shelter in the Nadi International Airport passenger terminal.

Once Nigel left Fiji, on 19 January, the relief effort from Cyclone Eric was resumed with ships sent to the outer islands to assess the damage. 272 tourists were flown back to Melbourne Airport during 21 January, after they had been through both systems. The following day the Fijian Government outlined their long-term rehabilitation needs and requested international assistance from the United Nations Disaster Relief Organization and various countries. These needs included a six-month food-rationing project for 10,000 households, a rehabilitation program for 10,000 shelters and improved internal communication including between the FMS in Nadi and the capital city Suva. Australia donated $100,000 to the Fijian Prime Ministers Relief Fund in order to provide food to those who needed it.

== See also ==
- Cyclone Eric
- Cyclone Evan
- Cyclone Kina
