= 162nd Division (People's Republic of China) =

Infantry division of the People's Liberation Army from 1948 to 1949

162nd Division (1948–49)
- Active: 1948.11 - 1949.10
- Country: People's Republic of China
- Branch: People's Liberation Army
- Type: Division
- Role: Infantry
- Part of: 49th Corps
- Engagements: Chinese Civil War

The 162nd Division (Chinese: 第50师) was created in November 1948 under the Regulation of the Redesignations of All Organizations and Units of the Army, issued by Central Military Commission on November 1, 1948, basing on the 13th Independent Division of Northeastern People's Liberation Army, formed in September.

The division was part of 49th Corps. Under the flag of 162nd division it took part in the Chinese Civil War. In October 1949 the division was disbanded.

As of disbandment the division was composed of:

- 484th Regiment;
- 485th Regiment;
- 486th Regiment.
