= 18th meridian west =

Line of longitude

The meridian 18° west of Greenwich is a line of longitude that extends from the North Pole across the Arctic Ocean, Greenland, Iceland, the Atlantic Ocean, the Canary Islands, the Southern Ocean, and Antarctica to the South Pole.

The 18th meridian west forms a great circle with the 162nd meridian east.

== From Pole to Pole ==
Starting at the North Pole and heading south to the South Pole, the 18th meridian west passes through:

Co-ordinates	Country, territory or sea	Notes
90°0′N 18°0′W	Arctic Ocean	
82°8′N 18°0′W	Greenland	Prinsesse Margrethe Island, Prinsesse Dagmar Island, and mainland
79°41′N 18°0′W	Atlantic Ocean	Greenland Sea
78°47′N 18°0′W	Greenland	Bourbon Island
78°44′N 18°0′W	Atlantic Ocean	Greenland Sea
77°46′N 18°0′W	Greenland	Ile de France
77°37′N 18°0′W	Atlantic Ocean	Greenland Sea
75°24′N 18°0′W	Greenland	Shannon Island
75°1′N 18°0′W	Atlantic Ocean	Greenland Sea
66°33′N 18°0′W	Iceland	Island of Grímsey
66°31′N 18°0′W	Atlantic Ocean	
66°9′N 18°0′W	Iceland	
63°31′N 18°0′W	Atlantic Ocean	
28°46′N 18°0′W	Spain	Island of La Palma
28°45′N 18°0′W	Atlantic Ocean	
27°48′N 18°0′W	Spain	Island of El Hierro
27°38′N 18°0′W	Atlantic Ocean	
60°0′S 18°0′W	Southern Ocean	
72°32′S 18°0′W	Antarctica	Queen Maud Land, claimed by Norway

== See also ==
- 17th meridian west
- 19th meridian west
