= 19th meridian east =

Line of longitude

19th meridian east

The meridian 19° east of Greenwich is a line of longitude that extends from the North Pole across the Arctic Ocean, Europe, Africa, the Atlantic Ocean, the Southern Ocean, and Antarctica to the South Pole.

The 19th meridian east forms a great ellipse with the 161st meridian west.

== From Pole to Pole ==
Starting at the North Pole and heading south to the South Pole, the 19th meridian east passes through:

Co-ordinates	Country, territory or sea	Notes
90°0′N 19°0′E	Arctic Ocean	
80°9′N 19°0′E	Norway	Islands of Nordaustlandet and Spitsbergen, Svalbard
78°5′N 19°0′E	Barents Sea	
74°31′N 19°0′E	Norway	Bear Island
74°23′N 19°0′E	Atlantic Ocean	Norwegian Sea
70°11′N 19°0′E	Norway	Islands of Nordkvaløya, Ringvassøya, Kvaløya, Tromsøya and the mainland
68°31′N 19°0′E	Sweden	
63°12′N 19°0′E	Baltic Sea	Gulf of Bothnia
59°54′N 19°0′E	Sweden	
59°42′N 19°0′E	Baltic Sea	Passing just west of the island of Gotska Sandön, Sweden
57°55′N 19°0′E	Sweden	Island of Gotland
57°46′N 19°0′E	Baltic Sea	
54°21′N 19°0′E	Poland	Passing just west of Katowice
49°24′N 19°0′E	Slovakia	
48°3′N 19°0′E	Hungary	Passing just west of Budapest
45°57′N 19°0′E	Serbia	
45°33′N 19°0′E	Croatia	For about 16 km
45°24′N 19°0′E	Serbia	For about 4 km
45°22′N 19°0′E	Croatia	
44°51′N 19°0′E	Bosnia and Herzegovina	
43°32′N 19°0′E	Montenegro	For about 13 km
43°24′N 19°0′E	Bosnia and Herzegovina	For about 14 km
43°16′N 19°0′E	Montenegro	
42°9′N 19°0′E	Mediterranean Sea	
30°16′N 19°0′E	Libya	
22°2′N 19°0′E	Chad	
8°59′N 19°0′E	Central African Republic	
8°46′N 19°0′E	Chad	
8°31′N 19°0′E	Central African Republic	
4°44′N 19°0′E	Democratic Republic of the Congo	
8°0′S 19°0′E	Angola	
17°50′S 19°0′E	Namibia	
28°54′S 19°0′E	South Africa	Northern Cape; Western Cape
34°20′S 19°0′E	Atlantic Ocean	
60°0′S 19°0′E	Southern Ocean	
69°56′S 19°0′E	Antarctica	Queen Maud Land, claimed by Norway

== See also ==
- 18th meridian east
- 20th meridian east
