= 161st Division (1st Formation) (People's Republic of China) =

161st Division (1948–49)
- Active: 1948.11 - 1949.8
- Country: People's Republic of China
- Branch: People's Liberation Army
- Type: Division
- Role: Infantry
- Part of: 48th Corps
- Engagements: Chinese Civil War

The 161st Division(Chinese: 第161师) was created in November 1948 under the Regulation of the Redesignations of All Organizations and Units of the Army, issued by Central Military Commission on November 1, 1948, basing on the 6th Independent Division of Jichareliao Military Region, formed in February.

The division was a part of 48th Corps. Under the flag of 161st division it took part in the Chinese Civil War. In August 1949 the division was disbanded.

As of disbandment the division was composed of:

- 481st Regiment;
- 482nd Regiment;
- 483rd Regiment.
