= 18th meridian east =

Line of longitude

18th meridian east

The meridian 18° east of Greenwich is a line of longitude that extends from the North Pole across the Arctic Ocean, Europe, Africa, the Atlantic Ocean, the Southern Ocean, and Antarctica to the South Pole.

The 18th meridian east forms a great circle with the 162nd meridian west.

== From Pole to Pole ==
Starting at the North Pole and heading south to the South Pole, the 18th meridian east passes through:

| Co-ordinates | Country, territory or sea | Notes |
|---|---|---|
| 90°0′N 18°0′E | Arctic Ocean | |
| 80°11′N 18°0′E | Norway | Islands of Nordaustlandet and Spitsbergen, Svalbard |
| 77°30′N 18°0′E | Atlantic Ocean | Norwegian Sea |
| 69°31′N 18°0′E | Norway | Island of Senja and the mainland |
| 68°4′N 18°0′E | Sweden | |
| 62°34′N 18°0′E | Baltic Sea | Gulf of Bothnia |
| 60°36′N 18°0′E | Sweden | Passing through Stockholm, right through Strawberry Arena |
| 58°56′N 18°0′E | Baltic Sea | Passing between the islands of Stora Karlsö and Gotland, Sweden |
| 54°50′N 18°0′E | Poland | Passing through the centre of Bydgoszcz |
| 50°1′N 18°0′E | Czech Republic | |
| 49°2′N 18°0′E | Slovakia | |
| 47°44′N 18°0′E | Hungary | |
| 45°48′N 18°0′E | Croatia | Passing just west of Slavonski Brod |
| 45°8′N 18°0′E | Bosnia and Herzegovina | Passing near Mostar |
| 42°45′N 18°0′E | Croatia | Mainland (for about 6 km) and the island of Koločep. Passing just west of Dubrovnik |
| 42°40′N 18°0′E | Mediterranean Sea | Adriatic Sea |
| 40°38′N 18°0′E | Italy | Municipality of Gallipoli, Apulia. |
| 39°59′N 18°0′E | Mediterranean Sea | |
| 30°50′N 18°0′E | Libya | |
| 22°31′N 18°0′E | Chad | |
| 7°59′N 18°0′E | Central African Republic | |
| 3°34′N 18°0′E | Republic of the Congo | |
| 1°23′N 18°0′E | Democratic Republic of the Congo | |
| 8°6′S 18°0′E | Angola | |
| 17°23′S 18°0′E | Namibia | |
| 28°49′S 18°0′E | South Africa | Northern Cape; Western Cape |
| 31°28′S 18°0′E | Atlantic Ocean | |
| 32°44′S 18°0′E | South Africa | Western Cape |
| 33°8′S 18°0′E | Atlantic Ocean | Passing just west of Dassen Island, South Africa (at 33°25′24″S 18°5′14″E) |
| 60°0′S 18°0′E | Southern Ocean | |
| 69°43′S 18°0′E | Antarctica | Queen Maud Land, claimed by Norway |

== See also ==
- 17th meridian east
- 19th meridian east
