= 162nd Fighter Aviation Regiment =

162nd Fighter Aviation Regiment (1941–1942, 1943–1949); 162nd Mixed Aviation Regiment (1942–1943); 162nd Fighter Aviation Regiment PVO (1949–1959)
- Active: 1941–1959
- Country: Soviet Union
- Branch: Soviet Air Forces; Soviet Air Defense Forces
- Type: Aviation regiment
- Engagements: World War II
- Decorations: Order of the Red Banner; Order of Suvorov 3rd class
- Honorifics: Grodno

The 162nd Fighter Aviation Regiment (Russian: 162-й истребительный авиационный полк) was a fighter regiment (IAP) of the Soviet Air Force during World War II that became part of the Soviet Air Defense Force (PVO) during the Cold War as the 162nd Fighter Aviation Regiment PVO. It was disbanded in 1959 during the reorganization of the PVO.

== World War II ==
The 162nd IAP was formed on 1 January 1941 at Mogilev in the Western Special Military District. Equipped with the Polikarpov I-16 monoplane and Polikarpov I-153 biplane fighters, the regiment was formed from young graduates of flight-technical schools. It was assigned to the 43rd Fighter Aviation Division (IAD) of the Air Forces (VVS) of the Western Special Military District (which became the VVS of the Western Front after 22 June). When Operation Barbarossa, the German invasion of the Soviet Union, began on 22 June, the regiment began flying sorties with its I-16s.

It was withdrawn to Kursk on 29 June and transferred to the 60th Mixed Aviation Division (SmAD) of the VVS of the Orel Military District. There, between 3 July and 18 August, the regiment converted to newer Mikoyan-Gurevich MiG-3 fighters and was reorganized to a structure that included three aviation squadrons and a total of 32 combat aircraft from its prewar structure of four squadrons with 63 combat aircraft. The 162nd IAP flew sorties on the MiG-3 with the 60th SmAD, now part of the Bryansk Front, between 20 August and 16 October. The first regimental commander, Major Mikhail Reznik, was severely wounded in October and evacuated to a hospital, but did not return to combat and spent the rest of the war on staff duty. He was replaced by Captain Boris Kukin in November, who was later promoted to major and commanded the regiment until February 1943.

It was soon withdrawn to Ob in the Siberian Military District, where it retrained on the Lavochkin-Gorbunov-Gudkov LaGG-3 with the 19th Reserve Fighter Aviation Regiment between 26 November and 15 January 1942, and reorganized to include two squadrons with a total of twenty combat aircraft. The regiment was then moved west to Seyma in the Moscow Military District, where it completed its LaGG-3 training with the 2nd Reserve IAP between 25 January and 28 February.

The 162nd reentered combat on 9 March, directly subordinated to the command of the VVS Western Front. The regiment became part of the 5th Shock Aviation Group of the Reserve of the Supreme High Command on 15 April, which was directly subordinated to the VVS Western Front. A month later, it was reorganized as a mixed aviation regiment (SAP) while retaining its number; the regiment now included one LaGG-3 squadron and two squadrons of Polikarpov U-2 reconnaissance aircraft. The 162nd SAP flew sorties with the VVS of the 5th Army of the Western Front until February 1943.

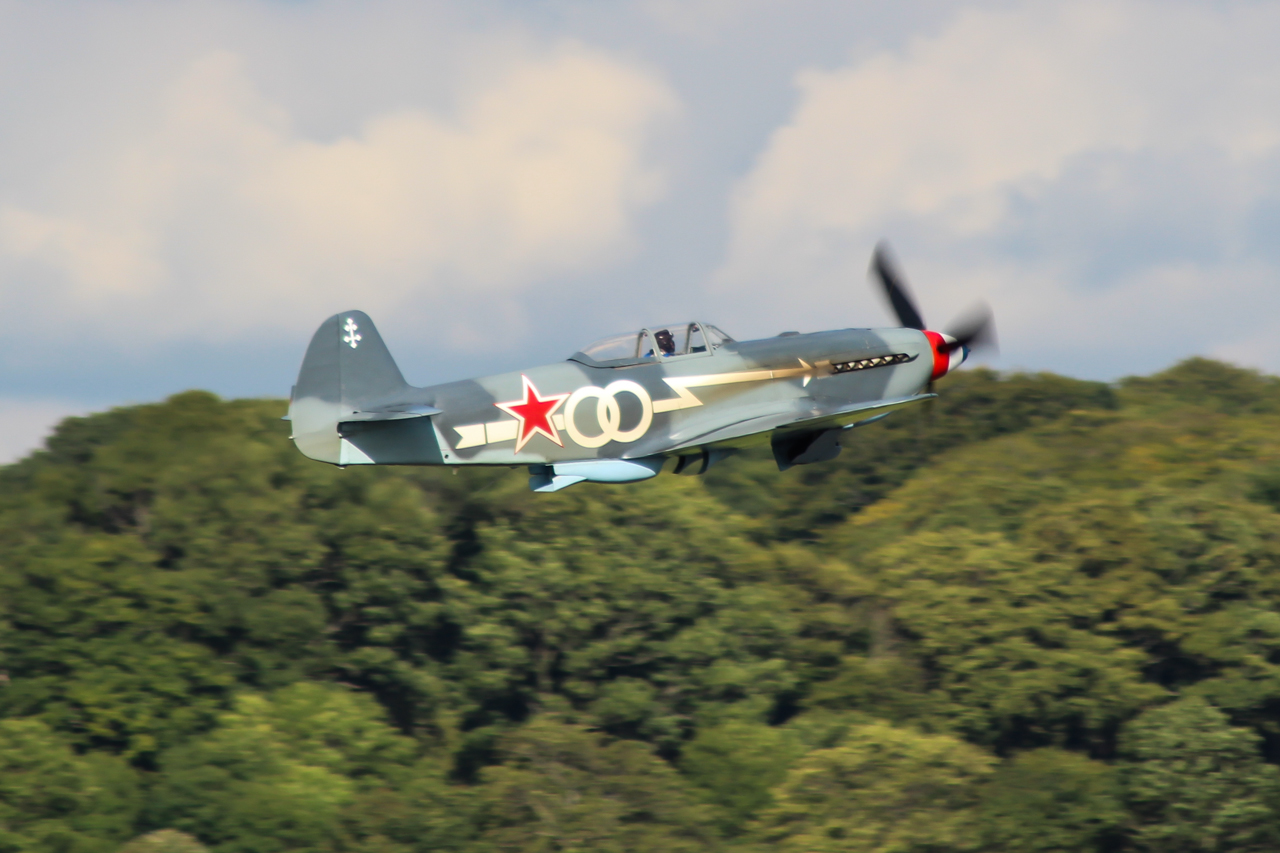
A Yak-9 of the type operated by the regiment

The regiment became an IAP again on 18 February, this time with three squadrons allotted a total of 32 combat aircraft (ten per squadron and two in headquarters flight). Simultaneously, it was re-equipped with newer Yakovlev Yak-1 and Yak-7B fighters in the rear of the front, and Major Aleksandr Lopukhovsky took command. Four days later, the 162nd returned to combat as part of the 309th IAD of the 1st Air Army of the Western Front (which became the 3rd Belorussian Front on 24 April 1944); it would serve with the 309th for the rest of the war. Major Pyotr Kolomin replaced Lopukhovsky on 27 July; he would command the regiment for the rest of the war and be promoted to lieutenant colonel. While in combat between 1943 and 1944, the regiment received upgraded Yakovlev Yak-9 fighters as replacement aircraft. During its time with the 1st Air Army, the regiment flew 2,548 sorties with the loss of 44 aircraft and 29 pilots.

Together with the 309th IAD, the regiment transferred to the 4th Air Army of the 2nd Belorussian Front on 28 April 1944. For its contributions in the capture of Grodno during Operation Bagration in midyear, the 162nd received the name of the city as an honorific on 25 July. It was further decorated with the Order of the Red Banner on 2 August in recognition of its "exemplary performance of sorties" and "courage and valor". The regiment was reorganized to include three squadrons with a total of 40 aircraft (12 to each squadron and four in headquarters flight) in November. The regiment ended the war with the 2nd Belorussian Front on 9 May. It received its final decoration, the Order of Suvorov, 3rd class, on 4 June, for its actions in the capture of Prenzlau and Angermünde during the Berlin Offensive. During its service with the 4th Air Army, the regiment flew 6,001 sorties with the loss of 29 aircraft and seventeen pilots.

Out of 58 combat and 30 operational aircraft losses between 1943 and 1945, the regiment lost one I-16 and two LaGG-3s in 1943, nine Yak-1s, 33 Yak-7Bs, and 43 Yak-9s. Having flown 1,400 sorties in 1941 and 1,873 in 1942, the regiment made a total of 11,822 sorties during the war. It claimed 31 enemy aircraft downed in 1941, nineteen in 1942, 144 in 1943, 43 in 1944, and fourteen in 1945. Pilot losses between 1943 and 1945 totalled 45, with 22 in 1943, nineteen in 1944, and four in 1945.

== Postwar ==
After the end of the war, the regiment remained with the 4th Air Army in the Northern Group of Forces and was re-equipped with the Yakovlev Yak-3 fighter in October. It transferred with the 309th to the 7th Air Army of the Baku Military District between November and December. After arriving in the Baku Military District, it again transferred with the 309th to the 11th Air Army of the Transcaucasian Military District in April 1946. This proved to be brief, and in May the regiment was sent to Kubinka in the Moscow Military District to retrain on the American Bell P-63 Kingcobra Lend-Lease fighter, returning to the 309th after the completion of its conversion and being transferred with the division to the 5th Fighter Aviation Corps (IAK) of the 7th Air Army of the Transcaucasian Military District in December 1947.

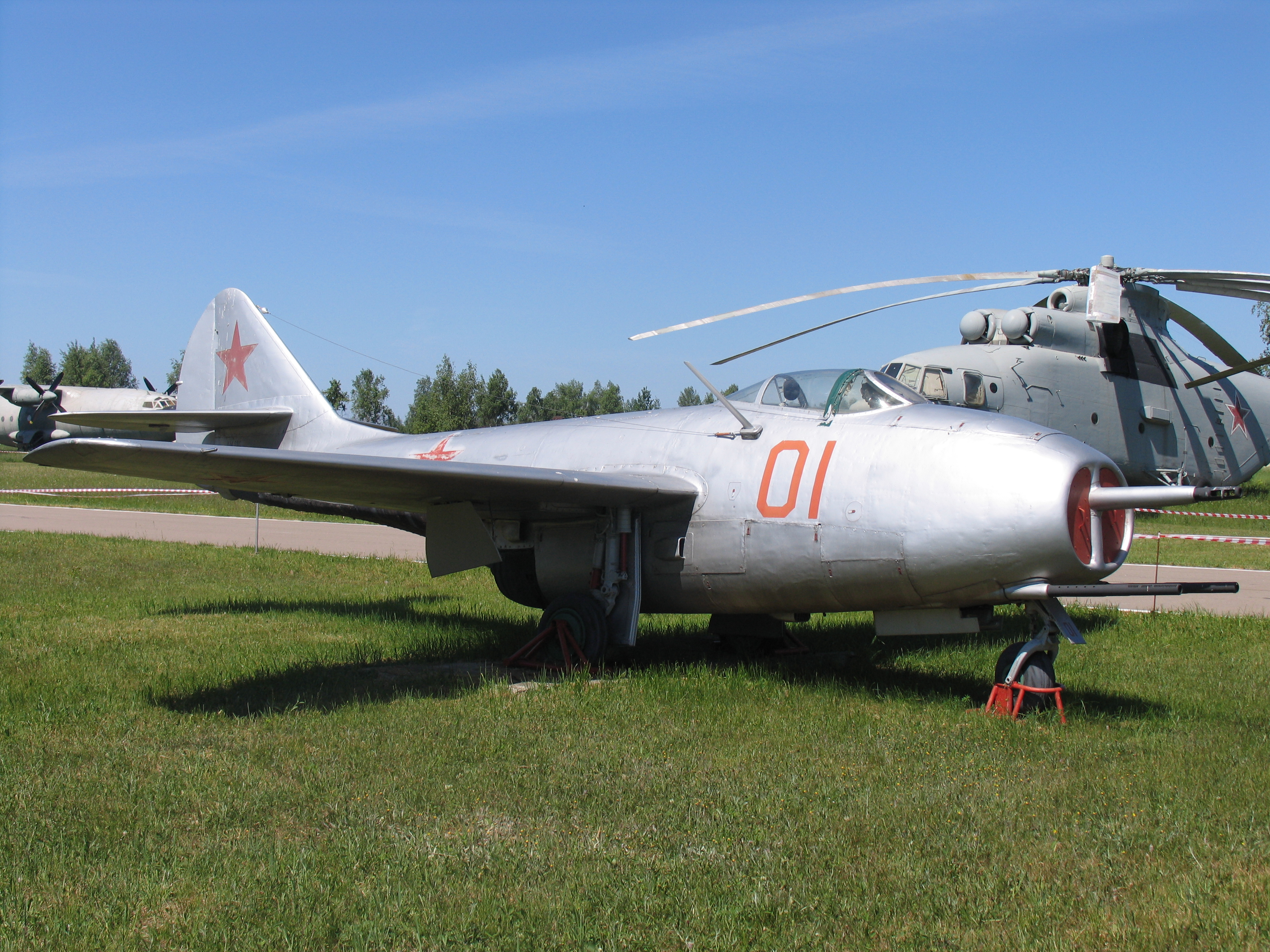
A MiG-9 of the type operated by the regiment

Receiving its first Mikoyan-Gurevich MiG-9 jet fighters in April 1949, the regiment was sent to Gunshulin in the People's Republic of China with the 309th IAD between October 1950 and March 1952 to train People's Liberation Army Air Force pilots on jet fighters and provide air defense. After returning from China, the regiment and its division became part of the 37th IAK of the 64th (later the 52nd) Fighter Air Defense Army. On the disbandment of the 309th IAD in November 1958, the regiment joined the 297th IAD PVO of the Moscow Air Defense District. This assignment proved brief, as it was disbanded with the 297th on 5 October 1959 during a reorganization of the PVO.
