= 19th meridian west =

Line of longitude

19th meridian west

The meridian 19° west of Greenwich is a line of longitude that extends from the North Pole across the Arctic Ocean, Greenland, Iceland, the Atlantic Ocean, the Southern Ocean, and Antarctica to the South Pole.

The 19th meridian west forms a great circle with the 161st meridian east.

== From Pole to Pole ==
Starting at the North Pole and heading south to the South Pole, the 19th meridian west passes through:

Co-ordinates	Country, territory or sea	Notes
90°0′N 19°0′W	Arctic Ocean	
82°1′N 19°0′W	Greenland	Mainland and several islands, including Prinsesse Thyra Island, Store Koldewey, and Shannon Island
74°28′N 19°0′W	Atlantic Ocean	Greenland Sea
66°11′N 19°0′W	Iceland	
63°25′N 19°0′W	Atlantic Ocean	
60°0′S 19°0′W	Southern Ocean	
72°38′S 19°0′W	Antarctica	Queen Maud Land, claimed by Norway

== See also ==
- 18th meridian west
- 20th meridian west
