= List of Category 1 South Pacific tropical cyclones =

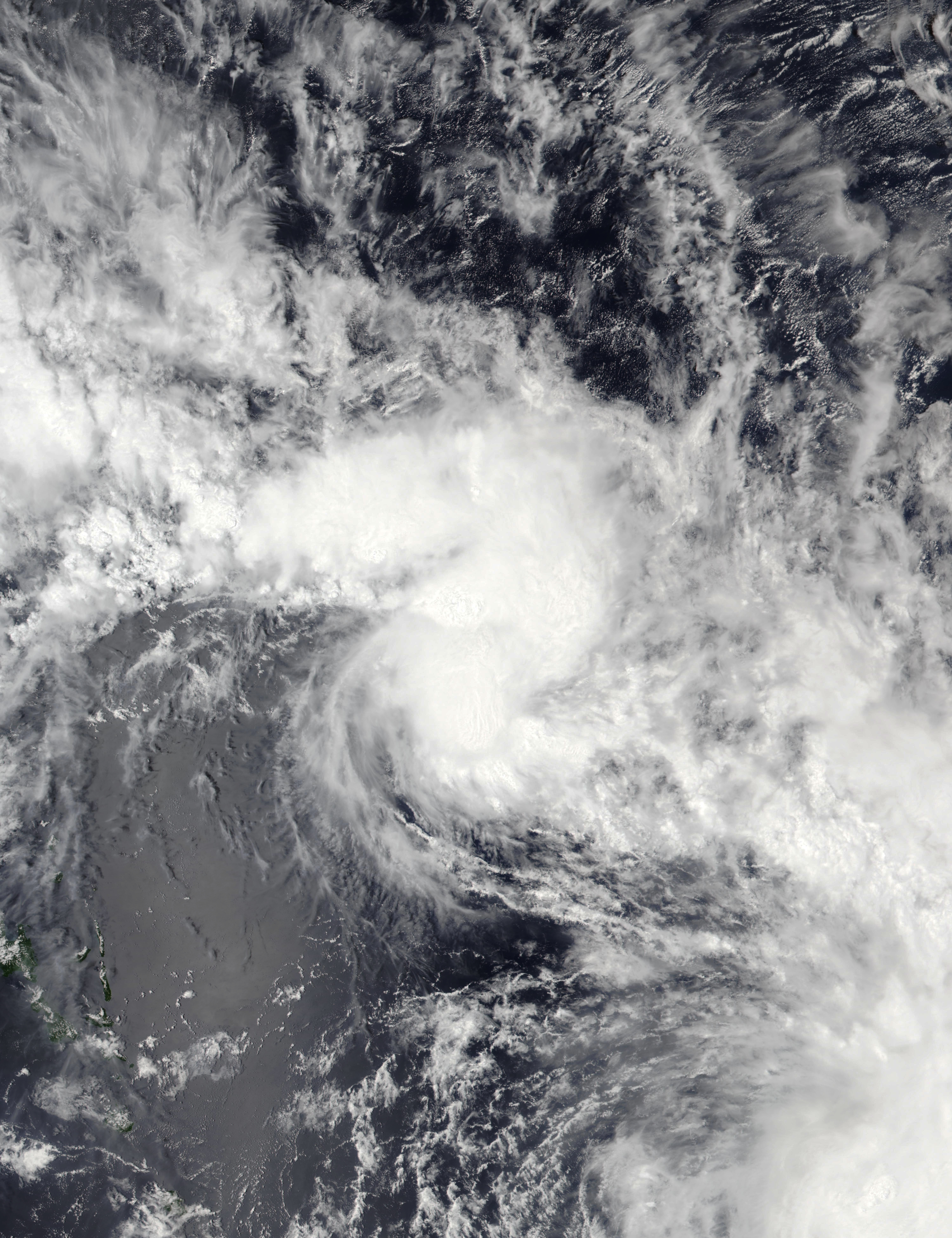
Cyclone Bina

Category 1 is the lowest classification on the Australian tropical cyclone intensity scale and is used to classify tropical cyclones, that have 10-minute sustained winds of 33–47 knots (61–87 km/h; 38–54 mph). As of 2019 tropical cyclones have peaked as Category 1 tropical cyclones in the South Pacific tropical cyclone basin, which is denoted as the part of the Pacific Ocean to the south of the equator and to the east of 160°E. This list does include any tropical cyclones that went on to peak as a Category 4 or 5 severe tropical cyclone, while in the Southern Pacific tropical cyclone basin.

== Background ==
The South Pacific tropical cyclone basin is located to the south of the Equator between 160°E and 120°W. The basin is officially monitored by the Fiji Meteorological Service and the New Zealand MetService, while other meteorological services such as the Australian Bureau of Meteorology, Météo-France as well as the United States Joint Typhoon Warning Center also monitor the basin. Within the basin a Category 3 severe tropical cyclone is a tropical cyclone that has 10-minute mean maximum sustained wind speeds of 64–85 knots (119–157 km/h; 74–98 mph) on the Australian tropical cyclone intensity scale. A named storm could also be classified as a Category 1 tropical cyclone if it is estimated, to have 1-minute mean maximum sustained wind speeds of between 64–82 knots (119–152 km/h; 74–94 mph) on the Saffir–Simpson hurricane wind scale. This scale is only officially used in American Samoa, however, various agencies including NASA also use it to compare tropical cyclones. A Category 3 tropical cyclone is expected to cause catastrophic devastation, if it significantly impacts land at or near its peak intensity.

== Systems ==
=== 1970s ===
Name	Duration	Peak intensity		Areas affected	Damage (USD)	Deaths	Refs
Name	Duration	Wind speed	Pressure	Areas affected	Damage (USD)	Deaths	Refs
Isa	April 13 – 16, 1970	75 km/h (45 mph)	990 hPa (29.23 inHg)	Solomon Islands			
Priscilla	December 15 – 19, 1970	75 km/h (45 mph)	990 hPa (29.23 inHg)	Fiji	Minor	Unknown	
Fiona	February 24 – 27, 1971	75 km/h (45 mph)	990 hPa (29.23 inHg)	Queensland, New Caledonia			
Vivienne	December 17 – 19, 1971	75 km/h (45 mph)	990 hPa (29.23 inHg)	French Polynesia	None	None	
Collette	November 2 – 3, 1972	75 km/h (45 mph)	990 hPa (29.23 inHg)				
Felicity	January 14 – 18, 1973	75 km/h (45 mph)	990 hPa (29.23 inHg)				
Glenda	January 31 – February 1, 1973	75 km/h (45 mph)	990 hPa (29.23 inHg)				
Henrietta	February 28 – March 2, 1973	75 km/h (45 mph)	990 hPa (29.23 inHg)				
SP7301	November 7 – 11, 1973	65 km/h (40 mph)	990 hPa (29.23 inHg)				
Monica	January 15 – 20, 1974	65 km/h (40 mph)	990 hPa (29.23 inHg)				
Nessie	January 17 – 22, 1974	65 km/h (40 mph)	990 hPa (29.23 inHg)				
Hope	March 9 – 19, 1976	75 km/h (45 mph)	990 hPa (29.23 inHg)				
Jan	April 16 – 22, 1976	75 km/h (45 mph)	990 hPa (29.23 inHg)				
Unnamed	February 3 – 9, 1977	75 km/h (45 mph)	990 hPa (29.23 inHg)				
Unnamed	February 20 – 24, 1977	75 km/h (45 mph)	990 hPa (29.23 inHg)				
Tessa	December 5 – 11, 1977	75 km/h (45 mph)	990 hPa (29.23 inHg)	French Polynesia			

=== 1980s ===
Name	Duration	Peak intensity		Areas affected	Damage (USD)	Deaths	Refs
Name	Duration	Wind speed	Pressure	Areas affected	Damage (USD)	Deaths	Refs
Rae	February 3, 1980	75 km/h (45 mph)	990 hPa (29.23 inHg)	Vanuatu			
Wally	April 2 – 7, 1980	75 km/h (45 mph)	995 hPa (29.38 inHg)	Fiji	$2.26 million	18	
Diola
Betsy
Unnamed
Diola
Claudia	May 13–18, 1982	75 km/h (45 mph)	990 hPa (29.23 inHg)	Solomon Islands	None	None	
Kina	November 6 – 13, 1982	75 km/h (45 mph)	990 hPa (29.23 inHg)	None	None	None	
Prema	February 25 – 27, 1983	85 km/h (50 mph)	987 hPa (29.15 inHg)	Cook Islands, French Polynesia	Minor	None	
Atu	December 27–30	85 km/h (50 mph)	987 hPa (29.15 inHg)				
Grace	January 18 – 20, 1984	65 km/h (40 mph)	997 hPa (29.44 inHg)	None	None	None	
Unnamed	February 20 – 24, 1984	85 km/h (50 mph)	987 hPa (29.15 inHg)	None	None	None	
Cyril	March 16 – 21, 1984	85 km/h (50 mph)	987 hPa (29.15 inHg)	Fiji	Minor	None	
Unnamed	March 23 – 30, 1984	75 km/h (45 mph)	990 hPa (29.23 inHg)				
Unnamed	December 26 – 28, 1984	85 km/h (50 mph)	987 hPa (29.15 inHg)		None	None	
Drena	January 9–16, 1985	85 km/h (50 mph)	987 hPa (29.15 inHg)				
Keli
Lusi
Alfred
Veli
Blanch(e)	May 20–27, 1987	75 km/h (45 mph)	990 hPa (29.23 inHg)	Solomon Islands	None	None	
Agi	January 4–14, 1988	65 km/h (40 mph)	995 hPa (29.38 inHg)	Vanuatu, New Caledonia	$500,000	None	
Gina	January 6–9, 1989	85 km/h (50 mph)	987 hPa (29.15 inHg)	Samoan Islands	$5 million		
Meena	May 1–10, 1989	85 km/h (50 mph)	990 hPa (29.23 inHg)	Cape York Peninsula	Minor	None	

=== 1990s ===
Name	Duration	Peak intensity		Areas affected	Damage (USD)	Deaths	Refs
Name	Duration	Wind speed	Pressure	Areas affected	Damage (USD)	Deaths	Refs
Nancy
Hettie	March 23 – 29, 1992	85 km/h (50 mph)	987 hPa (29.15 inHg)	French Polynesia	Minimal	None	
Mick	February 3–9, 1993	85 km/h (50 mph)	987 hPa (29.15 inHg)	Tonga, Fiji, New Zealand	Minimal	None	
Oli	February 16–19, 1993	75 km/h (45 mph)	990 hPa (29.23 inHg)				
Gertie	December 24, 1995	75 km/h (45 mph)	990 hPa (29.23 inHg)	None	None	None	
Yasi	January 12–19, 1996	85 km/h (50 mph)	987 hPa (29.15 inHg)	Fiji, Tonga	Minor	None	
Zaka	March 9–11, 1996	65 km/h (40 mph)	993 hPa (29.32 inHg)	New Caledonia	Minor	None	
Atu	March 10–13, 1996	85 km/h (50 mph)	987 hPa (29.15 inHg)	New Caledonia	Minor	None	
Cyril	November 23–26, 1996	85 km/h (50 mph)	987 hPa (29.15 inHg)	Solomon Islands, New Caledonia			
Ian	April 13–19, 1997	85 km/h (50 mph)	987 hPa (29.15 inHg)	Fiji	None	Minimal	
Tui	January 24 – 27, 1998	75–85 km/h (45–50 mph)	990 hPa (29.23 inHg)	Samoa, American Samoa	$850,000	1	
Alan	April 17–26, 1998	75 km/h (45 mph)	992 hPa (29.29 inHg)	French Polynesia		10	
Bart	April 28 – May 5, 1998	85 km/h (50 mph)	987 hPa (29.15 inHg)	French Polynesia	Minor	10	
Ella	February 11–13, 1999	85 km/h (50 mph)	985 hPa (29.09 inHg)	Solomon Islands, Vanuatu, New Caledonia			
Gita	February 27 – March 2, 1999	85 km/h (50 mph)	990 hPa (29.23 inHg)	None	None	None	

=== 2000s ===
Name	Duration	Peak intensity		Areas affected	Damage (USD)	Deaths	Refs
Name	Duration	Wind speed	Pressure	Areas affected	Damage (USD)	Deaths	Refs
Neil	April 13–17, 2000	75 km/h (45 mph)	992 hPa (29.29 inHg)	Fiji	None	None	
Rita	February 27 – March 5, 2001	85 km/h (50 mph)	986 hPa (29.12 inHg)				
Trina	November 29 – December 3, 2001	65 km/h (40 mph)	995 hPa (29.38 inHg)	Cook Islands, French Polynesia	$52,000	0	
Vicky	December 22–26	65 km/h (40 mph)	995 hPa (29.38 inHg)	None	None	0	
Yolande	November 29 – December 6, 2002	65 km/h (40 mph)	995 hPa (29.38 inHg)	Tonga	None	None	
Cilla	January 27–29, 2003	75 km/h (45 mph)	995 hPa (29.38 inHg)	Fiji, Tonga	Minimal	None	
Judy	December 21–27, 2004	85 km/h (50 mph)	987 hPa (29.15 inHg)				
Lola	January 27 – February 2, 2005	75 km/h (45 mph)	990 hPa (29.23 inHg)				
Rae	February 27–6, 2005	75 km/h (45 mph)	990 hPa (29.23 inHg)				
Sheila	April 20–22, 2005	75 km/h (45 mph)	990 hPa (29.23 inHg)				
Tam	January 6–14, 2006	85 km/h (50 mph)	987 hPa (29.15 inHg)				
Hettie	January 24–31, 2009	65 km/h (40 mph)	995 hPa (29.38 inHg)				
Innis	February 13 – 18, 2009	75 km/h (45 mph)	990 hPa (29.23 inHg)	Vanuatu, New Caledonia	Unknown	Unknown	

=== 2010s ===
Name	Duration	Peak intensity		Areas affected	Damage (USD)	Deaths	Refs
Name	Duration	Wind speed	Pressure	Areas affected	Damage (USD)	Deaths	Refs
Nisha	January 26 – 31, 2010	75 km/h (45 mph)	990 hPa (29.23 inHg)	Samoan Islands, Southern Cook Islands			
Sarah	February 17 – March 3, 2010	65 km/h (40 mph)	995 hPa (29.38 inHg)	Cook Islands			
Haley	February 7 – 11, 2013	75 km/h (45 mph)	990 hPa (29.23 inHg)	Cook Islands			
June	January 13 – 19, 2014	75 km/h (45 mph)	990 hPa (29.23 inHg)	Solomon Islands, New Caledonia, New Zealand			
Mike	March 12 – 20, 2014	65 km/h (40 mph)	990 hPa (29.23 inHg)	Cook Islands			
Reuben	March 19 – 23, 2015	75 km/h (45 mph)	990 hPa (29.23 inHg)	Fiji, Tonga	Unknown	Unknown	
Tuni	November 26 – 30, 2015	75 km/h (45 mph)	992 hPa (29.29 inHg)	Tuvalu, Samoan Islands, Niue, Tonga	Unknown	Unknown	
Yalo	February 24 – 26, 2016	75 km/h (45 mph)	993 hPa (29.32 inHg)	Cook Islands, French Polynesia	Unknown	Unknown	
Bart	February 19 – 22, 2017	75 km/h (45 mph)	994 hPa (29.35 inHg)	Southern Cook Islands	Unknown	Unknown	

== 2020s ==
Name	Duration	Peak intensity		Areas affected	Damage (USD)	Deaths	Refs
Name	Duration	Wind speed	Pressure	Areas affected	Damage (USD)	Deaths	Refs
Fehi	January 26 – 30, 2018	85 km/h (50 mph)	985 hPa (29.09 inHg)	New Caledonia, New Zealand	Unknown	Unknown	
Iris	March 20 – 24, 2018	75 km/h (45 mph)	993 hPa (29.32 inHg)	Solomon Islands	Unknown	Unknown	
Josie	March 29 – April 2, 2018	75 km/h (45 mph)	993 hPa (29.32 inHg)	Vanuatu, Fiji, Tonga	Unknown	Unknown	
Liua	September 26 – 28, 2018	75 km/h (45 mph)	994 hPa (29.35 inHg)	Solomon Islands	Unknown	Unknown	
Neil	February 9 – 10, 2019	65 km/h (40 mph)	994 hPa (29.35 inHg)	Wallis and Futuna, Fiji, Tonga	Unknown	Unknown	
Vicky	February 19 – 24, 2020	75 km/h (45 mph)	990 hPa (29.23 inHg)	Samoan Islands, Niue	Unknown	Unknown	
Bina	January 29 – February 1, 2021	65 km/h (40 mph)	995 hPa (29.38 inHg)	Solomon Islands, Vanuatu, Fiji	Unknown	Unknown	
13F	April 9 – 11, 2021	65 km/h (40 mph)	995 hPa (29.4 inHg)	New Caledonia	Unknown	Unknown	
Eva	February 26 – March 5, 2022	65 km/h (40 mph)	995 hPa (29.38 inHg)	Vanuatu, New Caledonia	Unknown	Unknown	
Gina	May 16 – 21, 2022	75 km/h (45 mph)	998 hPa (29.47 inHg)	Vanuatu	Minimal	Unknown	
Osai	February 6 – 12, 2024	85 km/h (50 mph)	991 hPa (29.26 inHg)	Samoan Islands, Southern Cook Islands	None	None	
Pita	January 9 – 12, 2025	65 km/h (40 mph)	994 hPa (29.35 inHg)	Fiji, Niue, Southern Cook Islands	Unknown	Unknown	
Tam	April 14 – 16, 2025	85 km/h (50 mph)	986 hPa (29.12 inHg)	Fiji, Vanuatu	Unknown	Unknown	

== Other systems ==
Tropical Cyclone Raquel (2014) and Tropical Cyclone Linda (2018) developed into Category 1 tropical cyclones, as they moved out of the basin and into the Australian Region.

== See also ==
- List of Category 1 Atlantic hurricanes
- List of Category 1 Pacific hurricanes
