= 162nd meridian west =

Line of longitude

162nd meridian west

The meridian 162° west of Greenwich is a line of longitude that extends from the North Pole across the Arctic Ocean, North America, the Pacific Ocean, the Southern Ocean, and Antarctica to the South Pole.

The 162nd meridian west forms a great circle with the 18th meridian east.

== From Pole to Pole ==
Starting at the North Pole and heading south to the South Pole, the 162nd meridian west passes through:

Co-ordinates	Country, territory or sea	Notes
90°0′N 162°0′W	Arctic Ocean	
71°40′N 162°0′W	Chukchi Sea	
70°18′N 162°0′W	United States	Alaska
67°2′N 162°0′W	Chukchi Sea	Hotham Inlet
66°37′N 162°0′W	United States	Alaska — Baldwin Peninsula
66°35′N 162°0′W	Chukchi Sea	Kotzebue Sound
66°3′N 162°0′W	United States	Alaska — Seward Peninsula
64°42′N 162°0′W	Bering Sea	Norton Sound
63°27′N 162°0′W	United States	Alaska
59°49′N 162°0′W	Bering Sea	Kuskokwim Bay
59°14′N 162°0′W	United States	Alaska
59°10′N 162°0′W	Bering Sea	Kuskokwim Bay
58°41′N 162°0′W	United States	Alaska — Cape Newenham
58°37′N 162°0′W	Bering Sea	Bristol Bay
55°48′N 162°0′W	United States	Alaska — Alaska Peninsula
55°5′N 162°0′W	Pacific Ocean	Passing just west of the Iliasik Islands, Alaska, United States (at 55°4′N 161°58′W); Passing just west of the island of Nīhoa, Hawaii, United States (at 23°4′N 161°56′W); Passing just east of Palmyra Atoll, United States Minor Outlying Islands (at 5°53′N 162°3′W)
60°0′S 162°0′W	Southern Ocean	
78°5′S 162°0′W	Antarctica	Ross Dependency, claimed by New Zealand

== See also ==
- 161st meridian west
- 163rd meridian west
