= 161st meridian west =

Line of longitude

161st meridian west

The meridian 161° west of Greenwich is a line of longitude that extends from the North Pole across the Arctic Ocean, North America, the Pacific Ocean, the Southern Ocean, and Antarctica to the South Pole.

The 161st meridian west forms a great circle with the 19th meridian east.

== From Pole to Pole ==
Starting at the North Pole and heading south to the South Pole, the 161st meridian west passes through:

Co-ordinates	Country, territory or sea	Notes
90°0′N 161°0′W	Arctic Ocean	
71°37′N 161°0′W	Chukchi Sea	
70°21′N 161°0′W	United States	Alaska
64°51′N 161°0′W	Bering Sea	Norton Bay
64°33′N 161°0′W	United States	Alaska
64°15′N 161°0′W	Bering Sea	Norton Sound - passing just east of Besboro Island, Alaska, United States (at 64°7′N 161°17′W)
63°37′N 161°0′W	United States	Alaska — mainland and Hagemeister Island
58°33′N 161°0′W	Bering Sea	Bristol Bay
56°1′N 161°0′W	United States	Alaska — Kudobin Islands and Alaska Peninsula
55°26′N 161°0′W	Pacific Ocean	Passing just west of Unga Island, Alaska, United States (at 55°19′N 160°51′W); Passing just east of Rakahanga atoll, Cook Islands (at 10°1′S 161°4′W)
10°22′S 161°0′W	Cook Islands	Manihiki atoll
10°26′S 161°0′W	Pacific Ocean	
60°0′S 161°0′W	Southern Ocean	
78°2′S 161°0′W	Antarctica	Ross Dependency, claimed by New Zealand

== See also ==
- 160th meridian west
- 162nd meridian west
