= 161st meridian east =

Line of longitude

161st meridian east

The meridian 161° east of Greenwich is a line of longitude that extends from the North Pole across the Arctic Ocean, Asia, the Pacific Ocean, the Southern Ocean, and Antarctica to the South Pole.

The 161st meridian east forms a great circle with the 19th meridian west.

== From Pole to Pole ==
Starting at the North Pole and heading south to the South Pole, the 161st meridian east passes through:

Co-ordinates	Country, territory or sea	Notes
90°0′N 161°0′E	Arctic Ocean	
76°6′N 161°0′E	East Siberian Sea	Passing between the Medvyezhi Islands, Sakha Republic, Russia (at 70°50′N 161°0′E)
69°35′N 161°0′E	Russia	Sakha Republic; Chukotka Autonomous Okrug — from 68°16′N 161°0′E; Magadan Oblast — from 65°10′N 161°0′E
60°54′N 161°0′E	Sea of Okhotsk	Penzhin Bay
59°42′N 161°0′E	Russia	Kamchatka Krai — Kamchatka Peninsula
54°35′N 161°0′E	Pacific Ocean	Passing just east of Ujelang Atoll, Marshall Islands (at 9°46′N 160°59′E)
8°38′S 161°0′E	Solomon Islands	Island of Malaita
9°16′S 161°0′E	Solomon Sea	Passing just east of the island of Guadalcanal, Solomon Islands (at 9°51′S 160°50′E)
11°37′S 161°0′E	Coral Sea	
28°18′S 161°0′E	Pacific Ocean	
60°0′S 161°0′E	Southern Ocean	
70°19′S 161°0′E	Antarctica	Ross Dependency, claimed by New Zealand

== See also ==
- 160th meridian east
- 162nd meridian east
