= 162nd meridian east =

Line of longitude

162nd meridian east

The meridian 162° east of Greenwich is a line of longitude that extends from the North Pole across the Arctic Ocean, Asia, the Pacific Ocean, the Southern Ocean, and Antarctica to the South Pole.

The 162nd meridian east forms a great circle with the 18th meridian west.

== From Pole to Pole ==
Starting at the North Pole and heading south to the South Pole, the 162nd meridian east passes through:

Co-ordinates	Country, territory or sea	Notes
90°0′N 162°0′E	Arctic Ocean	
75°51′N 162°0′E	East Siberian Sea	Passing between the Medvyezhi Islands, Sakha Republic, Russia (at 70°40′N 162°0′E)
69°33′N 162°0′E	Russia	Sakha Republic; Chukotka Autonomous Okrug — from 68°21′N 162°0′E; Magadan Oblast — from 64°48′N 162°0′E
61°22′N 162°0′E	Sea of Okhotsk	Penzhin Bay
60°26′N 162°0′E	Russia	Kamchatka Krai — Kamchatka Peninsula
55°55′N 162°0′E	Pacific Ocean	
54°58′N 162°0′E	Russia	Kamchatka Krai — Kamchatka Peninsula
54°42′N 162°0′E	Pacific Ocean	Passing just west of Enewetak atoll, Marshall Islands (at 11°30′N 162°5′E); Passing just east of the island of Ulawa, Solomon Islands (at 9°42′S 161°59′E); Passing just east of the island of Malaupaina, Solomon Islands (at 10°14′S 161°59′E)
10°29′S 162°0′E	Solomon Islands	Island of Makira
10°48′S 162°0′E	Coral Sea	
27°28′S 162°0′E	Pacific Ocean	
60°0′S 162°0′E	Southern Ocean	Passing just west of Young Island, Balleny Islands, claimed by New Zealand (at 66°20′S 162°7′E)
70°23′S 162°0′E	Antarctica	Ross Dependency, claimed by New Zealand

== See also ==
- 161st meridian east
- 163rd meridian east
