= 160th meridian east =

Line of longitude

160th meridian east (interactive map)

The meridian 160° east of Greenwich is a line of longitude that extends from the North Pole across the Arctic Ocean, Asia, the Pacific Ocean, the Southern Ocean, and Antarctica to the South Pole.

The 160th meridian east forms a great circle with the 20th meridian west.

In Antarctica, the meridian defines the border between the Australian Antarctic Territory and the Ross Dependency.

== From Pole to Pole ==
Starting at the North Pole and heading south to the South Pole, the 160th meridian east passes through:

Co-ordinates	Country, territory or sea	Notes
90°0′N 160°0′E	Arctic Ocean	
76°20′N 160°0′E	East Siberian Sea	
70°26′N 160°0′E	Russia	Sakha Republic
70°9′N 160°0′E	East Siberian Sea	
69°45′N 160°0′E	Russia	Sakha Republic; Chukotka Autonomous Okrug — from 68°15′N 160°0′E; Magadan Oblast — from 65°31′N 160°0′E
61°47′N 160°0′E	Sea of Okhotsk	Shelikhov Gulf
61°22′N 160°0′E	Russia	Magadan Oblast
60°57′N 160°0′E	Sea of Okhotsk	Shelikhov Gulf
59°11′N 160°0′E	Russia	Kamchatka Krai — Kamchatka Peninsula
54°7′N 160°0′E	Pacific Ocean	
53°15′N 160°0′E	Russia	Kamchatka Krai — Kamchatka Peninsula
53°6′N 160°0′E	Pacific Ocean	Passing just east of Mokil atoll, Federated States of Micronesia (at 6°42′N 159°46′E); Passing just east of Santa Isabel Island, Solomon Islands (at 8°33′S 159°54′E)
8°53′S 160°0′E	Solomon Islands	Nggela Islands
8°55′S 160°0′E	Ironbottom Sound	
9°25′S 160°0′E	Solomon Islands	Guadalcanal Island
9°49′S 160°0′E	Solomon Sea	
11°28′S 160°0′E	Solomon Islands	Rennell Island
11°35′S 160°0′E	Coral Sea	
29°9′S 160°0′E	Pacific Ocean	
60°0′S 160°0′E	Southern Ocean	
69°44′S 160°0′E	Antarctica	Border between the Australian Antarctic Territory, claimed by Australia, and the Ross Dependency, claimed by New Zealand

== See also ==
- 159th meridian east
- 161st meridian east
