= 164th =

164th is the ordinal form of the number 164. 164th or One hundred and sixty-fourth may also refer to:

- A fraction, 1/164, equal to one of 164 equal parts

== Geography ==
- 164th meridian east, a line of longitude
- 164th meridian west, a line of longitude

== Military ==
- 164th Brigade (disambiguation)
- 164th Division (disambiguation)
- 164th Regiment (disambiguation)

== See also ==
- 164
- June 13, 164th day of the year in a standard year
