= 163rd =

163rd is the ordinal form of the number 163. 163rd or One hundred and sixty-third may also refer to:

- A fraction, 1/163, equal to one of 163 equal parts

== Geography ==
- 163rd meridian east, a line of longitude
- 163rd meridian west, a line of longitude

== Military ==
- 163rd Brigade (disambiguation)
- 163rd Division (disambiguation)
- 163rd Regiment (disambiguation)

== See also ==
- June 12, 163rd day of the year in a standard year
