= 15th meridian =

15th meridian may refer to:

- 15th meridian east, a line of longitude east of the Greenwich Meridian
- 15th meridian west, a line of longitude west of the Greenwich Meridian
