= 17th meridian =

17th meridian may refer to:

- 17th meridian east, a line of longitude east of the Greenwich Meridian
- 17th meridian west, a line of longitude west of the Greenwich Meridian
