= Voice of Croatia =

International broadcasting service of Croatia

Glas Hrvatske
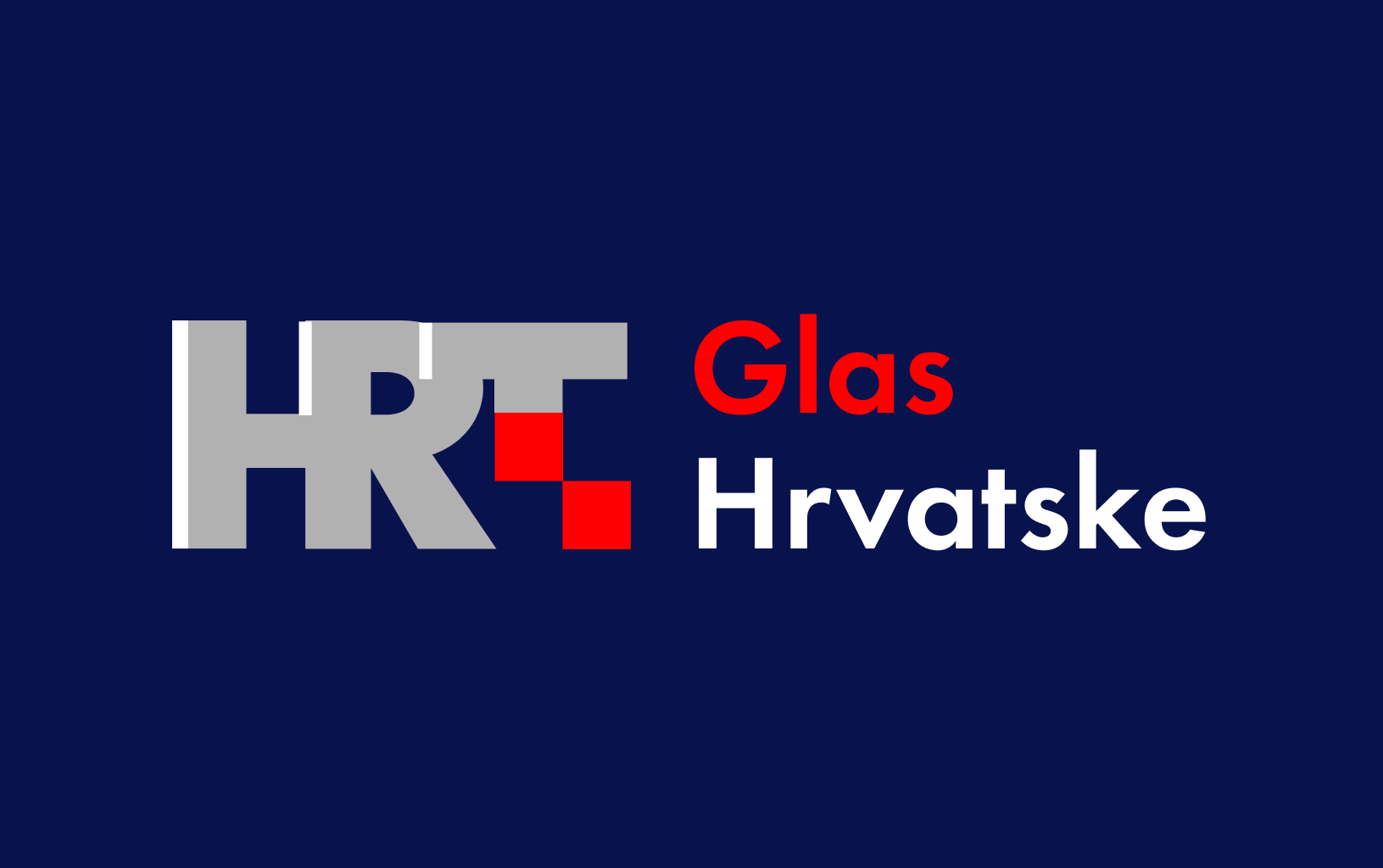
- Zagreb; Croatia
- Broadcast area: Worldwide

Programming
- Language: Croatian

Ownership
- Owner: Croatian Radio (Croatian Government)
- Sister stations: HR1; HR2; HR3; Radio Sljeme; Radio Rijeka; Radio Pula; Radio Osijek; Radio Split; Radio Zadar; Radio Knin; Radio Dubrovnik

Links
- Website: Voice of Croatia

The International Programme of Croatian Radio "Voice of Croatia" (Croatian: Međunarodni program Hrvatskoga radija "Glas Hrvatske") is the international service of Croatian state radio via satellite and Internet.

The programme is for Croatians living abroad, Croatia's minority groups, and the international community. While mostly in Croatian, news and segments of up to 15 minutes duration are broadcast in English, German, Italian, Hungarian, and Spanish at different times of the day.

== History ==
On January 1, 2013, Voice of Croatia ceased broadcasting over shortwave and also stopped transmitting from Zadar on AM (1134 kHz, covering Europe) on January 1, 2014. Prior to leaving shortwave, transmitters in Germany were rented to reach audiences in the Americas, while the Pacific region was covered for four hours daily via the relay station in Singapore.

== Satellite broadcasts ==
The Voice of Croatia broadcasts 24 hours a day via the following satellites:

- In Europe, North Africa, the Middle East on the Eutelsat 13C at 13°E and Eutelsat 16A at 16 degrees east for Central and East Europe.

== Previous shortwave frequencies ==
As logged in November 2010:

- 3985 kHz (21:30–06:00 UTC for Europe)
- 6165 kHz (06:00–08:00 and 15:00–21:30 UTC for Europe)
- 7370 kHz (08:00–15:00 UTC for Europe)
- 7375 kHz (23:00–04:00 UTC for South America; 00:00–06:00 UTC for North America)
- 17860 kHz (07:00–11:00 UTC for Australia)

== See also ==
- Croatian Radiotelevision
- List of radio stations in Croatia
- List of international radio broadcasters
