= 163rd meridian =

163rd meridian may refer to:

- 163rd meridian east, a line of longitude east of the Greenwich Meridian
- 163rd meridian west, a line of longitude west of the Greenwich Meridian

163rd meridian west	163rd meridian east
