= 16th meridian =

16th meridian may refer to:

- 16th meridian east, a line of longitude east of the Greenwich Meridian
- 16th meridian west, a line of longitude west of the Greenwich Meridian
