= 165th meridian =

165th meridian may refer to:

- 165th meridian east, a line of longitude east of the Greenwich Meridian
- 165th meridian west, a line of longitude west of the Greenwich Meridian

165th meridian west	165th meridian east
