= 165th Division =

165th Division may refer to:

- 165th Division (People's Republic of China)
- 165th Rifle Division, Soviet Union

== See also ==
- List of military divisions by number
- 165th Brigade (disambiguation)
- 165th Regiment (disambiguation)
- 165th Squadron (disambiguation)
- 165th (disambiguation)
