= Croatian Radio =

Official broadcasting service of Croatia

Hrvatski radio
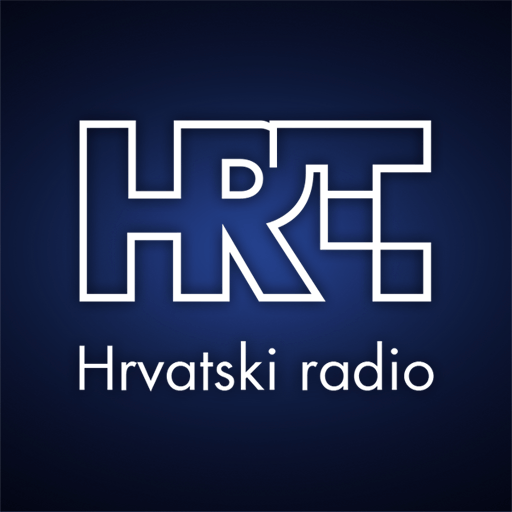
- Type: Radio network
- Country: Croatia

Programming
- Language(s): Croatian; English; German; Spanish

Ownership
- Owner: Croatian Radiotelevision
- Key people: Eliana Čandrlić Glibota, editor-in-chief

History
- Launch date: 15 May 1926; 100 years ago
- Former names: Radio Zagreb (1926–1940; 1945–1990); Hrvatski krugoval (1940–1945)

Coverage
- Availability: National & international

Links
- Website: Croatian Radio

Croatian Radio (Croatian: Hrvatski radio) is the official broadcasting service of Croatia. Founded on May 15, 1926 as Zagreb Radio, it's the first radio station in all of Southeast Europe. Part of Croatian Radiotelevision, it operates three national stations, several regional branches and an international service.

The broadcast, which began with just one channel that could be listened to only in Zagreb and northern Croatia, today makes 16 radio channels sent out on FM, DAB+, satellite and the Internet.

On May 25, 2012, the television and radio program archive and a collection of music production were given the status of Croatia's cultural heritage.

== History ==
"Halo, halo, ovdje Radio Zagreb" (Halo, halo, Radio Zagreb here) – Božena Begović's voice, on May 15, 1926, the beginning of broadcasting

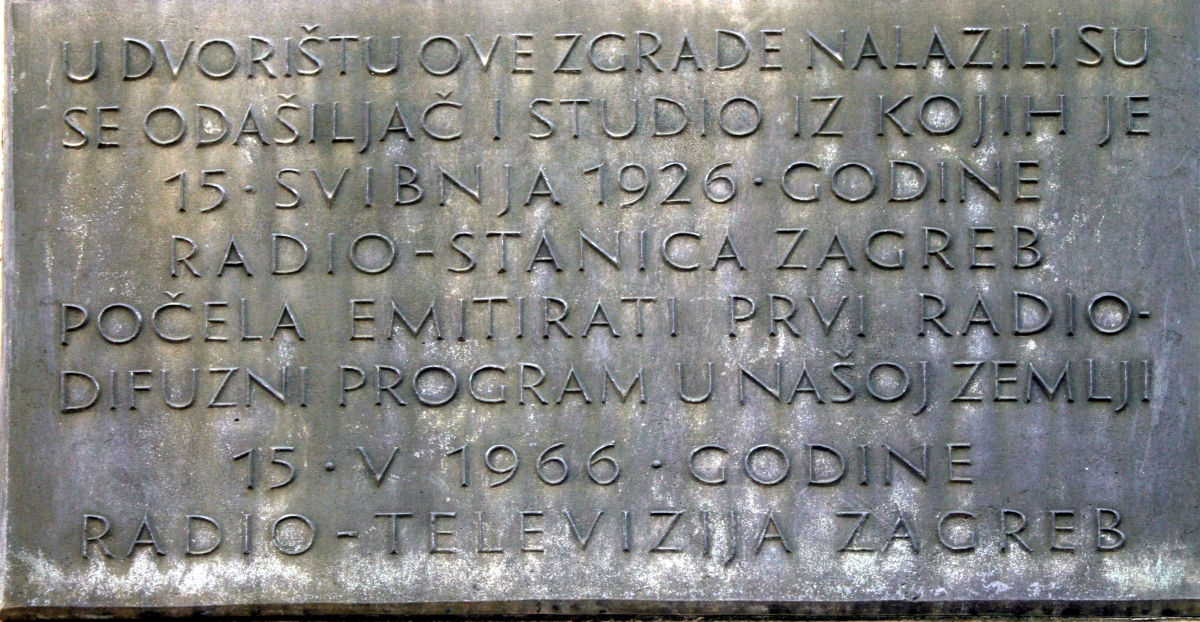
Memorial plaque on the building on 9 St. Mark's Square in Zagreb

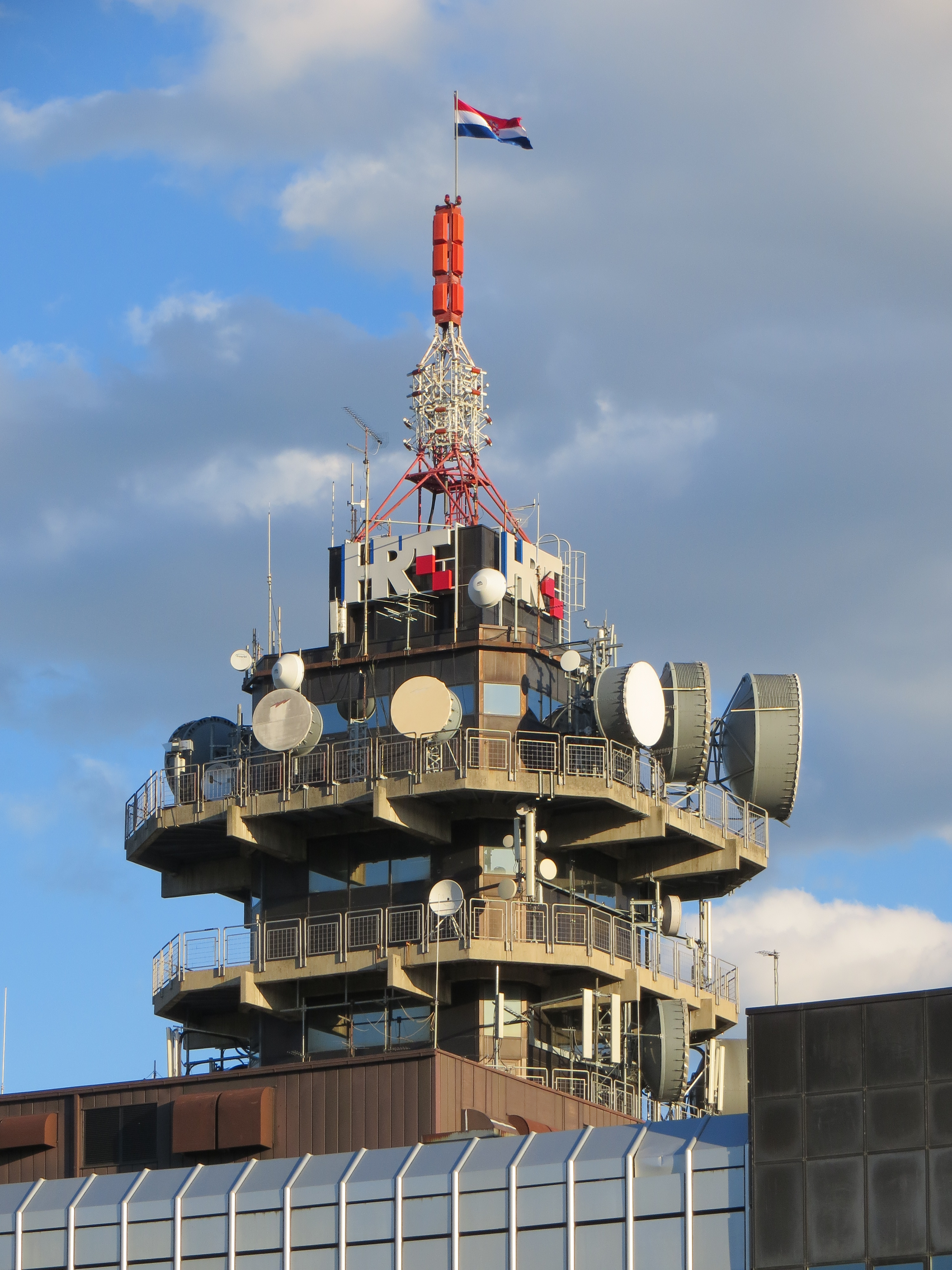
HRT Broadcasting Centre, Prisavlje (2013)

The beginning of Croatian radio date back to 1926, when the broadcasting of Radio Zagreb began. It was founded by the Radio Club Zagreb which was made up of more than 130 distinguished radio amateurs and businessmen from Zagreb and other parts of Croatia led by the Croatian physicist Oton Kučera. It was the first radio station in all of Southeast Europe. It started broadcasting on May 15, 1926, on a 350m mid-wave from the headquarters on St. Mark's Square in Zagreb.

The program began at 8:30 p.m. with the sounds of the Croatian anthem - Lijepa naša domovino, played by Krsto Odak on the piano, followed by an announcement read by speaker Božena Begović and a speech by director Dr. Ivo Stern. In November 1926, Radio Zagreb began with on-site broadcasts by directly broadcasting cultural, sports, religious and other events from Zagreb and other Croatian cities.

For the first 14 years, it was privately owned by the Radio Zagreb Joint Stock Company. In 1940, it was nationalized, and after 1945 it acted as a state-owned enterprise, social enterprise, public enterprise and finally since 1990 a public institution.

In 1927 it joined the broadcasts of the EUREF Permanent Network and started joint broadcasts with radios in Vienna, Prague, Warsaw, and Budapest. On the basis of this cooperation, Radio Zagreb was admitted in 1928 to full membership of the International Broadcasting Union, representing the Kingdom of Serbs, Croats and Slovenes.

At the end of 1926, Radio Zagreb had just over 4,000 subscribers (more than one million in 1976). The period from the late 1920s to the mid-1930s was marked by a decline in the purchase of radio receivers and a stalemate of programmatic and technical progress, caused by the global economic crisis. The lag behind its progress was somewhat offset in the era of Banovina of Croatia when it was relocated to more suitable premises in 116 Vlaška Street and when modern technical equipment was purchased and transmitter power increased (from 0.7 to 4.5 kW). Due to the low power of transmitters and geographical obstacles (Učka, Velebit, Dinara, Biokovo mountains), the range of broadcast was still limited to Northwestern Croatia. That is why branch stations in Dubrovnik, Sarajevo and Banja Luka (1942), Osijek (1943), and Split and Rijeka (1945) were founded.

After World War II, branch stations in other major Croatian cities were launched as well. The programmatic restructuring of Radio Zagreb was carried out in 1964 and since then its three separate radio channels: Radio Zagreb 1, Radio Zagreb 2, and Radio Zagreb 3 have been broadcasting regularly. The first channel started broadcasting around the clock in 1976, and in 1997, the second and third channels and Radio Sljeme followed. The first medium-wave transmitter of more than 100 kW was installed in 1949 in Deanovac, the first of more than 1000 kW on Rasinovac near Zadar in 1986, while the first ultra-short transmitter (FM) was built on Sljeme in 1957.

== National programs ==
National station logos

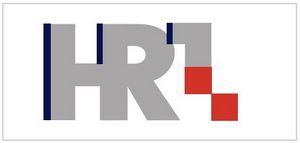
First channel (HR 1)

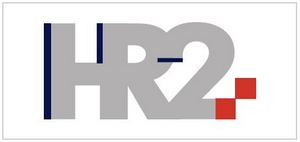
Second channel (HR 2)

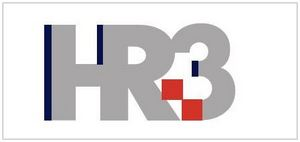
Third channel (HR 3)

=== First channel ===
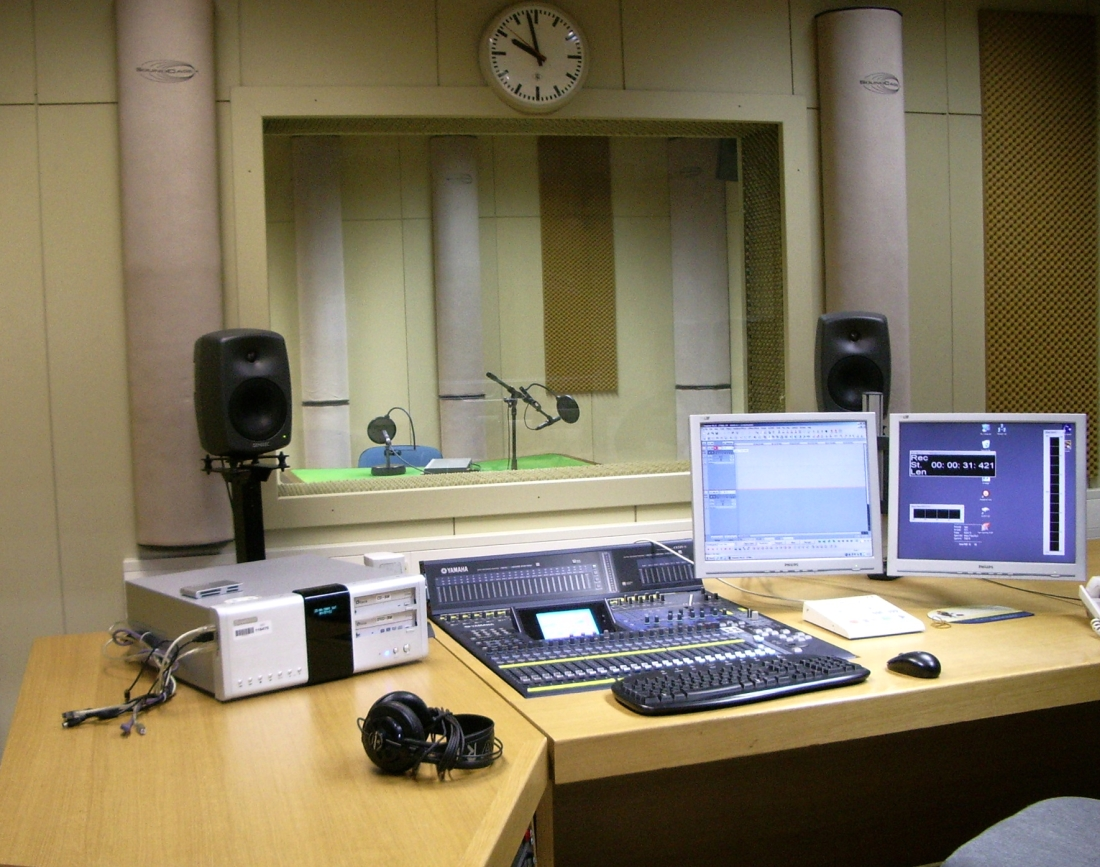
One of Croatian radio's studios

The First channel of Croatian Radio (HR 1) is structured as a national channel that broadcasts information important to Croatian citizens and the state. The backbone of HR 1 is a spoken content - informative, cultural, scientific, educational, children's, and religious - which keeps abreast of all events in society and culture in Croatia and the world. Music is featured in special music shows that cover topics from the music world as well as in music charts that are integral to talk-shows. In the music section, HR 1 broadcasts classical, entertaining and folk music.

It broadcasts in five program units: night, morning, early afternoon, afternoon and evening. Daily news is broadcast at 3 pm, Dnevnik at 7 pm and The Chronicle of the Day at 10 pm. News is broadcast every full hour. HR 1 also broadcast specialized content for larger interest groups such as shows for farmers, sailors and Croatian diaspora. These include documentaries, radio dramas and cultural and sports broadcasts.

=== Second channel ===
The Second channel of Croatian Radio (HR 2) began broadcasting in April 1964 from 7 am to 7:30 pm (in the evening, the Third channel was broadcasting on the same frequency). It was imagined as a more casual channel complementary to the First channel with entertainment live shows, on-site broadcasts, contact shows, modeled in collaboration with other European radio stations like Radio Luxembourg and Radio Monte Carlo.

It has been broadcasting around the clock since May 15, 1989, when the Third channel received its own radio frequency, and Vojo Šiljak and his associates started editing evening program Na Drugom super. In 2013, it became a national radio network with entertainment and sports content, speech broadcasts that accompany daily events, culture, art, and science, as well as own production with a focus on social life. Additionally, branch stations present information of wider public interest from the region on the HR 2.

Program concept follows people's daily rhythm: in the morning, HR 2 broadcasts announcements of daily events, with priority is given to national topics, service information on weather and traffic (regular and extraordinary reports of the Croatian Auto Club on road conditions are broadcast throughout the day), announcements on the functioning of public services, presentation of minority topics (gender, ethnic and other minority groups) and the work of NGOs etc. The afternoon program begins with the show The Second Part of the Day, which broadcasts about current events, and continues with music shows edited by renowned Croatian critics and with the participation of Croatian musicians. In the evening, HR 2 usually broadcasts sporting events. Contemporary Croatian and foreign pop and rock music are broadcast throughout the day.

=== Third channel ===
The Third channel of Croatian Radio (HR 3) was founded by editor Hrvoje Lisinski and members of the first editorial board Duško Car, Nedjeljko Kujundžić and Branko Polić in 1964. Its basis is a talk and music program of more serious content from social, scientific and cultural fields, with analytical and in-depth work on the elaboration of particular topics and expressed critical discourse. The music part of the program is marked by classical, jazz and alternative music. HR 3 also broadcasts world music events and live concerts.

== Regional branch stations ==
Croatian radio has eight regional branch stations - Radio Dubrovnik, Radio Knin, Radio Osijek, Radio Pula, Radio Rijeka, Radio Sljeme (Zagreb region), Radio Split and Radio Zadar - which deal with public needs of the area in which they broadcast, encourage the resolution of local utility and other problems, initiate public dialogue through contact shows and focus on local news.

== International channels ==
The Voice of Croatia (Glas Hrvatske) channel broadcasts 24 hours a day via the Internet and satellites for Croatian diaspora and the international public. In English, German and Spanish. It informs the audience about current events in Croatia with plenty of content from other radio channels. In Europe, North Africa, the Middle East on the Eutelsat 16A at 16 degrees east.

== See also ==
- Radio in Croatia
- List of radio stations in Croatia
