= 164th meridian =

164th meridian may refer to:

- 164th meridian east, a line of longitude east of the Greenwich Meridian
- 164th meridian west, a line of longitude west of the Greenwich Meridian

164th meridian west	164th meridian east
