= Time in Tonga =

Tonga is a sovereign state in Polynesia that wholly utilises UTC+13:00 year round.

Tonga does not currently observe daylight saving time, though they did in the Southern Hemisphere summers between 1999 and 2002 as well as the 2016—2017 summer, utilising UTC+14:00. UTC+14:00 is the earliest time zone on Earth and so, when using daylight saving time, Tonga was one of the first regions of Earth to bring in a new year. UTC+14:00 was also used by Samoa as DST (see Time in Samoa) and is currently used by Kiribati's Line Islands.

Tonga currently shares a year-round time zone with Samoa, Tokelau and the Phoenix Islands whilst New Zealand shares Tonga's time seasonally. Tonga is west of the International Date Line (IDL) which deviates east from its standard course following the 180th meridian to roughly the 165th meridian west to traverse east of Tonga and other surrounding land.
