= 165th =

165th is the ordinal form of the number 165. 165th or One hundred and sixty-fifth may also refer to:

- A fraction, 1/165, equal to one of 165 equal parts

== Geography ==
- 165th meridian east, a line of longitude
- 165th meridian west, a line of longitude

== Military ==
- 165th Brigade (disambiguation)
- 165th Division (People's Republic of China)
- 165th Rifle Division, Red Army
- 165th Regiment (disambiguation)

== See also ==
- June 14, 165th day of the year in a standard year
