= 163rd Division =

163rd Division may refer to:

- 163rd Division (1st Formation) (People's Republic of China)
- 163rd Infantry Division (Wehrmacht), Germany
- 163rd Rifle Division, Soviet Union

== See also ==
- List of military divisions by number
- 163rd Brigade (disambiguation)
- 163rd Regiment (disambiguation)
- 163rd Squadron (disambiguation)
- 163rd (disambiguation)
