= Verkhoturov Island =

Island in the Bering Sea

Native name: Остров Верхотурова
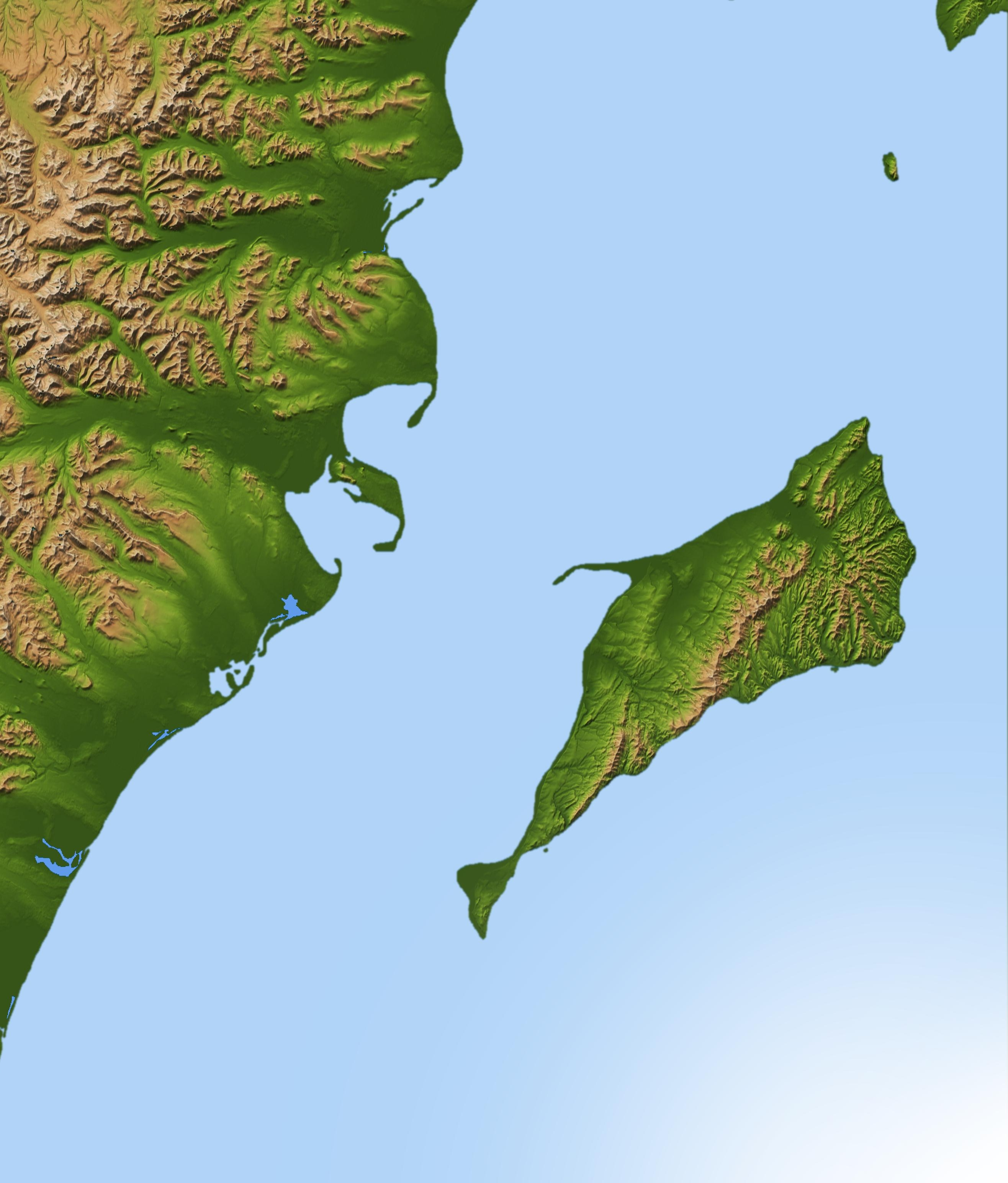
- Verkhoturov Island is the small island in the top right

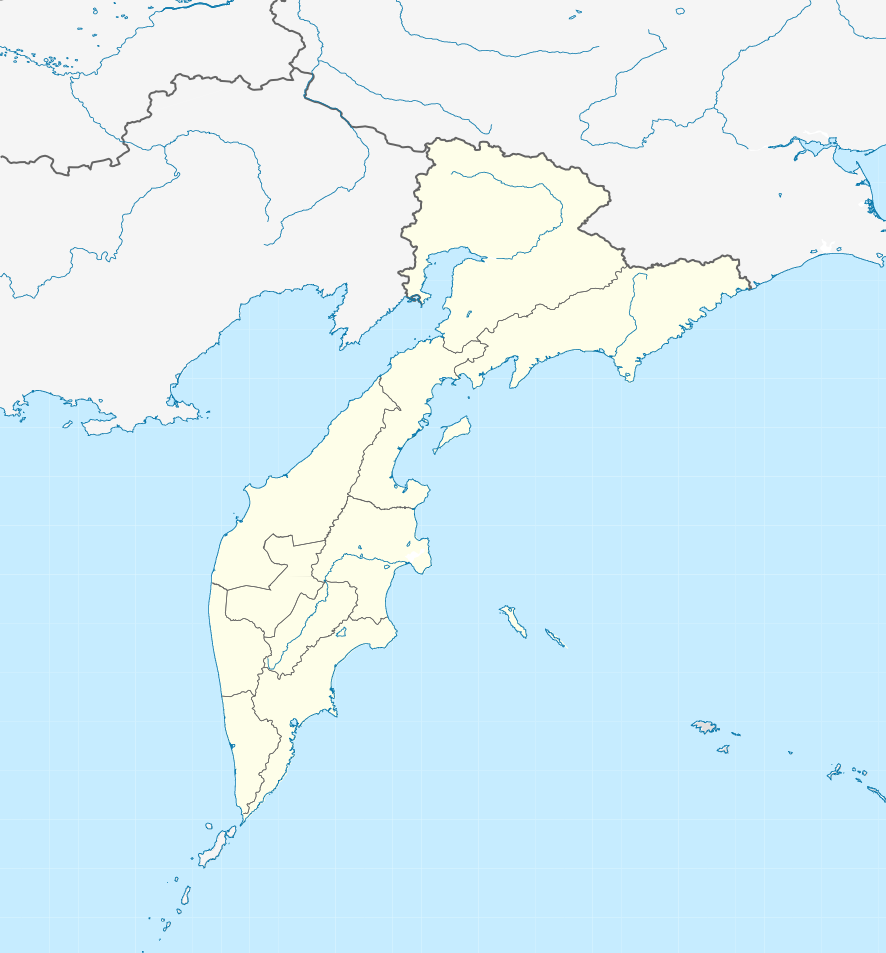
- Location within Kamchatka Krai Location within Russia

Geography
- Location: Karaginsky Gulf of the Bering Sea
- Coordinates: 59°36′43″N 164°40′0″E
- Length: 3.5 km (2.17 mi)
- Width: 0.5 km (0.31 mi)
- Coastline: 6.4 km (3.98 mi)
- Highest elevation: 367 m (1204 ft)

Administration
- Russia
- Krai: Kamchatka Krai

Demographics
- Population: 0

Additional information
- Time zone: Kamchatka Time (UTC+12)

Verkhoturov Island (Russian: остров Верхотурова, romanized: ostrov Verkhoturova), also known as Maly Karaginsky (Малый Карагинский) and Chachame (Чачамэ), is a Russian island in the Karaginsky Gulf of the Bering Sea. It is located between Karaginsky Island and the Kamchatka Peninsula.

== Geography ==
Verkhoturov Island is located in the Litke Strait 39.2 kilometers (24.4 mi) north of Cape Golenishchev on Karaginsky Island and 21 kilometers (13 mi) south of Cape Ilpinsky on the Kamchatka Peninsula. The island is 3.5 kilometers (2.2 mi) long and 0.5 kilometers (0.31 mi) with a 6.4-kilometer-long (4 mi) rocky coastline.

Verkhoturov Island has three mountain peaks, the highest of which reaches an elevation of 367 meters (1,204 ft). The north is low with a sandy beach. The south descends into plateau with a steep coastline at Cape Yuzhny. The island's capes have sea stacks and reefs.

== History ==
Verkhoturov Island was discovered by Russian sailors around the late 17th to early 18th centuries. The island was named after Protopopov Verkhoturov, who died in 1705 while collecting yasak from Koryak people on Karaginsky Island. The island's first recorded mention was made by Stepan Krasheninnikov and Georg Wilhelm Steller during their Great Northern Expedition of 1733 to 1743.

Russian navigator Friedrich Benjamin von Lütke first surveyed Verkhoturov Island in 1828. Russian naturalist Alexander Postels, who accompanied von Lütke, recorded sighting huts and ruined yurts on the island with "traces of visits by the Alyutors and Kamchadals" ("следы посещений олютор и камчадал") who hunted silver foxes on the island. Russian Pacific walrus hunters regularly visited Verkhoturova Island during the 1920s and 1930s. Arefy Kornilovich Komarov, one such hunter from Shkotovo who died, was buried on the northwestern tip of Verkhoturova Island in 1937.

== Administration ==
Verkhoturov Island administered as a part Kamchatka Krai in Russia. The island has been uninhabited since at least von Lütke's 1828 survey with "no reliable evidence" ("впрочем, достоверных фактов") that it was inhabited before the survey.

Verkhoturov Island is a part of the Koryak Nature Reserve. In 1976, the island was declared to be a "complex nature reserve of regional significance" ("комплексным заказником областного значения"). In 1981, a resolution by the Kamchatka Regional Council of the People's Deputies declared the island to be a natural monument to preserve its wildlife population. It was a zoological reserve from 1983 to 2002.

== Wildlife ==
Scientists of the Biology and Soil Institute of the Far Eastern Scientific Center of the Academy of Sciences of the Soviet Union and the All-Union Research Institute of Hunting and Fur Farming first described Verkhoturov Island's flora and fauna in 1975. Mammals that inhabit Verkhoturov Island include silver foxes and Kamchatka brown bears. Birds include tufted and horned puffins, common and thick-billed murres, common eider, and least auklets. Pacific walruses, Steller sea lions, and lionfish inhabit the island's surrounding waters. The Kamchatka Red Data Book lists 258 species of vascular plants that populate the island.

In 1928, six arctic foxes were released onto Verkhoturov Island by the Kamchatka Joint-Stock Company and they soon established a population on the island. By the 1960s, all arctic foxes had left the island after migrating to the Kamchatka Peninsula during winters.
