= 164th Regiment =

164th Regiment may refer to:

- 164th Regiment (United States), modern U.S. Army regiment
- 164th New York Infantry Regiment, a Union regiment in the American Civil War
- 164th Ohio Infantry Regiment, a Union regiment in the American Civil War

== See also ==
- 164th Division (disambiguation)
