= 164th Division =

164th Division may refer to:

- 164th Division (1st formation) (People's Republic of China), 1948–1949
- 164th Division (2nd formation) (People's Republic of China), 1950–1952
- 164th Infantry Division (People's Republic of China), 1985–1998, previously the 164th Army Division, 1970–1985
- 164th Infantry Division (Wehrmacht), Germany
- 164th Rifle Division, Soviet Union

== See also ==
- List of military divisions by number
- 164th Brigade (disambiguation)
- 164th Regiment (disambiguation)
- 164th Squadron (disambiguation)
- 164th (disambiguation)
