= 164th Brigade =

164th Brigade may refer to:

China

- 164th Marine Brigade

Russia

- 164th Motor Rifle Brigade

Ukraine

- 164th Radio Technical Brigade

United Kingdom

- 164th (North Lancashire) Brigade
- 164th (Rotherham) Howitzer Brigade, Royal Field Artillery

United States

- 164th Air Defense Artillery Brigade

== See also ==
- 164th Division (disambiguation)
- 164th Regiment (disambiguation)
