= UTC+13:00 =

Identifier for a time offset from UTC of +13

- Time zone
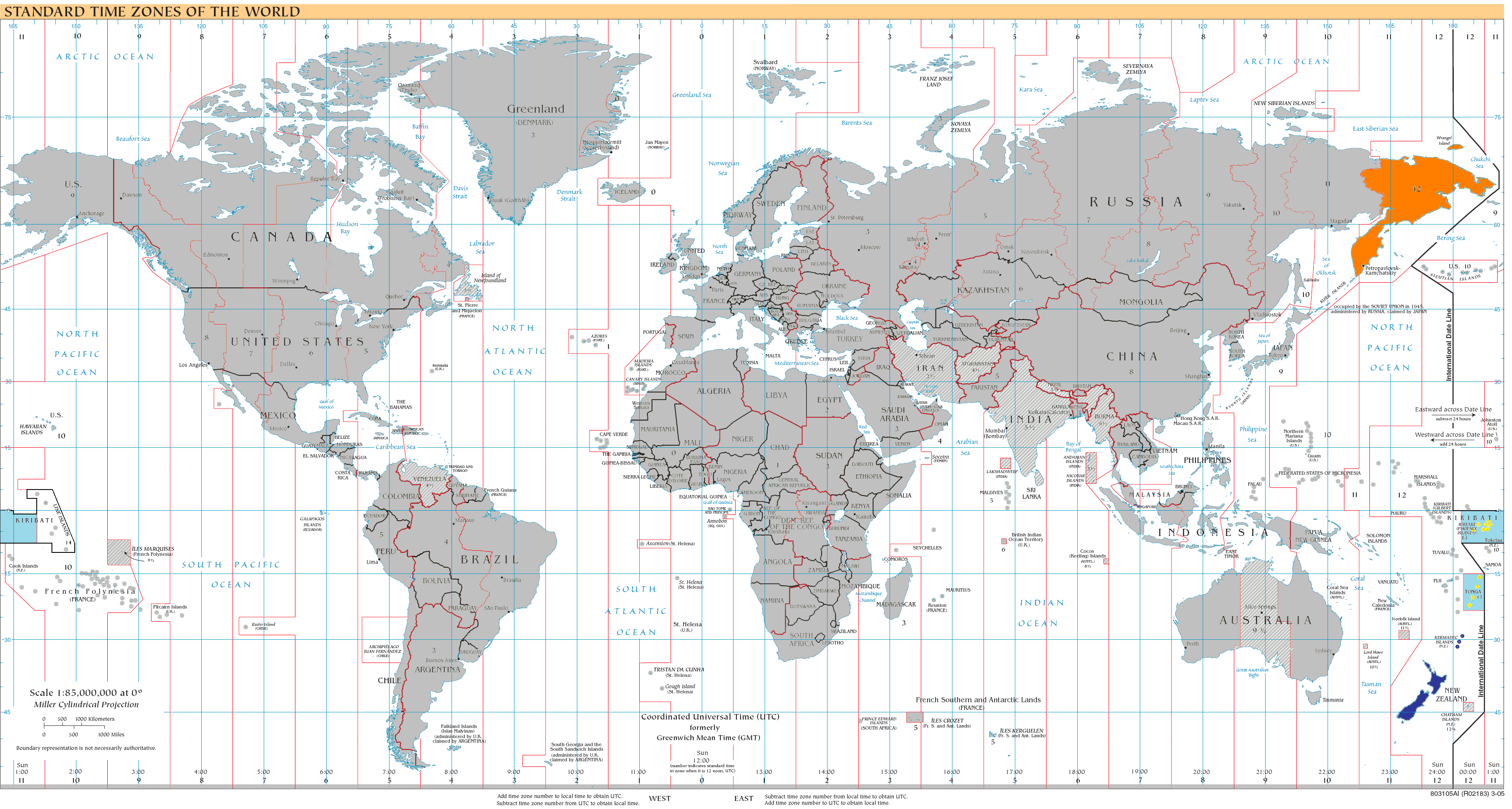
- World map with the time zone highlighted

UTC offset
- UTC: UTC+13:00

Current time
- 23:32, 6 June 2026 UTC+13:00 [refresh]

Central meridian
- 165 degrees W

UTC+13:00 is an identifier for a time offset from UTC of +13:00. Because it does not contain any land in the Northern Hemisphere, this time zone is exclusive to the Southern Hemisphere.

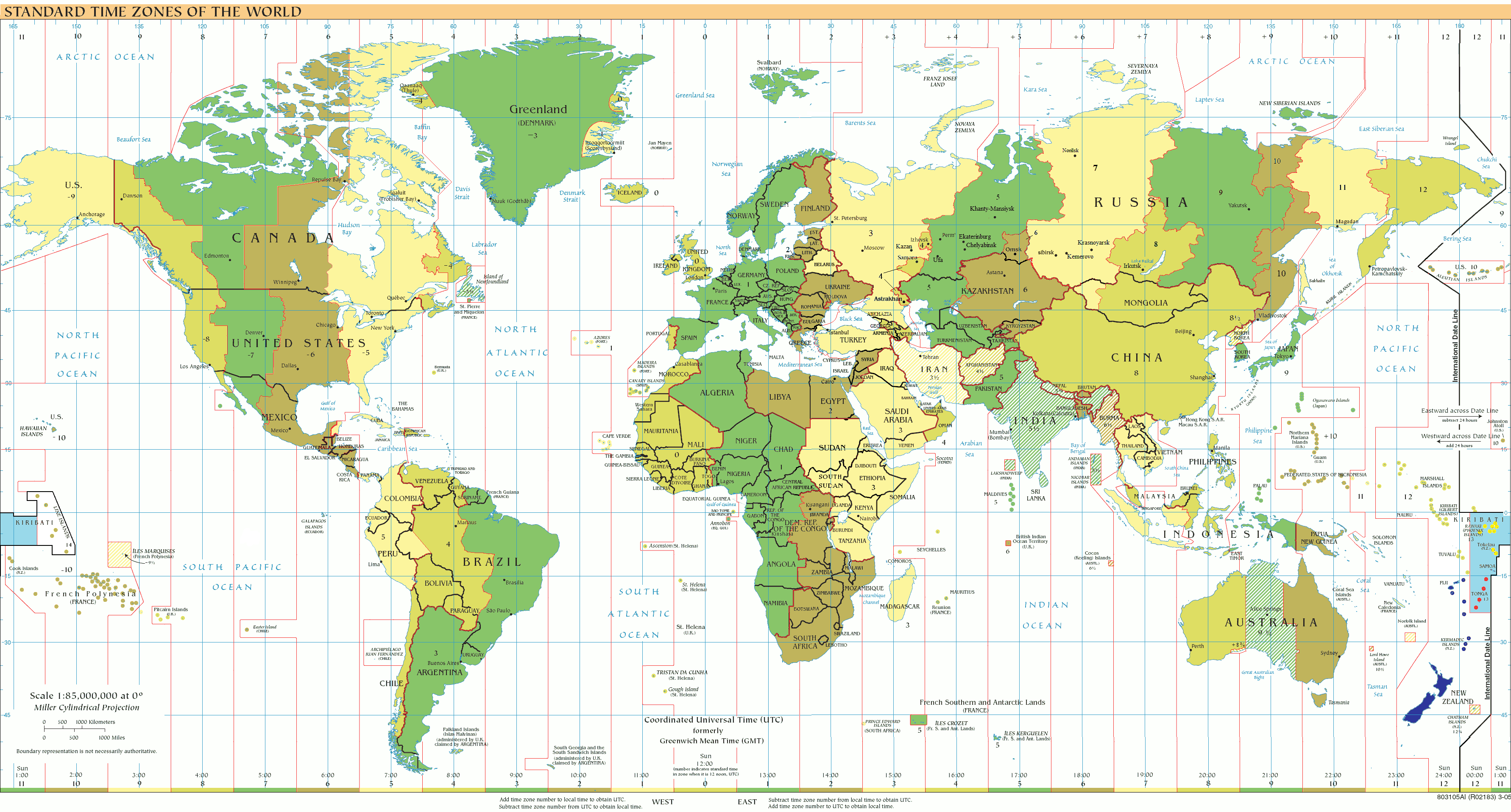
UTC+13:00: blue (December), orange (June), yellow (year-round), light blue (sea areas)

== As standard time (year-round) ==
Principal cities: Apia, Atafu, Nukuʻalofa

=== Oceania ===
==== Micronesia ====
- Kiribati
  - Phoenix Islands

==== Polynesia ====
- New Zealand
  - Tokelau – Time in Tokelau
- Samoa – Time in Samoa
- Tonga – Time in Tonga

== As daylight saving time (Southern Hemisphere summer) ==
Principal cities: Auckland, Christchurch, Wellington

=== Oceania ===
==== Australasia ====
- New Zealand (except Chatham Islands) – New Zealand Daylight Time

=== Antarctica ===
- Some research bases in Antarctica, in particular the South Pole and the McMurdo Station. At New Year, these places are the first in the world to see the Sun, which is then visible at midnight.

== History ==
Kiribati introduced a change for its eastern half on 31 December 1994, from time zones UTC−11:00 and UTC−10:00 to UTC+13:00 and UTC+14:00, to avoid having the country divided by the International Date Line.

Tonga has been on UTC+13:00 for many years. Daylight saving time was used in the southern summer seasons from October 1999 to January 2002, and from November 2016 to January 2017.

UTC+13:00 was used until 2009 as a daylight time (summer in Northern Hemisphere) in the easternmost parts of Russia (Chukotka and Kamchatka) that used Kamchatka Time.

At the end of 29 December 2011 (UTC−10:00), Samoa advanced its standard time from UTC−11:00 to UTC+13:00 (and its daylight saving time from UTC−10:00 to UTC+14:00), essentially moving the international date line to the other side of the country, skipping 30 December 2011. Following Samoa's decision, Tokelau also simultaneously advanced its standard time (used without daylight saving time), from UTC−11:00 to UTC+13:00.

Fiji, where normal time is UTC+12:00, decides year by year whether it will observe DST, and if so for which dates, which are usually a short period between November or December and January. No DST has been observed since 2020–2021.

== See also ==
- Time in Fiji
- Time in New Zealand
- Time in Russia
- Time in Samoa
- UTC−11:00, which is exactly one day behind UTC+13:00.
- UTC−12:00, the last time zone to start a new day
