= 164th meridian east =

Line of longitude

164th meridian east

The meridian 164° east of Greenwich is a line of longitude that extends from the North Pole across the Arctic Ocean, Asia, the Pacific Ocean, the Southern Ocean, and Antarctica to the South Pole.

The 164th meridian east forms a great ellipse with the 16th meridian west.

== From Pole to Pole ==
Starting at the North Pole and heading south to the South Pole, the 164th meridian east passes through:

Co-ordinates	Country, territory or sea	Notes
90°0′N 164°0′E	Arctic Ocean	
75°22′N 164°0′E	East Siberian Sea	
69°44′N 164°0′E	Russia	Chukotka Autonomous Okrug; Kamchatka Krai — from 64°52′N 164°0′E
62°37′N 164°0′E	Sea of Okhotsk	Penzhin Bay
61°40′N 164°0′E	Russia	Kamchatka Krai — Kamchatka Peninsula
60°1′N 164°0′E	Bering Sea	Karaginsky Gulf
59°2′N 164°0′E	Russia	Kamchatka Krai — Karaginsky Island
58°44′N 164°0′E	Bering Sea	
56°0′N 164°0′E	Pacific Ocean	
10°29′S 164°0′E	Coral Sea	
20°5′S 164°0′E	New Caledonia	
20°16′S 164°0′E	Coral Sea	
25°46′S 164°0′E	Pacific Ocean	
60°0′S 164°0′E	Southern Ocean	
70°32′S 164°0′E	Antarctica	Ross Dependency, claimed by New Zealand
74°48′S 164°0′E	Southern Ocean	Ross Sea
77°42′S 164°0′E	Antarctica	Ross Dependency, claimed by New Zealand

== See also ==
- 163rd meridian east
- 165th meridian east
