= Litke Strait =

Strait in the Bering Sea

Coordinates: 59°N 163.4169444°E

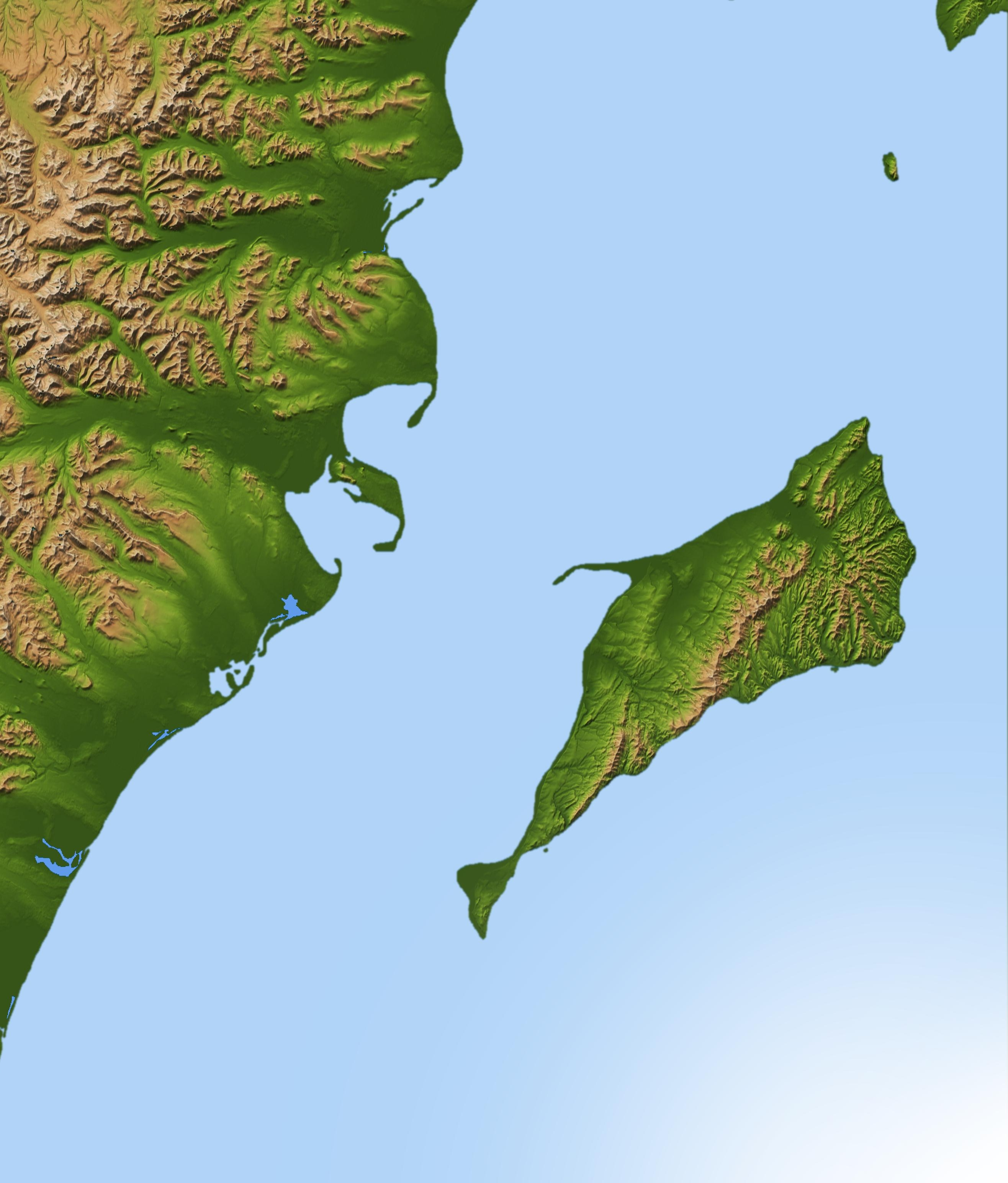
Litke Strait

Litke Strait (Russian: Пролив Литке, Proliv Litke) is a strait in the Karaginsky Gulf in the Bering Sea, located off the northeastern coast of the Kamchatka Peninsula, in Kamchatka Krai of the Russian Far East. It separates the Karaginsky Island from the peninsula's mainland.

The strait is named after explorer Fyodor Petrovich Litke.

== See also ==
- Verkhoturov Island
