= Radio Student =

Croatia
- Broadcast area: Zagreb
- Frequency: 100.5 MHz

Programming
- Format: Varied

Ownership
- Owner: Faculty of Political Sciences, University of Zagreb

History
- First air date: November 1996

Links
- Webcast: Official live stream, aac 128kbps
- Website: www.radiostudent.hr

Radio Student (100.5 MHz FM) is the first student radio station in Croatia, broadcasting since 1996 in Zagreb. The station is non-profit, non-commercial, serving as an educational radio for students of Zagreb University. It is located at the Faculty of Political Sciences, which is licensed to broadcast to a part of the city of Zagreb.

== Programming ==
The program focused on students, student issues, education and creativity as well as new trends and modern lifestyles as appropriate to Radio Student's target audience. News is edited by the students of journalism themselves. Talk shows and magazines include topics on education, culture, art, science, ecology, society, politics, etc. Music is very varied, covering various genres and interests with specialized One–Man shows in the afternoons and evenings. The show's annual birthday is celebrated each year with a club event.

== Web streaming ==
Radio Student offers a wide range of online streaming possibilities. Available streams include Windows Media Video (camera from the main control room), Windows Media Audio, RealVideo, RealAudio as well as full spectrum of AAC and aacPlus streams, currently the highest quality audio streaming technology. Streams are provided in cooperation with CARNET (Croatian Academic and Research Network).

== Mobile streaming ==
Radio Student is also the first station in Croatia that can be listened to on mobile phones.

== See also ==
- List of radio stations in Croatia
