= Ivo Stern =

Croatian lawyer and writer (1889–1961)

- Born: 24 December 1889; Zagreb, Austro-Hungarian Empire (now Croatia)
- Died: 1961 (aged 72); Chiavari, Italy
- Education: University of Zagreb
- Occupations: Writer, journalist, lawyer

Dr. Ivo Stern (24 December 1889 – 1961) was a Croatian lawyer, writer, journalist, director and founder of the "Zagreb Radiostation" (now Croatian Radiotelevision).

Stern was born to a wealthy Jewish family on 24 December 1889 in Zagreb. He studied and graduated at the Faculty of Law at the University of Zagreb in 1913. After graduation, he practiced the law for a while. After World War I, in which he participated as a soldier in the Austro-Hungarian Army, Stern lived in Vienna. In 1926 as the head of the Zagreb group of bankers and industrials, despite the opposition from Belgrade, Stern founded the "Zagreb Radiostation". Stern was first director and major shareholder of the "Zagreb Radiostation". He was also the program editor until 1938. Stern was close friend of Croatian writer Milan Begović.

Stern was educated, spoke multiple languages, and was financially independent. He associated with many Croatian writers, and his apartment in Jurišićeva street was a venue for banquets. He was a member of the Croatian Freemasonry and founded the Rotary Club, which had a predominantly Masonic membership.

Stern wrote left pacifist oriented emphatic expressive poetry, which was published in the magazine "Plamen". He also wrote political feuilletons. One of his feuilletons was devoted to the problem of the Jewish diaspora in the new post-war Europe, for which he was criticized and accused that he represents the Jewish messianism of Bolsheviks, Leon Trotsky and Béla Kun.

In the eve of World War II, Stern changed his surname to Globnik and moved to Italy where he died in 1961.

== Bibliography ==
- Snješka Knežević, Aleksander Laslo (2011). Židovski Zagreb. Zagreb: AGM, Židovska općina Zagreb. ISBN 978-953-174-393-8.
