= 163rd Brigade =

163rd Brigade may refer to:

- 163rd Infantry Brigade, United Kingdom
- 163rd Armored Brigade, United States

== See also ==
- 163rd Division (disambiguation)
- 163rd Regiment (disambiguation)
