= 163rd meridian east =

Line of longitude

163rd meridian east

The meridian 163° east of Greenwich is a line of longitude that extends from the North Pole across the Arctic Ocean, Asia, the Pacific Ocean, the Southern Ocean, and Antarctica to the South Pole.

The 163rd meridian east forms a great circle with the 17th meridian west.

This longitude is the western limit of the Auckland Oceanic flight information region.

== From Pole to Pole ==
Starting at the North Pole and heading south to the South Pole, the 163rd meridian east passes through:

Co-ordinates	Country, territory or sea	Notes
90°0′N 163°0′E	Arctic Ocean	
75°37′N 163°0′E	East Siberian Sea	
69°39′N 163°0′E	Russia	Chukotka Autonomous Okrug; Magadan Oblast — from 64°39′N 163°0′E; Kamchatka Krai — from 64°11′N 163°0′E
61°32′N 163°0′E	Sea of Okhotsk	Penzhin Bay
60°46′N 163°0′E	Russia	Kamchatka Krai — Kamchatka Peninsula
58°56′N 163°0′E	Bering Sea	Karaginsky Gulf
57°50′N 163°0′E	Russia	Kamchatka Krai — Kamchatka Peninsula
57°27′N 163°0′E	Bering Sea	Ozernoy Bay
56°43′N 163°0′E	Russia	Kamchatka Krai — Kamchatka Peninsula
56°1′N 163°0′E	Pacific Ocean	
5°22′N 163°0′E	Federated States of Micronesia	Island of Kosrae
5°16′N 163°0′E	Pacific Ocean	Passing just east of Sikaiana atoll, Solomon Islands (at 8°24′S 162°57′E)
10°42′S 163°0′E	Coral Sea	
26°37′S 163°0′E	Pacific Ocean	
60°0′S 163°0′E	Southern Ocean	
66°42′S 163°0′E	Balleny Islands	Buckle Island, claimed by New Zealand
66°49′S 163°0′E	Southern Ocean	
70°33′S 163°0′E	Antarctica	Ross Dependency, claimed by New Zealand
75°30′S 163°0′E	Southern Ocean	Ross Sea
77°4′S 163°0′E	Antarctica	Ross Dependency, claimed by New Zealand

== See also ==
- 162nd meridian east
- 164th meridian east
