= 17th meridian west =

Line of longitude

17th meridian west

The meridian 17° west of Greenwich is a line of longitude that extends from the North Pole across the Arctic Ocean, Greenland, Iceland, the Atlantic Ocean, Africa, the Southern Ocean, and Antarctica to the South Pole.

The 17th meridian west forms a great circle with the 163rd meridian east.

== From Pole to Pole ==
Starting at the North Pole and heading south to the South Pole, the 17th meridian west passes through:

Co-ordinates	Country, territory or sea	Notes
90°0′N 17°0′W	Arctic Ocean	
81°28′N 17°0′W	Greenland	
80°10′N 17°0′W	Atlantic Ocean	Greenland Sea — passing just east of Shannon Island, Greenland (at 75°7′N 17°19′W)
66°12′N 17°0′W	Iceland	
63°47′N 17°0′W	Atlantic Ocean	
32°49′N 17°0′W	Portugal	Island of Madeira
32°39′N 17°0′W	Atlantic Ocean	Passing just west of the island of Tenerife, Spain (at 28°20′N 16°55′W); Passing just east of the island of La Gomera, Spain (at 28°6′N 17°5′W)
21°28′N 17°0′W	Western Sahara	Ras Nouadhibou peninsula — claimed by Morocco and the Sahrawi Republic
21°7′N 17°0′W	Mauritania	Ras Nouadhibou peninsula
21°3′N 17°0′W	Atlantic Ocean	
15°4′N 17°0′W	Senegal	
14°25′N 17°0′W	Atlantic Ocean	
60°0′S 17°0′W	Southern Ocean	
72°33′S 17°0′W	Antarctica	Queen Maud Land, claimed by Norway

== See also ==
- 16th meridian west
- 18th meridian west
