= 163rd Division (1st Formation) (People's Republic of China) =

163rd Division (1948–1951)
- Active: 1948.11 - 1951.3
- Country: People's Republic of China
- Branch: People's Liberation Army
- Type: Division
- Role: Infantry
- Engagements: Chinese Civil War

The 163rd Division(Chinese: 第163师) was created in November 1948 under the Regulation of the Redesignations of All Organizations and Units of the Army, issued by Central Military Commission on November 1, 1948, basing on the 14th Independent Division of Northeastern People's Liberation Army, formed in September.

The division was under direct control of Northeastern Military Region. Under the flag of 163rd division it took part in the Chinese Civil War. By 1950 the 489h Regiment formed part of the division.

In November 1951 the division was disbanded.

As of disbandment the division was composed of:

- 487th Regiment;
- 488th Regiment;
- 489th Regiment.
