= 17th meridian east =

Line of longitude

17th meridian east (interactive map)

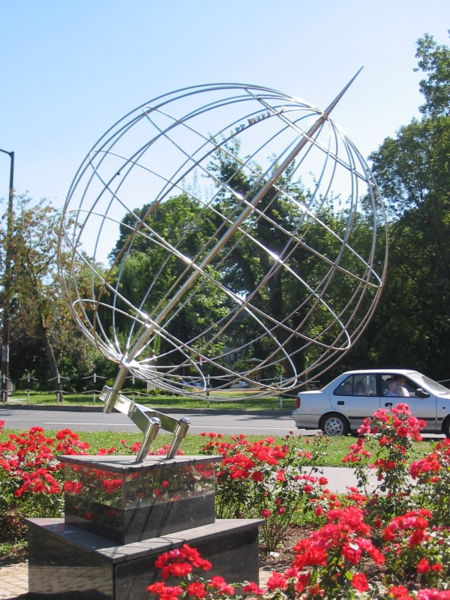
17th eastern longitude monument in Nagykanizsa, Hungary

The meridian 17° east of Greenwich is a line of longitude that extends from the North Pole across the Arctic Ocean, Europe, Africa, the Atlantic Ocean, the Southern Ocean, and Antarctica to the South Pole.

The 17th meridian east forms a great circle with the 163rd meridian west.

== From Pole to Pole ==
Starting at the North Pole and heading south to the South Pole, the 17th meridian east passes through:

Co-ordinates	Country, territory or sea	Notes
90°0′N 17°0′E	Arctic Ocean	
79°57′N 17°0′E	Norway	Island of Spitsbergen, Svalbard
76°36′N 17°0′E	Atlantic Ocean	Norwegian Sea
69°24′N 17°0′E	Norway	Islands of Senja and Rolla, and the mainland
67°59′N 17°0′E	Sweden	Passing through Nyköping at 58°45'N just before leaving land.
58°37′N 17°0′E	Baltic Sea	
57°19′N 17°0′E	Sweden	Island of Öland
57°6′N 17°0′E	Baltic Sea	
54°38′N 17°0′E	Poland	Passing through Wrocław and just east of Poznań
50°25′N 17°0′E	Czech Republic	For about 14km
50°18′N 17°0′E	Poland	For about 9km
50°13′N 17°0′E	Czech Republic	
48°39′N 17°0′E	Slovakia	Passing just west of Bratislava
48°10′N 17°0′E	Austria	
47°42′N 17°0′E	Hungary	Passing through the center of Nagykanizsa.
46°13′N 17°0′E	Croatia	
45°13′N 17°0′E	Bosnia and Herzegovina	
43°35′N 17°0′E	Croatia	Dalmatia, and the islands of Hvar and Korčula
42°55′N 17°0′E	Mediterranean Sea	Adriatic Sea - passing just east of the island of Lastovo, Croatia
41°5′N 17°0′E	Italy	
40°30′N 17°0′E	Mediterranean Sea	Gulf of Taranto
39°29′N 17°0′E	Italy	
38°56′N 17°0′E	Mediterranean Sea	
31°10′N 17°0′E	Libya	
22°59′N 17°0′E	Chad	
7°38′N 17°0′E	Central African Republic	
3°33′N 17°0′E	Republic of the Congo	
1°8′S 17°0′E	Democratic Republic of the Congo	
7°15′S 17°0′E	Angola	
17°23′S 17°0′E	Namibia	Passing just west of Windhoek
28°4′S 17°0′E	South Africa	Northern Cape
29°34′S 17°0′E	Atlantic Ocean	
60°0′S 17°0′E	Southern Ocean	
69°40′S 17°0′E	Antarctica	Queen Maud Land, claimed by Norway

== See also ==
- 16th meridian east
- 18th meridian east
