= 164 =

164 may refer to:

- 164 (number), the natural number following 163 and preceding 165
- 164 BC
- AD 164
- 164 (New Jersey bus)
- Volvo 164, a mid-size luxury sedan
- UFC 164, a mixed martial arts event held by the Ultimate Fighting Championship
- SANS 164, the South African Bureau of Standards' standard for domestic AC power plugs and sockets
- Alfa Romeo 164, an executive sedan
- 164 Eva, a main-belt asteroid
- Interstate 164, a spur highway of I-64 that was renumbered to I-69
- ONE 164, a Combat sport event produced by ONE Championship
