= List of radio stations in Croatia =

The following is a list of radio stations in Croatia.

== National coverage ==
=== HRT ===
- Hrvatski radio - 1. program
- Hrvatski radio - 2. program
- Hrvatski radio - 3. program

=== Private radio stations ===
- Hrvatski katolički radio
- bravo!
- Otvoreni radio

== Regional coverage ==
=== Regional HRT radio stations ===
- Radio Dubrovnik
- Radio Knin
- Radio Osijek
- Radio Pula
- Radio Rijeka
- Radio Sljeme
- Radio Split
- Radio Zadar

==== Private radio stations ====
- Radio Kaj - Central and Northern Croatia (area of Kajkavian dialect)
- Radio Dalmacija - Dalmatia

== Local coverage in FM ==
County	Name	MHz	Licence Area
Zagreb County	Obiteljski radio Ivanić	99.4	Town of Ivanić Grad
Zagreb County	Zabavni Radio	90.3; 101.8	Wider area of Dugo Selo
Zagreb County	Radio Jaska	93.8	Town of Jastrebarsko
Zagreb County	Radio Samobor	93.0	Town of Samobor
Zagreb County	Radio Sveta Nedelja	97.7	Town of Sveta Nedelja
Zagreb County	Radio Zelina	92.9	Town of Sveti Ivan Zelina
Zagreb County	Gold FM	94.9	Wide area of Velika Gorica
Zagreb County	Radio Vrbovec	94.5	Town of Vrbovec
Zagreb County	Z fm	99.5; 96.0	Wide area of Zaprešić
Zagreb County	City-radio	88.6; 104.9	Town of Velika Gorica, municipality of Lekenik and municipality of Kravarsko
Krapina-Zagorje County	Radio Hrvatsko zagorje - Krapina	91.5; 97.9; 99.2; 102.2; 104.9	Wide area of Krapina
Krapina-Zagorje County	Radio Marija Bistrica	100.4	Municipality of Marija Bistrica
Krapina-Zagorje County	Radio Stubica	95.6; 106.9	Wide area of Donja Stubica
Krapina-Zagorje County	Zagorski radio	87.8; 89.0; 92.8; 101.6; 107.9	Krapina-Zagorje County
Krapina-Zagorje County	Radio Zlatar	97.9	Town of Zlatar
Sisak-Moslavina County	Radio Moslavina	101.4	Wide area of Kutina
Sisak-Moslavina County	Petrinjski radio	106.9	Town of Petrinja
Sisak-Moslavina County	Radio Banovina	96.8; 99.1	Sisak-Moslavina County
Sisak-Moslavina County	Radio Novska	88.3	Town of Novska
Sisak-Moslavina County	Radio Sisak	89.4; 93.1	Town of Sisak
Sisak-Moslavina County	Radio Quirinus	91.7; 97.6; 97.9; 104.9	Sisak-Moslavina County
Karlovac County	Prvi Karlovački	90.1	Wide area of Karlovac
Karlovac County	Trend Radio	102.1; 106.9	Wide area of Karlovac
Karlovac County	Radio Mrežnica	95.4	Wide area of Duga Resa
Karlovac County	Radio Ogulin	96.6	Wide area of Ogulin
Karlovac County	Radio Slunj	95.2	Town of Slunj
Varaždin County	Radio Megaton	104.9	Municipality of Vidovec
Varaždin County	Sjeverni FM	92.8	Town of Ivanec
Varaždin County	Radio Ludbreg	93.4	Town of Ludbreg
Varaždin County	Radio Max	99.3	Municipality of Maruševec
Varaždin County	Radio Novi Marof	97.5	Town of Novi Marof
Varaždin County	Radio Sjeverozapad	95.2	City of Varaždin
Koprivnica-Križevci County	Radio Koprivnica	88.7; 91.7; 95.5; 101.5	Koprivnica-Križevci County
Koprivnica-Križevci County	Radio Drava	92.5	Town of Koprivnica
Koprivnica-Križevci County	Radio Križevci	96.6	Town of Križevci
Koprivnica-Križevci County	Podravski radio	87.6	Town of Đurđevac
Bjelovar-Bilogora County	Alfa radio	100.1	Bjelovar-Bilogora County
Bjelovar-Bilogora County	Super radio	89.0; 105.4	Town of Čazma
Bjelovar-Bilogora County	Krugoval 93.1 MHz	93.1	Town of Garešnica
Bjelovar-Bilogora County	Radio Daruvar	91.5	Town of Daruvar
Bjelovar-Bilogora County	Radio Grubišno Polje	95.1	Town of Grubišno Polje
Bjelovar-Bilogora County	Radio Terezija	93.9; 99.2	City of Bjelovar
Primorje-Gorski Kotar County	Radio Jadranka Mali Lošinj	92.8	Town of Mali Lošinj
Primorje-Gorski Kotar County	Pomorski Radio Bakar	95.8	Part of Bakar
Primorje-Gorski Kotar County	Radio Gorski kotar	89.6; 92.4; 95.0; 107.1	Wide area of Delnice
Primorje-Gorski Kotar County	Radio otok Krk	89.2; 96.0; 96.3	Wide area of Krk
Primorje-Gorski Kotar County	Radio Rab	92.6	Town of Rab
Primorje-Gorski Kotar County	Laganini FM Rijeka	87.6; 91.0; 100.1	Primorje-Gorski Kotar County
Primorje-Gorski Kotar County	Radio Korzo	98.4	City of Rijeka
Primorje-Gorski Kotar County	Radio Marija	88.8	City of Rijeka
Primorje-Gorski Kotar County	Radio Kastav	90.3	City of Rijeka & Kastav
Lika-Senj County	Hrvatski radio Otočac	90.1; 93.0; 107.6	Wide area of Otočac
Lika-Senj County	Radio Senj	90.8; 99.8	Town of Senj
Lika-Senj County	Radio Gospić	93.8; 97.1; 105.7	City of Gospić and Multipality of Perušić
Virovitica-Podravina County	Županijski Radio Virovitica	91.8; 92.9; 93.7; 96.3	Virovitica-Podravina County
Virovitica-Podravina County	Radio Orahovica	95.7	Town of Orahovica
Virovitica-Podravina County	Pitomi Radio	93.5	Municipalities of Pitomača, Špišić Bukovica, Kloštar Podravski and Podravske Sesvete
Virovitica-Podravina County	The Room FM	97.0	Town of Virovitica
Virovitica-Podravina County	Radio Slatina	107.4	Town of Slatina
Virovitica-Podravina County	Radio Maria, Virovitica	88.3	Wide area of Virovitica
Požega-Slavonia County	Laganini FM Požega	92.4; 99.0	Požega-Slavonia County
Požega-Slavonia County	Radio Vallis Aurea	90.2; 96.7	Wide area of Požega
Brod-Posavina County	Radio Slavonija	88.6; 89.1; 94.3	Brod-Posavina County
Brod-Posavina County	Laganini FM Brod	101.3	Town of Slavonski Brod
Brod-Posavina County	Radio 92 FM	92.0	Town of Slavonski Brod
Brod-Posavina County	Radio Nova Gradiška	98.1	Town of Nova Gradiška
Brod-Posavina County	Radio Prkos	91.0	Town of Nova Gradiška
Brod-Posavina County	Radio Bljesak	105.5	Municipality of Okučani
Zadar County	Antena Zadar	97.2	City of Zadar
Zadar County	Radio Biograd na Moru	94.0	Wide area of Biograd na Moru
Zadar County	Novi Radio	89.3; 102.6; 103.8	Zadar County
Zadar County	Radio Benkovac	93.0	Wide area of Benkovac
Zadar County	Radio 057	91.0	City of Zadar
Zadar County	Radio Pag	94.8	Island of Pag
Osijek-Baranja County	Slavonski Radio	89.7; 91.0; 100.6; 106.2	Osijek-Baranja County
Osijek-Baranja County	Laganini FM Osijek	99.1	City of Osijek
Osijek-Baranja County	Studentski radio UNIOS	107.8	City of Osijek
Osijek-Baranja County	Hrvatski Radio Valpovština	89.0	Town of Valpovo
Osijek-Baranja County	Novi Radio	99.5	Town of Đakovo
Osijek-Baranja County	Radio Banska Kosa	96.9	Town of Beli Manastir
Osijek-Baranja County	Radio Baranja	88.0	Town of Beli Manastir
Osijek-Baranja County	Radio Donji Miholjac	92.3	Town of Donji Miholjac
Osijek-Baranja County	Radio Našice	88.7	Town of Našice
Osijek-Baranja County	Radio Đakovo	87.6; 100.2	Wide area of Đakovo
Osijek-Baranja County	Gradski radio Belišće - Naš radio	101.3	Town of Belišće
Šibenik-Knin County	Radio Drniš	89.0	Town of Drniš
Šibenik-Knin County	Radio Ritam	106.4	City of Šibenik
Šibenik-Knin County	Radio Šibenik	88.6; 100.7; 104.9	Šibenik-Knin County
Vukovar-Srijem County	Radio Dunav	101.5	City of Vukovar
Vukovar-Srijem County	Hrvatski radio Vukovar	95.4; 104.1; 107.2	Vukovar-Srijem County
Vukovar-Srijem County	Radio Županja	97.5	Wide area of Županja
Vukovar-Srijem County	Radio Ilok	101.3	Town of Ilok
Vukovar-Srijem County	Radio Vinkovci	90.2	Town of Vinkovci
Vukovar-Srijem County	Radio Borovo	100.7	Municipality of Borovo
Split-Dalmatia County	Radio Imotski	107.4	Town of Imotski
Split-Dalmatia County	Hit Radio	104.9	Wide area of Sinj
Split-Dalmatia County	Radio Nautic	90.5	Island of Vis
Split-Dalmatia County	Megamix Radio Hvar	94.7; 95.4	Wide area of Hvar
Split-Dalmatia County	Ultra FM Split	93.6; 96.8; 99.3	Split-Dalmatia County
Split-Dalmatia County	Radio Biokovo	105.0	Town of Vrgorac
Split-Dalmatia County	Radio Makarska Rivijera	97.6; 98.4	Town of Makarska
Split-Dalmatia County	Radio Brač	91.8; 102.7; 106.0	Island of Brač
Split-Dalmatia County	Gradski radio Trogir	95.6	Town of Trogir
Split-Dalmatia County	Radio Sunce	92.9	Wide area of Split
Split-Dalmatia County	Radio Maria, Split	97.2	City of Split
Istria County	Radio Istra	88.0; 88.7; 92.1; 96.9; 97.9; 98.0; 98.5; 107.3	Istria County
Istria County	Radio Maestral	95.4	City of Pula
Istria County	Radio Centar Studio Poreč	89.6; 93.6	Town of Poreč
Istria County	Radio Labin	91.0; 93.2; 95.0; 99.7	Town of Labin
Istria County	Radio Eurostar	101.7	Town of Buje
Istria County	Rovinj FM	88.5; 90.7; 94.8	City of Rovinj
Istria County	Medulin FM	95.0	City of Pula & Municipality of Medulin
Istria County	Radio Rojc	87.7	City of Pula
Istria County	Radio Učka	?	?
Dubrovnik-Neretva County	Radio Blato	92.0	Municipality of Blato
Dubrovnik-Neretva County	Radio Delta	97.0	Town of Metković
Dubrovnik-Neretva County	Radio Korčula	107.5	Town of Korčula
Dubrovnik-Neretva County	Radio-M	90.1	Municipality of Vela Luka
Dubrovnik-Neretva County	Radio Ploče	94.5	Town of Ploče
Dubrovnik-Neretva County	Soundset Ragusa	93.4; 96.3; 99.6; 107.0	Dubrovnik-Neretva County
Dubrovnik-Neretva County	Unidu radio	97.5	Part of Dubrovnik
Dubrovnik-Neretva County	Radio Val	96.5	Municipality of Vela Luka
Međimurje County	Hrvatski radio Čakovec	98.0	Međimurje County
Međimurje County	Radio 105	104.0	Wide area of Mursko Središće
Međimurje County	Radio 1	105.6	Wide area of Čakovec
Međimurje County	Studio M	98.8	Town of Prelog
Zagreb	Antena Zagreb	89.7	Zagreb County
Zagreb	Top Radio	101.0	Zagreb County & City of Zagreb
Zagreb	Extra FM	93.6; 104.5	City of Zagreb
Zagreb	Radio Student	100.5	Part of Zagreb
Zagreb	Laganini FM	89.1; 98.0	City of Zagreb
Zagreb	Enter Zagreb	97.0; 99.0	Eastern part of Zagreb
Zagreb	Radio Maria, Zagreb	96.4; 106.8	City of Zagreb
Zagreb	Yammat FM	102.5	City of Zagreb

== Former radio stations ==
- Totalni FM Zagreb
- Totalni FM Split
- Totalni FM Rijeka
- Totalni FM Osijek
- Totalni FM Sisak
- Totalni FM Varaždin
- Radio Velika Gorica
- Jadranski Radio
- Obiteljski Radio
- Nautic Radio Kaštel
- RTL Radio
- Soundset Trsat
- Soundset Brod
- Radio Marin
- Laganini FM Pula
- Laganini FM Varaždin
- Gradski Radio Osijek
- Radio Riva
- Radio Varaždin
- Soundset Kult
- Soundset Požega
- Hrvatski Radio Karlovac
- Radio BBR
- Otoćni Radio Kornati
- Radio Cibona - Sportski Radio
- Hit FM
- Prvi Radio
- Soundset Plavi Radio
- Hrvatski Radio Županja
- Županjiski Radio Gospić
- Radio Karlovac
- Radio Čakovec
- Radio GoGo Goričan
- Radio SVID
- Radio Zona Buzet
- Županjiski Radio Šibenik
- Radiopostaja Vinkovci
- Soundset Giardini
- Radio Zabok
- Radio Beli Manastir
- Radio 101
- narodni radio

== DAB+ and Internet Radio ==
Today more radio channels are broadcast on OIV Croatia DAB+ and the Internet.

- RADIO KAJ
- Otvoreni radio
- mojRADIO
- Yammat FM
- ANTENA
- CMC Radio
- Narodni
- DALMATIA
- HRT-HR1
- HRT-HR2
- HRT-HR3
- Trogir
- HRT - Glas Hrvatske

Sjeverni FM
