= 16th meridian west =

Line of longitude

16th meridian west

The meridian 16° west of Greenwich is a line of longitude that extends from the North Pole across the Arctic Ocean, Greenland, Iceland, the Atlantic Ocean, Africa, the Southern Ocean, and Antarctica to the South Pole.

The 16th meridian west forms a great circle with the 164th meridian east.

== From Pole to Pole ==
Starting at the North Pole and heading south to the South Pole, the 16th meridian west passes through:

Co-ordinates	Country, territory or sea	Notes
90°0′N 16°0′W	Arctic Ocean	
81°45′N 16°0′W	Greenland	
80°21′N 16°0′W	Atlantic Ocean	Greenland Sea
66°31′N 16°0′W	Iceland	
64°7′N 16°0′W	Atlantic Ocean	Passing just east of Porto Santo Island, Portugal (at 33°5′N 16°17′W); Passing just west of Selvagem Grande Island, Portugal (at 30°8′N 15°52′W); Passing just east of Selvagem Pequena Island, Portugal (at 30°2′N 16°2′W); Passing just east of the islands of Tenerife, Spain (at 28°33′N 16°7′W); Passing just west of the island of Gran Canaria, Spain (at 27°55′N 15°49′W)
23°39′N 16°0′W	Western Sahara	Dakhla peninsula — claimed by Morocco
23°38′N 16°0′W	Atlantic Ocean	
23°22′N 16°0′W	Western Sahara	Claimed by Morocco
21°20′N 16°0′W	Mauritania	Passing through Nouakchott (at 18°6′N 16°0′W)
16°30′N 16°0′W	Senegal	
13°35′N 16°0′W	Gambia	
13°10′N 16°0′W	Senegal	
12°27′N 16°0′W	Guinea-Bissau	Mainland and Ilha de Pecixe
11°48′N 16°0′W	Atlantic Ocean	
11°34′N 16°0′W	Guinea-Bissau	Bissagos Islands
11°2′N 16°0′W	Atlantic Ocean	
60°0′S 16°0′W	Southern Ocean	
72°18′S 16°0′W	Antarctica	Queen Maud Land, claimed by Norway

== See also ==
- 15th meridian west
- 17th meridian west
