= 15th meridian east =

Line of longitude

The meridian 15° east of Greenwich is a line of longitude that extends from the North Pole across the Arctic Ocean, Europe, Africa, the Atlantic Ocean, the Southern Ocean, and Antarctica to the South Pole.

15th meridian east (interactive map)

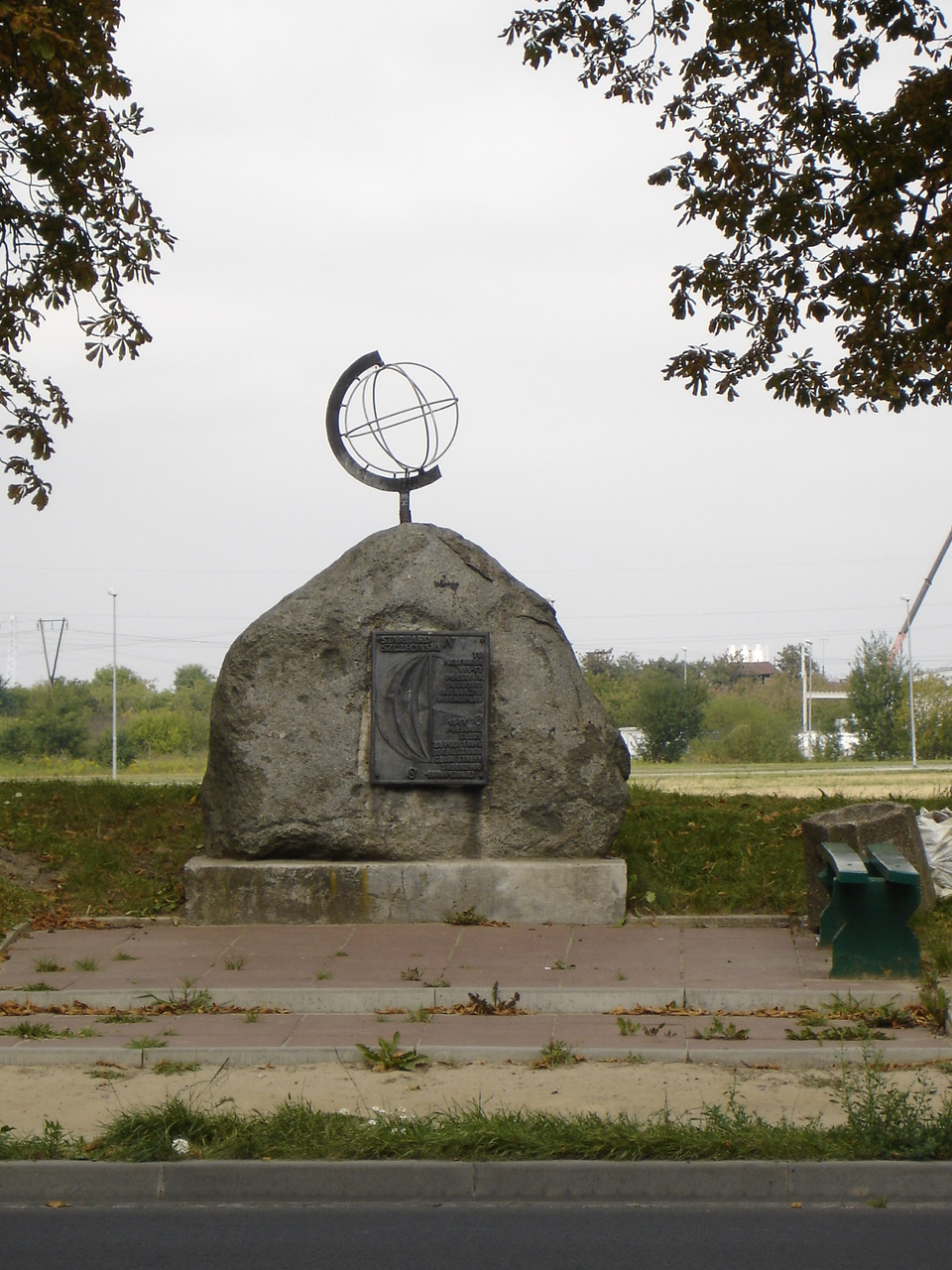
Monument marking the meridian in Stargard, Poland

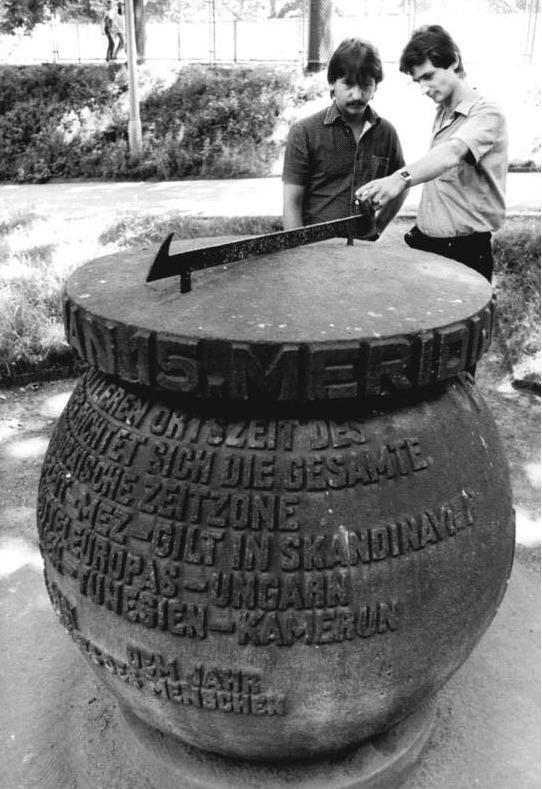
Monument marking the meridian in Görlitz, most eastern town of Germany

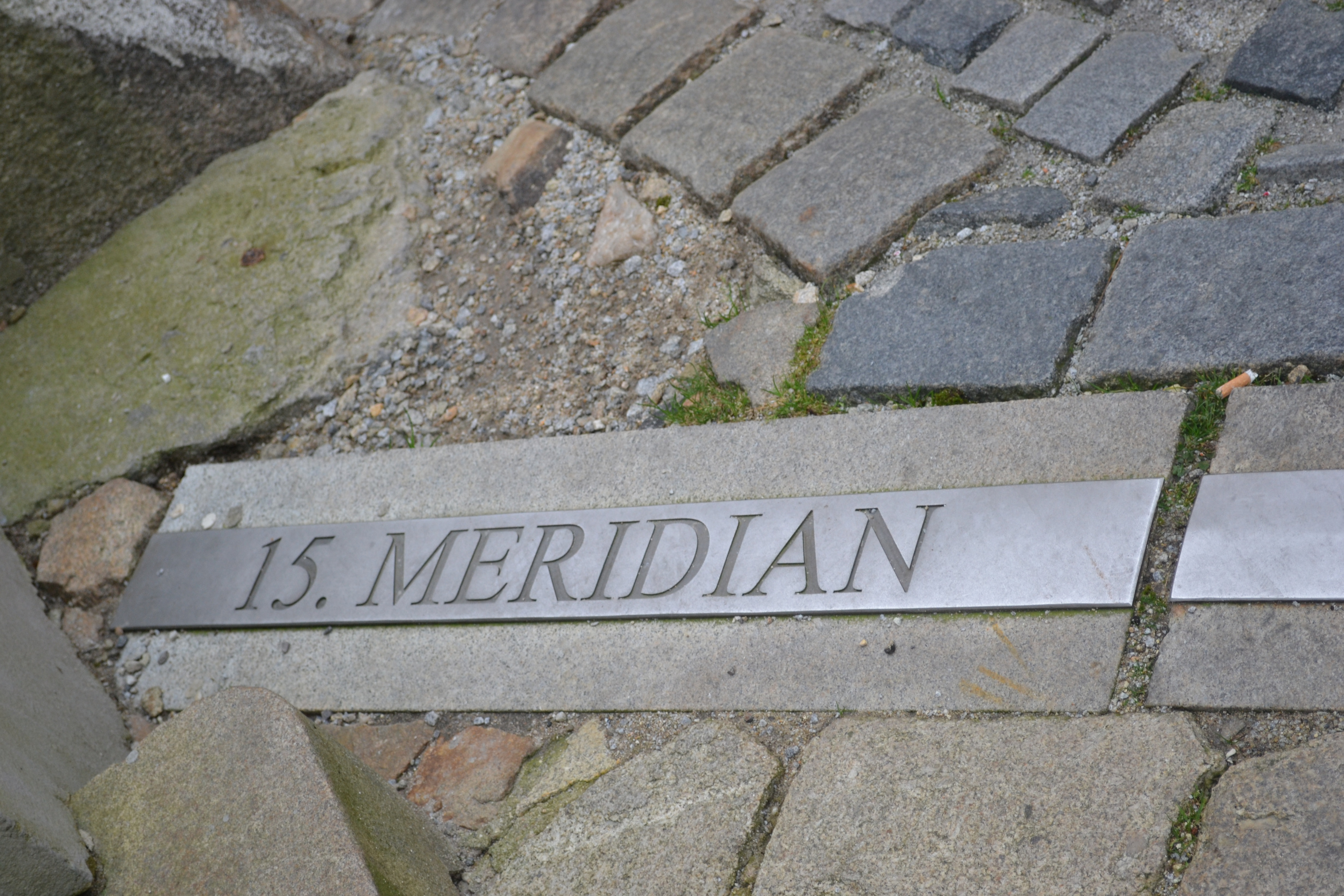
Mark of the 15th meridian in the pavement in Jindřichův Hradec, Czech Republic

The 15th meridian east forms a great circle with the 165th meridian west.

The meridian is the central axis of time zones with the UTC+01:00 offset, including Central European Time and West Africa Time.

== From Pole to Pole ==
Starting at the North Pole and heading south to the South Pole, the 15th meridian east passes through:

Co-ordinates	Country, territory or sea	Notes
90°0′N 15°0′E	Arctic Ocean	
79°42′N 15°0′E	Norway	Island of Spitsbergen, Svalbard
79°8′N 15°0′E	Atlantic Ocean	Greenland Sea; Norwegian Sea
68°51′N 15°0′E	Norway	Islands of Langøya, Austvågøy and Hinnøya
68°16′N 15°0′E	Vestfjorden	
67°59′N 15°0′E	Norway	Island of Engeløya and the mainland
66°9′N 15°0′E	Sweden	for about 1111 km
56°9′N 15°0′E	Baltic Sea	
55°11′N 15°0′E	Denmark	Island of Bornholm, for about 21 km. There is a small memorial at 55°N 15°E
55°0′N 15°0′E	Baltic Sea	
54°5′N 15°0′E	Poland	
51°19.2′N 15°0′E	Germany	For about 17 km between Rothenburg and Görlitz.
51°9.9′N 15°0′E	Poland	For 1500 m in Zgorzelec.
51°9.1′N 15°0′E	Germany	For 300 m in Görlitz.
51°8.9′N 15°0′E	Poland	
51°0.65′N 15°0′E	Czech Republic	For about 3 km
50°59′N 15°0′E	Poland	For about 6 km
50°56′N 15°0′E	Czech Republic	A mark in the pavement is found in Jindřichův Hradec, but the precise place is 100m to the West.
49°0.8′N 15°0′E	Austria	
49°0.25′N 15°0′E	Czech Republic	
49°0.038′N 15°0′E	Austria	
46°37′N 15°0′E	Slovenia	Almost corresponds to the middle line of the country in the direction west-east. A memorial has been set up in the village of Vrhtrebnje.
45°30′N 15°0′E	Croatia	Mainland, and the islands of Pag, Sestrunj and Dugi otok
44°2′N 15°0′E	Mediterranean Sea	Adriatic Sea
42°0′N 15°0′E	Italy	On the beach of Termoli; a 7-metre monument marks the 42°N 15°E point
40°12′N 15°0′E	Mediterranean Sea	Tyrrhenian Sea
38°23′N 15°0′E	Italy	Island of Vulcano
38°22′N 15°0′E	Mediterranean Sea	Tyrrhenian Sea
38°9′N 15°0′E	Italy	Island of Sicily, across the Etna volcano
36°42′N 15°0′E	Mediterranean Sea	
32°25′N 15°0′E	Libya	
23°0′N 15°0′E	Chad	For about 1 km - the meridian just passes through the country's most north-westerly point
22°59′N 15°0′E	Niger	
16°22′N 15°0′E	Chad	Passing through Lake Chad; Passing just west of N'Djamena
12°7′N 15°0′E	Cameroon	
10°0′N 15°0′E	Chad	
8°41′N 15°0′E	Cameroon	
6°45′N 15°0′E	Central African Republic	
4°25′N 15°0′E	Cameroon	
2°1′N 15°0′E	Republic of the Congo	
4°35′S 15°0′E	Democratic Republic of the Congo	
5°52′S 15°0′E	Angola	
17°23′S 15°0′E	Namibia	
23°21′S 15°0′E	Atlantic Ocean	
60°0′S 15°0′E	Southern Ocean	
69°15′S 15°0′E	Antarctica	Queen Maud Land, claimed by Norway

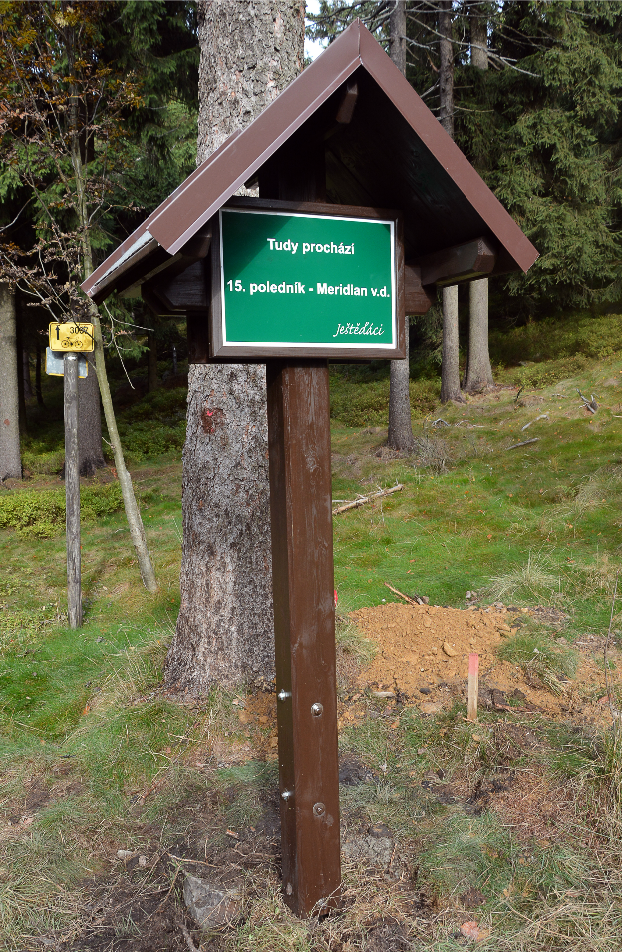
Wooden mark of the 15th meridian east passing through the Ještěd-Kozákov Ridge. Made by local group called Ještěďáci.

== See also ==
- 14th meridian east
- 16th meridian east
