= 164th Radio Technical Brigade =

- 164-та радіотехнічна бригада
- Active: 1 June 1988 – present
- Country: Ukraine; Soviet Union (1988–1991)
- Allegiance: Armed Forces of Ukraine
- Branch: Ukrainian Air Force
- Type: Brigade
- Role: Radio Technical Troops
- Part of: Air Command East
- Garrison/HQ: Kharkiv
- Nickname: Slobidska
- Motto: Videmus non condonamus
- Equipment: Various including the P18-"Malachite"
- Engagements: Russo-Ukrainian war: War in Donbas; Russian invasion of Ukraine
- Decorations: For Courage and Bravery

Commanders
- Current commander: Colonel Ptashchenko V.V.

Insignia
- Former Insignia

The 164th Radio Technical Brigade "Slobidska" is a Brigade of the Ukrainian Air Force concerned with radar operations in Kharkiv Sumy, Poltava, Dnipropetrovsk, Donetsk, Luhansk and Zaporizhzhia Oblast, an area of about 200 thousand square kilometers and a population of eighteen million. It is subordinated to the Air Command East. It is headquartered in Kharkiv.

== History ==
In 1944 the 44th Separate VNOS Battalion served successively under the Kharkiv Divisional Air Defence District, the Kharkiv Corps Air Defence District, and the 6th Air Defence Corps. During the closing months of the war it served under the 87th Air Defence Division and the 11th and 10th Air Defence Corps. In April and May 1945 the latter was assigned to protect the 1st Ukrainian Front.

The 79th Radio-Technical Regiment was formed at Kharkiv on August 13, 1957 from the 44th Independent VNOS Battalion. On May 23, 1988 it was combined with the 50th Radio-Technical Regiment and redesignated the 164th Radio-Technical Brigade.

In 1992, following the dissolution of the Soviet Union, the 164th Radio Technical Brigade of the Soviet Army swore allegiance to Ukraine becoming a part of its armed forces. On 21 February 2008, the brigade received the Combat Flag.

In 2012, 15 radar units of the brigade and about 500 servicemen of the brigade ensured the security of Euro 2012 by providing radar coverage for air defense purposes.

On 22 March 2012, a unit of the brigade was attacked by armed attackers killing a soldier of the brigade (Berezyuk Volodymyr Volodymyrovych), the brigade's personnel launched a counterattack against the attackers killing one and capturing another who was later sentenced to life in prison.

The brigade, as tasked with radar coverage for Eastern Ukraine and thus was most affected by the War in Donbas as the separatist and Russian forces were operating in the areas under the coverage of the Brigade. On 6 May 2014, the 35D6 radar detection radar of the brigade was attacked by separatists, the weapons of the personnel were confiscated and then the radar was burned by separatists near Sverdlovsk, Ukraine. On 4 June 2014, around three hundred separatists attacked the 2215th Radio Battalion "Luhansk", a part of the 164th Brigade and an engagement took place in which three vehicles of the battalion were destroyed as a warehouse of the battalion caught fire prompting the battalion to surrender, all its equipment was captured but all servicemen remained safe. On 16 June 2014, the 2215th battalion's positions (Note: captured by the separatists) were heavily shelled by Ukrainian Forces "almost" destroying the entire equipment of the battalion. On 21 June 2014, the 755th Separate Radar Company (Avdiivka) (Note: subordinated to 2215th battalion but a separate formation) was attacked by separatists who demanded its surrender but it refused so they attacked it using large caliber weapons and mortars destroying all its equipment. On 2 July 2014, the positions of the 771st Separate Radar Company (Note: subordinated to 2215th battalion but a separate formation) were attacked by separatists using four mortars but the attack failed to cause any significant damage or casualties. In September 2014, the brigade received modernized P-18 radar systems to boost detection capabilities for UAVs.

On 24 Match 2015, the 771st Separate Radar Company (Note: subordinated to 2215th battalion but a separate formation) was again attacked by a separatist sabotage and reconnaissance unit but again failed to cause any significant damage or casualties.

The brigade's personnel defended the Butivka-Donetska mine near Spartak from September 2016 and on 3 April 2017 a soldier of the brigade (Artur Viktorovych Latchenko) was killed near the mine as a result of separatist shelling.

On 17 March 2019, the brigade's personnel were serving in Vodiane when they were attacker by separatists using a variety of weapons followed by a separatist offensive towards theirs positions, however the Ukrainians held their ground and forced the separatists to retreat. In order to provide cover to the retreating separatists, other separatists started shelling with mortars killing a soldier of the brigade (Viktor Vasyliovych Grabar) and wounding three.

On 23 August 2021, the brigade was given the honorary name of Slobidska.

=== Russian Invasion of Ukraine ===
The brigade participated and saw combat during the Russian invasion of Ukraine. The radio engineering brigade were among the first Ukrainian radio-technical positions struck by Russian multiple-launch rocket systems, on February 24, 2022. The brigade, with other radio-technical units withdrew from targeted positions according to plan and maintained their ability to detect Russian aircraft.

On 1 March 2022, a female soldier of the Brigade (Yana Olehivna Makarovych) was killed due to wounds she received during the Russian airstrikes on the brigade's positions on 24 February 2022.

On 6 December 2023, the brigade was awarded the honorary award For Courage and Bravery by the President of Ukraine Volodymyr Zelenskyy.

On 18 August 2024, a soldier of the brigade (Shelengivsky Maksym Gennadiyovych) was killed in combat whilst serving on the frontlines.

== Structure ==
The structure of the brigade is as follows:

- 164th Radio Technical Brigade
  - 2315th Radio Engineering Battalion (Rohan)
    - 766th Separate Radar Company (Poltava)
    - 769th Separate Radar Company (Lozova)
    - 770th Separate Radar Company (Borova)
    - 764th Separate Radar Company (Okhtyrka)
  - ~~2215th Radio Engineering Battalion (Luhansk)~~
    - ~~755th Separate Radar Company (Avdiivka)~~
    - 771st Separate Radar Company (Milove)
  - 2323rd Radio Engineering Battalion (Mariupol)
    - 761st Separate Radar Company (Berdyansk)
  - 2316th Radio Engineering Battalion (Zaporizhzhia)
    - 757th Separate Radar Company (Ingulets)
    - 756th Separate Radar Company (Melitopol)
    - 17th Separate Radar Company (Dnipro)

== Commanders ==
- Colonel Andreev M.K. (1990–1996)
- Colonel Rafalsky Y.I. (1996–1999)
- Colonel Bakumenko B.V. (1999–2005)
- Colonel Petruchyk V.I. (2005–2007)
- Colonel Kovalevsky S.M. (2007–2011)
- Colonel Hrynchak R.M. (2011–2013)
- Colonel Yevtushenko O.V. (2013–2018)
- Colonel Ptashchenko V.V. (2018-)

== Sources ==
- Радіотехнічна бригада відпрацювала дії під час Євро-2012
- На Харківщині пройшла чергова ротація військовослужбовців до району проведення АТО
