= Time in Samoa =

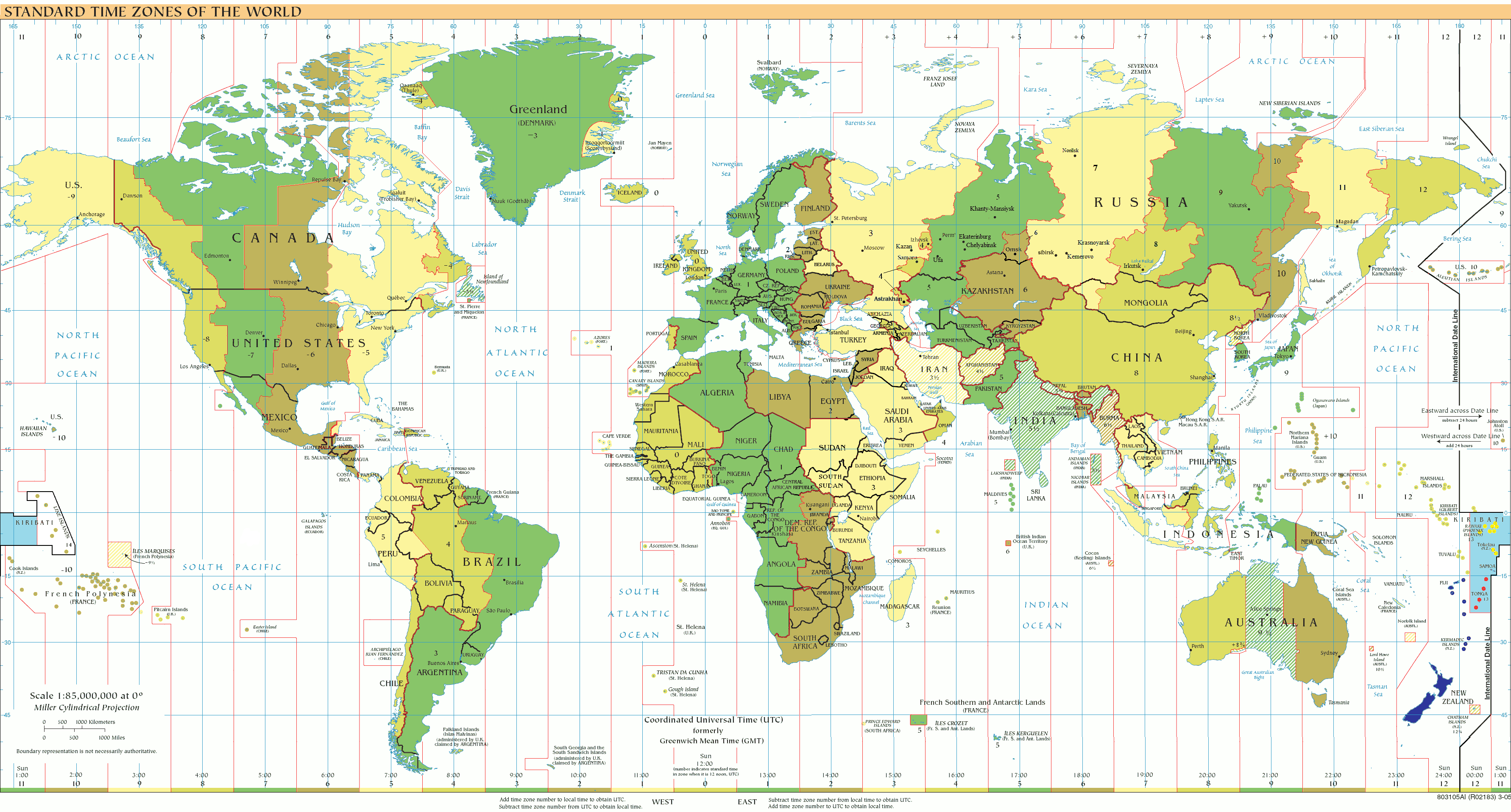
World map showing Samoa in UTC+13

Samoa uses UTC+13:00 as standard time. Until the end of 2011, it used UTC−11:00 as standard time. Samoa observed daylight saving time from 2010 to 2021.

As it is located just west of the International Date Line, Samoa is among the first places on Earth to see each new day, along with Tonga, Tokelau, and parts of Kiribati.

== Daylight saving time ==
Because it is located near the equator, Samoa traditionally did not observe daylight saving time. The introduction of daylight saving time was initially planned for 2009 but was postponed for one year in the aftermath of the 2009 Samoa tsunami. From 2010 to 2021, Samoa observed daylight saving time during summer in the Southern Hemisphere. From 2012 to 2021, the schedule was synchronised with neighbouring New Zealand, from the last Sunday in September at 03:00 UTC+13:00 (changing to 04:00 UTC+14:00) to the first Sunday in April at 04:00 UTC+14:00 (changing to 03:00 UTC+13:00).

== 2011 time zone change ==
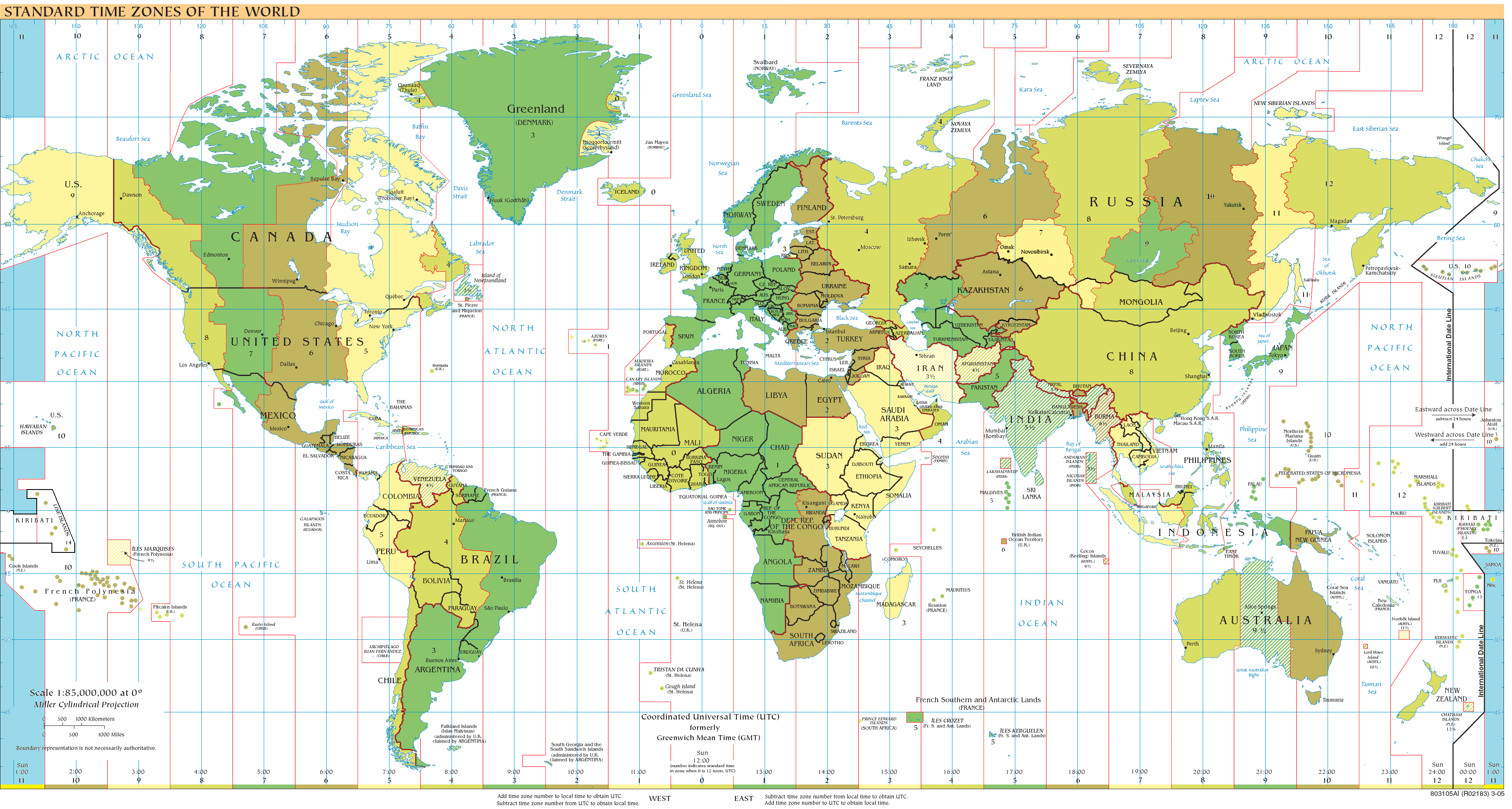
World map of UTC-11, the time offset of the standard time until the end of 2011.

Until the end of 2011, Samoa lay east of the International Date Line, observing UTC−11:00 (UTC−10:00 during daylight saving time). This was in line with neighbouring American Samoa, which continues to observe UTC−11:00 (Samoa Time Zone) all year. At the end of Thursday, 29 December 2011, Samoa continued directly to Saturday, 31 December 2011, skipping the entire calendar day of Friday, 30 December 2011 and effectively redrawing the International Date Line. Prime minister Tuilaepa Sailele Malielegaoi stated that the change was intended to improve business with New Zealand, Australia, China, and other places in Asia.

== IANA time zone database ==
The IANA time zone database in the file zone.tab contains one zone for Samoa, named "Pacific/Apia".
