= 164th Division (2nd formation) (People's Republic of China) =

164th Division (1950–52)
- Active: 1950.10 - 1952.1
- Country: People's Republic of China
- Branch: People's Liberation Army
- Type: Division
- Role: Infantry
- Part of: Northeastern Military Region

The 164th Division (Chinese: 第164师)(2nd Formation) was established in October 1950, based on the Security Division of the Northeastern Military Region.

In July 1950, the 502nd Infantry Regiment of the inactivating 168th Division was attached to the 164th division.

In January 1952, the division was disbanded. Its divisional headquarters was absorbed into the 3rd Armored Troops Tank Organization Base, while its regiments were renamed the 3rd, 5th and 6th Independent Infantry Regiments of Northeastern Military Districts, respectively.
