= 165th meridian east =

Line of longitude

165th meridian east

The meridian 165° east of Greenwich is a line of longitude that extends from the North Pole across the Arctic Ocean, Asia, the Pacific Ocean, the Southern Ocean, and Antarctica to the South Pole.

The 165th meridian east forms a great ellipse with the 15th meridian west.

== From Pole to Pole ==
Starting at the North Pole and heading south to the South Pole, the 165th meridian east passes through:

Co-ordinates	Country, territory or sea	Notes
90°0′N 165°0′E	Arctic Ocean	
75°8′N 165°0′E	East Siberian Sea	
69°34′N 165°0′E	Russia	Chukotka Autonomous Okrug; Kamchatka Krai — from 64°41′N 165°0′E
59°50′N 165°0′E	Bering Sea	Passing just east of Karaginsky Island, Kamchatka Krai, Russia (at 59°2′N 164°44′E)
55°35′N 165°0′E	Pacific Ocean	Passing just west of Bikini Atoll, Marshall Islands (at 11°35′N 165°12′E)
10°15′S 165°0′E	Coral Sea	
20°42′S 165°0′E	New Caledonia	
21°22′S 165°0′E	Coral Sea	
24°56′S 165°0′E	Pacific Ocean	
60°0′S 165°0′E	Southern Ocean	Passing just east of Sturge Island, Balleny Islands, claimed by New Zealand (at 67°33′S 164°49′E)
70°36′S 165°0′E	Antarctica	Ross Dependency, claimed by New Zealand
74°34′S 165°0′E	Southern Ocean	Ross Sea
77°54′S 165°0′E	Antarctica	Ross Dependency, claimed by New Zealand

== See also ==
- 164th meridian east
- 166th meridian east
