= 15th meridian west =

Line of longitude

15th meridian west

The meridian 15° west of Greenwich is a line of longitude that extends from the North Pole across the Arctic Ocean, Greenland, Iceland, the Atlantic Ocean, Africa, the Southern Ocean, and Antarctica to the South Pole.

The 15th meridian west forms a great circle with the 165th meridian east.

== From Pole to Pole ==
Starting at the North Pole and heading south to the South Pole, the 15th meridian west passes through:

Co-ordinates	Country, territory or sea	Notes
90°0′N 15°0′W	Arctic Ocean	
81°55′N 15°0′W	Greenland	Flade Isblink
80°44′N 15°0′W	Atlantic Ocean	Greenland Sea
66°21′N 15°0′W	Iceland	
64°14′N 15°0′W	Atlantic Ocean	
24°35′N 15°0′W	Western Sahara	Claimed by Morocco
21°20′N 15°0′W	Mauritania	
16°41′N 15°0′W	Senegal	
13°48′N 15°0′W	Gambia	
13°29′N 15°0′W	Senegal	
12°41′N 15°0′W	Guinea-Bissau	
10°57′N 15°0′W	Guinea	Katchek Island
10°46′N 15°0′W	Atlantic Ocean	
60°0′S 15°0′W	Southern Ocean	
72°4′S 15°0′W	Antarctica	Queen Maud Land, claimed by Norway

== See also ==
- 14th meridian west
- 16th meridian west
