= 164th meridian west =

Line of longitude

164th meridian west

The meridian 164° west of Greenwich is a line of longitude that extends from the North Pole across the Arctic Ocean, North America, the Pacific Ocean, the Southern Ocean, and Antarctica to the South Pole.

The 164th meridian west forms a great ellipse with the 16th meridian east.

== From Pole to Pole ==
Starting at the North Pole and heading south to the South Pole, the 164th meridian west passes through:

Co-ordinates	Country, territory or sea	Notes
90°0′N 164°0′W	Arctic Ocean	
71°44′N 164°0′W	Chukchi Sea	
68°59′N 164°0′W	United States	Alaska
67°32′N 164°0′W	Chukchi Sea	Kotzebue Sound
66°36′N 164°0′W	United States	Alaska — Seward Peninsula
64°33′N 164°0′W	Bering Sea	Norton Sound
63°15′N 164°0′W	United States	Alaska — Yukon–Kuskokwim Delta
59°49′N 164°0′W	Bering Sea	
54°59′N 164°0′W	United States	Alaska — Unimak Island
54°37′N 164°0′W	Pacific Ocean	
60°0′S 164°0′W	Southern Ocean	
78°15′S 164°0′W	Antarctica	Ross Dependency, claimed by New Zealand

== See also ==
- 163rd meridian west
- 165th meridian west
