= Karaginsky Island =

Island in the Bering Sea

Karaginsky
Native name: Карагинский остров
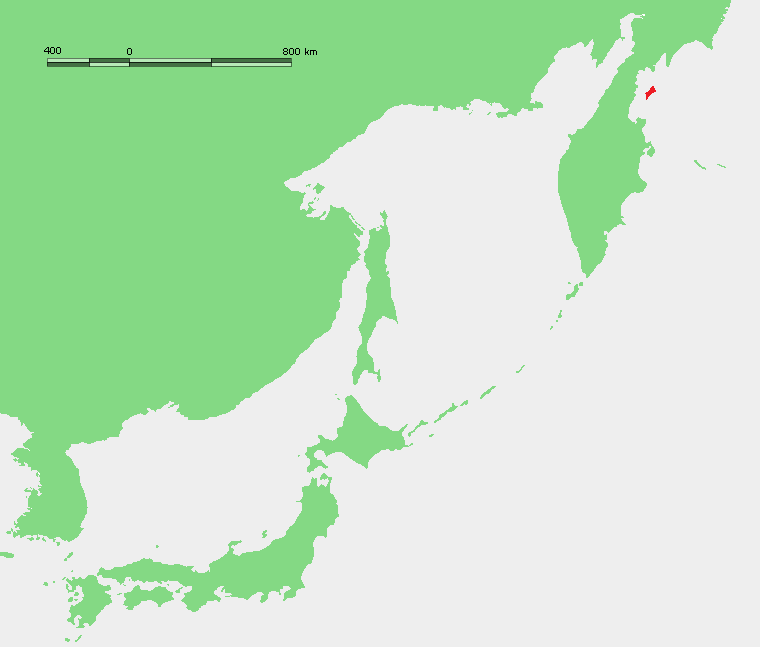
- Location of Karaginsky Island off the eastern Kamchatka coast

- Location within Russia

Geography
- Location: Karaginsky Gulf of the Bering Sea
- Coordinates: 58°46′N 163°52′E
- Area: 2,404 km^{2} (928 sq mi)
- Length: 101 km (62.8 mi)
- Width: 27 km (16.8 mi)
- Highest elevation: 912 m (2992 ft)
- Highest point: Gora Sakonoval

Administration
- Russia
- Krai: Kamchatka Krai

Demographics
- Population: uninhabited

Ramsar Wetland
- Official name: Karaginski Island, Bering Sea
- Designated: 13 September 1994
- Reference no.: 694

Karaginsky Island or Karaginskiy Island (Russian: Карагинский остров) is an island in the Karaginsky Gulf of the Bering Sea. The 40-kilometre (25 mi)-wide strait between the Kamchatka Peninsula and this island is called Litke Strait. Karaginsky Island is a Ramsar site. Even though the island is uninhabited, the Karagin Koryaks have traditionally lived in Karaginskiy Island. Migrant reindeer herders still live in temporary shelters on the island.

The island is 101 km (63 mi) long and up to 27 km (17 mi) wide, with an area of 193,597 ha (1,935.97 km^{2}; 747.48 mi^{2}). The highest peak of the island is 912 m (2,992 ft). Karaginsky Island is covered with tundra vegetation and cedar underwood. In the summer, there are many flowers.

Verkhoturov Island (Ostrov Verkhoturova), a small and narrow island, lies 45 km (28 mi) north of Karaginsky Island's northern tip. It is 3.5 km (2.2 mi) long and has an average width of 0.5 km (0.31 mi).

== Administration ==
Administratively, Karaginskiy Island belongs to the Kamchatka Krai of the Russian Federation.
