= 163rd meridian west =

Line of longitude

163rd meridian west

The meridian 163° west of Greenwich is a line of longitude that extends from the North Pole across the Arctic Ocean, North America, the Pacific Ocean, the Southern Ocean, and Antarctica to the South Pole.

The 163rd meridian west forms a great circle with the 17th meridian east.

== From Pole to Pole ==
Starting at the North Pole and heading south to the South Pole, the 163rd meridian west passes through:

Co-ordinates	Country, territory or sea	Notes
90°0′N 163°0′W	Arctic Ocean	
71°42′N 163°0′W	Chukchi Sea	
69°46′N 163°0′W	United States	Alaska
67°2′N 163°0′W	Chukchi Sea	Kotzebue Sound
66°5′N 163°0′W	United States	Alaska — Seward Peninsula
64°33′N 163°0′W	Bering Sea	Norton Sound
63°5′N 163°0′W	United States	Alaska
59°53′N 163°0′W	Bering Sea	Passing just east of Amak Island, Alaska, United States (at 55°25′N 163°7′W)
55°14′N 163°0′W	United States	Alaska — Alaska Peninsula
55°4′N 163°0′W	Pacific Ocean	Passing just east of Unimak Island, Alaska, United States (at 54°40′N 163°3′W); Passing just west of Sanak Island, Alaska, United States (at 54°27′N 162°50′W); Passing just east of Suwarrow atoll, Cook Islands (at 13°26′S 163°2′W); Passing just east of Palmerston Island, Cook Islands (at 18°4′S 163°9′W)
60°0′S 163°0′W	Southern Ocean	
78°12′S 163°0′W	Antarctica	Ross Dependency, claimed by New Zealand

== See also ==
- 162nd meridian west
- 164th meridian west
