= 2nd Marine Brigade (People's Republic of China) =

145th Division (1948–52) 219th Infantry Division (1952–60) 219th Army Division (1960–70) 164th Army Division (1970–1985) 164th Infantry Division (1985–98) 164th Marine Brigade (1998–2017) 2nd Marine Brigade(2017-)
- Active: 1948.11 –
- Country: People's Republic of China
- Branch: People's Liberation Army, People's Liberation Army Marine Corps
- Type: Brigade
- Role: Marine Infantry
- Part of: South Sea Fleet
- Garrison/HQ: Zhanjiang, Guangdong
- Engagements: Chinese Civil War, Sino-Vietnamese War

The 145th Division (Chinese: 第145师) was created in November 1948 under the Regulation of the Redesignations of All Organizations and Units of the Army, issued by Central Military Commission on November 1, 1948, basing on the 34th Division, 12th Column of the PLA Northeastern Field Army. Its history can be traced to Eastern Harbin Security Command, formed in September 1945.

The division is part of 49th Corps. Under the flag of 145th division it took part in several major battles during the Chinese Civil War. The division was composed of 433rd, 434th and 435th Regiments.

In April 1952 the division absorbed the disbanding 219th Division (former a part of People's Liberation Army of the Nationalist Party of China), and renamed as 219th Infantry Division (Chinese: 步兵第219师). The division was then transferred to 55th Corps' control.

== History ==
As of late 1952 the division was composed of:

- 655th Infantry Regiment;
- 656th Infantry Regiment;
- 657th Infantry Regiment;
- 545th Artillery Regiment.

In 1960 the division renamed as 219th Army Division (Chinese: 陆军第219师).

In January 1970 the division was renamed as 164th Army Division (Chinese: 陆军第164师). All its regiments were renamed as follows:

- 490th Infantry Regiment (former 655th);
- 491st Infantry Regiment (former 656th);
- 492nd Infantry Regiment (former 657th);
- Artillery Regiment (former 545th).

In February 1979 the division took part in the Sino-Vietnamese War. During the conflict it inflicted 2195 casualties and 10 POWs to opposing PAVN forces.

In October 1985 the division renamed as 164th Infantry Division (Chinese: 步兵第164师) and transferred to 41st Army's control following 55th Army Corps' disbandment.

From 1985 to 1998 it maintained as a Southern Infantry Division, Catalogue B.

In 1998, the division was transferred to People's Liberation Army Navy's control, under the command of South Sea Fleet, and reduced and renamed as 164th Marine Brigade (Chinese: 海军陆战第164旅).

== Composition ==
The brigade is now stationing in Zhanjiang, Guangdong, as one of the two major maneuver brigades of People's Liberation Army Marine Corps. Since then the brigade is composed of:

- Amphibious Armored Regiment;
  - Tank Battalion;
  - Amphibious Assault Battalion;
- Amphibious Reconnaissance Group;
- 1st Marine Battalion;
- 2nd Marine Battalion;
- 3rd Marine Battalion;
- Artillery Battalion;
- Missile Battalion – one MANPADS battery and one ATGM battery;
- Security-Communication Battalion;
- Engineer-NBC Battalion;
- Maintenance Battalion;
- Independent companies and detachments: Diving Company, Automobile Company, Medical Company, Training Team, Amphibious Reconnaissance Detachment, Helicopter Detachment.

In 2017 it was renamed to the 2nd Marine Brigade.
