= 165th Division (People's Republic of China) =

165th Army Division (1970-85)
- Active: 1970.1 - 1985.9
- Country: People's Republic of China
- Branch: People's Liberation Army
- Type: Division
- Role: Infantry
- Part of: 55th Army Corps
- Garrison/HQ: Longchuan, Guangdong
- Engagements: Vietnam War; Sino-Vietnamese War

The 165th Army Division (Chinese: 陆军第165师)(3rd Formation) was activated in January 1970 in Longchuan, Guangdong province.

The division was a part of 55th Army Corps. The division was composed of:

- 493rd Infantry Regiment;
- 494th Infantry Regiment;
- 495th Infantry Regiment;
- Artillery Regiment.

In February 1979 the division took part in the Sino-Vietnamese War.

In September 1985 the division was disbanded.
