= 165th meridian west =

Line of longitude

165th meridian west

The meridian 165° west of Greenwich is a line of longitude that extends from the North Pole across the Arctic Ocean, North America, the Pacific Ocean, the Southern Ocean, and Antarctica to the South Pole.

The 165th meridian west forms a great ellipse with the 15th meridian east.

The Samoa Time Zone and Phoenix Islands Time Zone is based on the mean solar time of this meridian.

== From Pole to Pole ==
Starting at the North Pole and heading south to the South Pole, the 165th meridian west passes through:

Co-ordinates	Country, territory or sea	Notes
90°0′N 165°0′W	Arctic Ocean	
71°46′N 165°0′W	Chukchi Sea	
68°53′N 165°0′W	United States	Alaska
67°54′N 165°0′W	Chukchi Sea	Kotzebue Sound
66°30′N 165°0′W	United States	Alaska — Seward Peninsula
64°26′N 165°0′W	Bering Sea	Norton Sound
62°32′N 165°0′W	United States	Alaska — Yukon–Kuskokwim Delta
60°21′N 165°0′W	Bering Sea	Passing just west of Unimak Island, Alaska, United States (at 54°34′N 164°56′W)
54°8′N 165°0′W	United States	Alaska — Tigalda Island
54°4′N 165°0′W	Pacific Ocean	
60°0′S 165°0′W	Southern Ocean	
78°33′S 165°0′W	Antarctica	Ross Dependency, claimed by New Zealand

== See also ==
- 164th meridian west
- 166th meridian west
