= 16th meridian east =

Line of longitude

16th meridian east

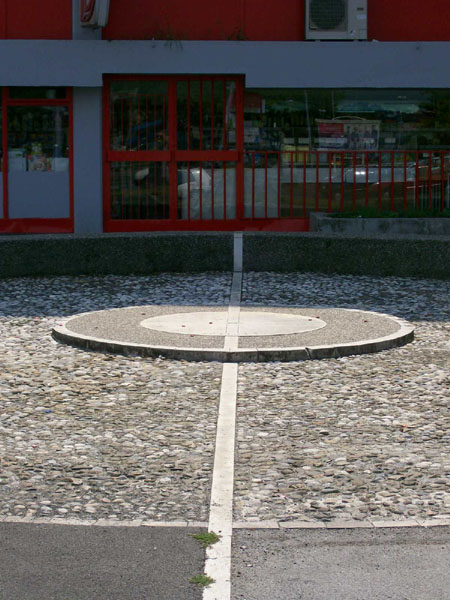
Monument marking the meridian in Zagreb, Croatia

The meridian 16° east of Greenwich is a line of longitude that extends from the North Pole across the Arctic Ocean, Europe, Africa, the Atlantic Ocean, the Southern Ocean, and Antarctica to the South Pole.

The 16th meridian east forms a great circle with the 164th meridian west.

== From Pole to Pole ==
Starting at the North Pole and heading south to the South Pole, the 16th meridian east passes through:

Co-ordinates	Country, territory or sea	Notes
90°0′N 16°0′E	Arctic Ocean	
80°1′N 16°0′E	Norway	Island of Spitsbergen, Svalbard
76°45′N 16°0′E	Atlantic Ocean	Greenland Sea; Norwegian Sea
69°18′N 16°0′E	Norway	Islands of Andøya and Hinnøya, and the mainland
66°52′N 16°0′E	Sweden	
56°12′N 16°0′E	Baltic Sea	
54°15′N 16°0′E	Poland	
50°36′N 16°0′E	Czech Republic	
48°47′N 16°0′E	Austria	
46°50′N 16°0′E	Slovenia	For about 11 km
46°43′N 16°0′E	Austria	For about 6 km
46°40′N 16°0′E	Slovenia	
46°18′N 16°0′E	Croatia	Passing through Zagreb, east of the city centre
45°13′N 16°0′E	Bosnia and Herzegovina	
44°38′N 16°0′E	Croatia	
43°29′N 16°0′E	Mediterranean Sea	Adriatic Sea
42°59′N 16°0′E	Croatia	Island of Biševo
42°57′N 16°0′E	Mediterranean Sea	Adriatic Sea
41°57′N 16°0′E	Italy	
41°40′N 16°0′E	Mediterranean Sea	Gulf of Manfredonia
41°26′N 16°0′E	Italy	
39°25′N 16°0′E	Mediterranean Sea	Tyrrhenian Sea
38°44′N 16°0′E	Italy	
37°55′N 16°0′E	Mediterranean Sea	
31°17′N 16°0′E	Libya	
23°27′N 16°0′E	Chad	The meridian enters Chad at the country's northernmost point, on the Tropic of Cancer
7°30′N 16°0′E	Central African Republic	
3°0′N 16°0′E	Cameroon	
1°45′N 16°0′E	Republic of the Congo	
3°44′S 16°0′E	Democratic Republic of the Congo	
5°52′S 16°0′E	Angola	
17°23′S 16°0′E	Namibia	
28°15′S 16°0′E	Atlantic Ocean	
60°0′S 16°0′E	Southern Ocean	
69°41′S 16°0′E	Antarctica	Queen Maud Land, claimed by Norway

== See also ==
- 15th meridian east
- 17th meridian east
