= Karaginsky Gulf =

Gulf in the Bering Sea

Coordinates: 59°26′00″N 164°00′00″E

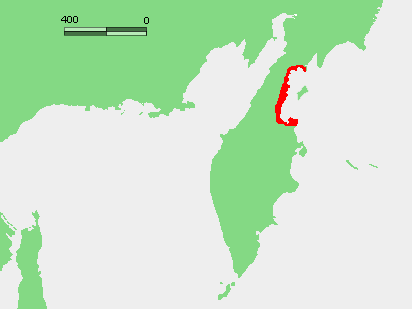
Location on the map.

Karaginsky Gulf (Russian: Карагинский залив) is a large gulf in the Bering Sea off the northeastern coast of Kamchatka (Russia), which cuts 117 km (73 mi) deep inland. The depth of the gulf is between 30 and 60 m (98 and 197 ft). The largest island in the gulf is the Karaginsky Island, separated from the mainland by the Litke Strait (width: 21 to 72 km (13 to 45 mi)). The Karaginsky Gulf is covered with ice from December until June.
