= 2022–23 South Pacific cyclone season =

Cyclone season in the South Pacific Ocean

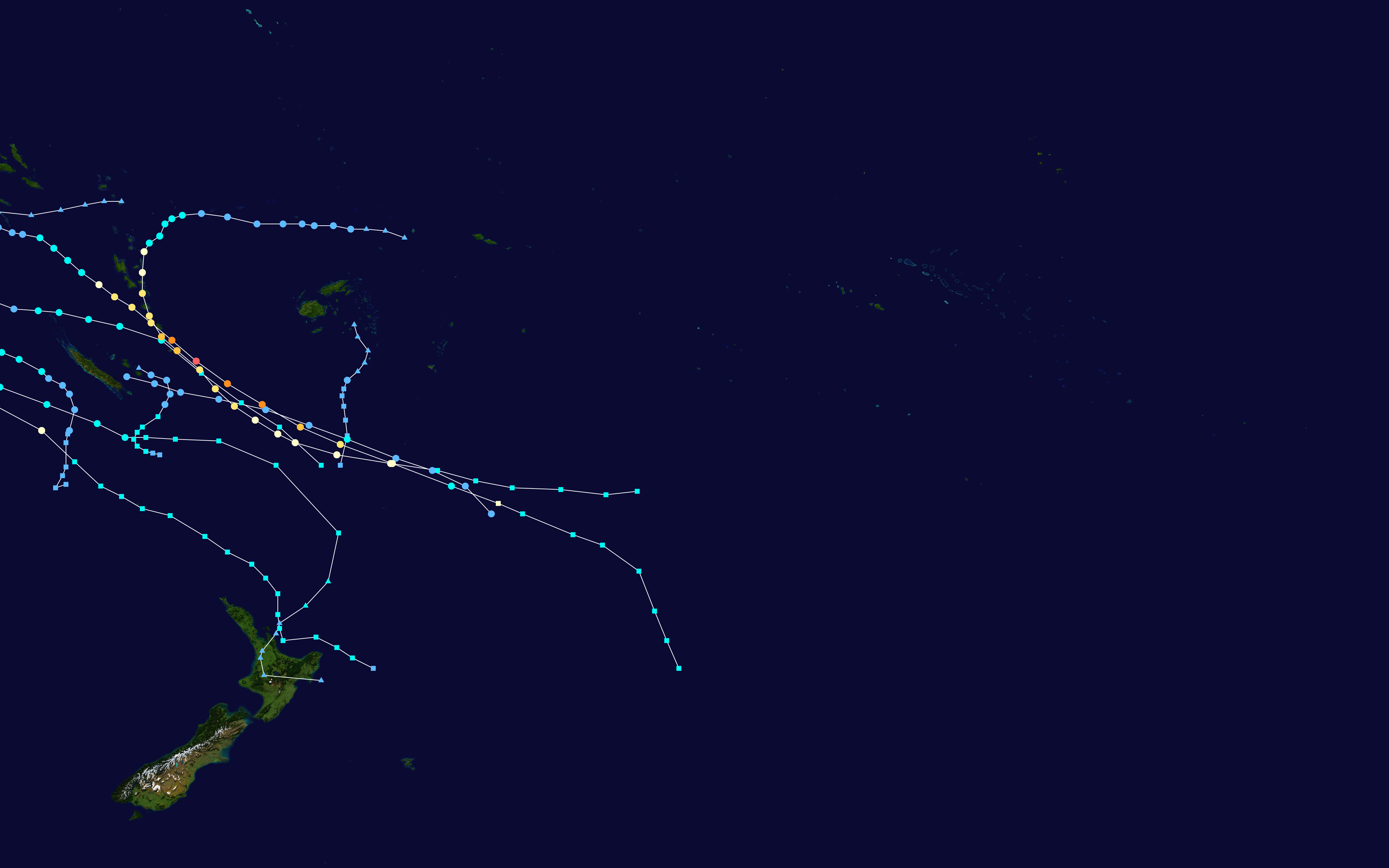
- Season summary map

Seasonal boundaries
- First system formed: December 10, 2022
- Last system dissipated: April 18, 2023

Strongest storm
- Name: Kevin
  - Maximum winds: 230 km/h (145 mph) (10-minute sustained)
  - Lowest pressure: 913 hPa (mbar)

Seasonal statistics
- Total disturbances: 13 official, 1 unofficial
- Total depressions: 7 official, 1 unofficial
- Tropical cyclones: 4 official, 1 unofficial
- Severe tropical cyclones: 3
- Total fatalities: 20 total
- Total damage: $11.1 billion (2022 USD) (Costliest South Pacific cyclone season recorded)

Related articles
- 2022–23 Australian region cyclone season; 2022–23 South-West Indian Ocean cyclone season

The 2022–23 South Pacific cyclone season was a below-average but very destructive tropical cyclone season that featured one of the costliest tropical cyclones in the Southern Hemisphere on record. The season officially started on November 1, 2022, and ended April 30, 2023; however, a tropical cyclone could form at any time between July 1, 2022, and June 30, 2023, and would count towards the season total. During the season, tropical cyclones were officially monitored by the Fiji Meteorological Service (FMS), Australian Bureau of Meteorology (BOM) and New Zealand's MetService. The United States Armed Forces through the Joint Typhoon Warning Center (JTWC) also monitored the basin, issuing unofficial warnings for American interests. The FMS attaches a number and an F suffix to tropical disturbances that form in or move into the basin while the JTWC designates significant tropical cyclones with a number and a P suffix. The BoM, FMS and MetService all use the Australian Tropical Cyclone Intensity Scale and estimate windspeeds with a period of approximately ten minutes, while the JTWC estimates sustained winds over a 1-minute period, which are subsequently compared to the Saffir–Simpson hurricane wind scale (SSHWS).

== Seasonal forecasts ==
Source/Record	Region	Tropical Cyclones	Severe Tropical Cyclones	Refs
Records
Average (1969–70 – 2021–22):	160°E – 120°W	7	3	
Record high:	160°E – 120°W	1997–98: 16	1982–83: 10	
Record low:	160°E – 120°W	1990–91: 2	2008–09: 0	
Predictions
CWCL July	135°E – 120°W	6–9	—N/a	
CWCL August	135°E – 120°W	6–9	—N/a	
CWCL September	135°E – 120°W	7–10	—N/a	
CWCL October	135°E – 120°W	6–10	—N/a	
NIWA October	135°E – 120°W	6–10	3–4	
FMS Whole	160°E – 120°W	5–7	1–4	
FMS Western	160°E – 180°	3–6	1–3	
FMS Eastern	180° – 120°W	2–4	1–2	

Ahead of the season officially starting on November 1, the Fiji Meteorological Service (FMS), Australian Bureau of Meteorology (BoM), National Institute of Water and Atmospheric Research (NIWA) and the University of Newcastle's Australian Centre for Water, Climate and Land (ACWCL), each issued a tropical cyclone outlook that discussed the upcoming season. These outlooks took into account a variety of factors such as a persistent La Niña event and what had happened in previous seasons such as 1971–72, 1974–75, 1975–76, 1984–85, 2000–01, 2008–09, 2011–12 and 2017–18.

The first three of these outlooks were issued in July, August and September by the ACWCL, suggesting that it would be a near-normal season, with six to nine tropical cyclones occurring between 135°E and 120°W during the season. During October 2022, the ACWCL joined NIWA, BoM, MetService and various Pacific meteorological services with contributing towards the Southwest Pacific tropical cyclone outlook. This outlook suggested that between six and ten named tropical cyclones would occur between 135°E and 120°W, while three to four of these tropical cyclones were expected to intensify into either a Category 3, 4 or 5 severe tropical cyclone on the Australian tropical cyclone intensity scale.

In addition to contributing towards the Southwest Pacific tropical cyclone outlook, the FMS and the BoM issued their own seasonal forecasts for the South Pacific region. The BoM predicted that their self-defined western region had a 65% chance of seeing activity above its average of 4 tropical cyclones, while its self-defined eastern region had a 43% chance of seeing more than 6 tropical cyclones. Within their outlook the FMS predicted that between five and seven tropical cyclones would occur within the basin compared to an average of around 7. One these tropical cyclones was expected to intensify further and become either a Category 3, 4 or 5 severe tropical cyclone on the Australian tropical cyclone intensity scale. The FMS also predicted that the majority of systems would occur to the west of the International Dateline, with 3–6 tropical cyclones expected to occur between 160°E and 180° while 2–4 were expected to occur between 180° and 120°W.

== Systems ==
=== Tropical Disturbance 01F ===
- Tropical disturbance (Australian scale)
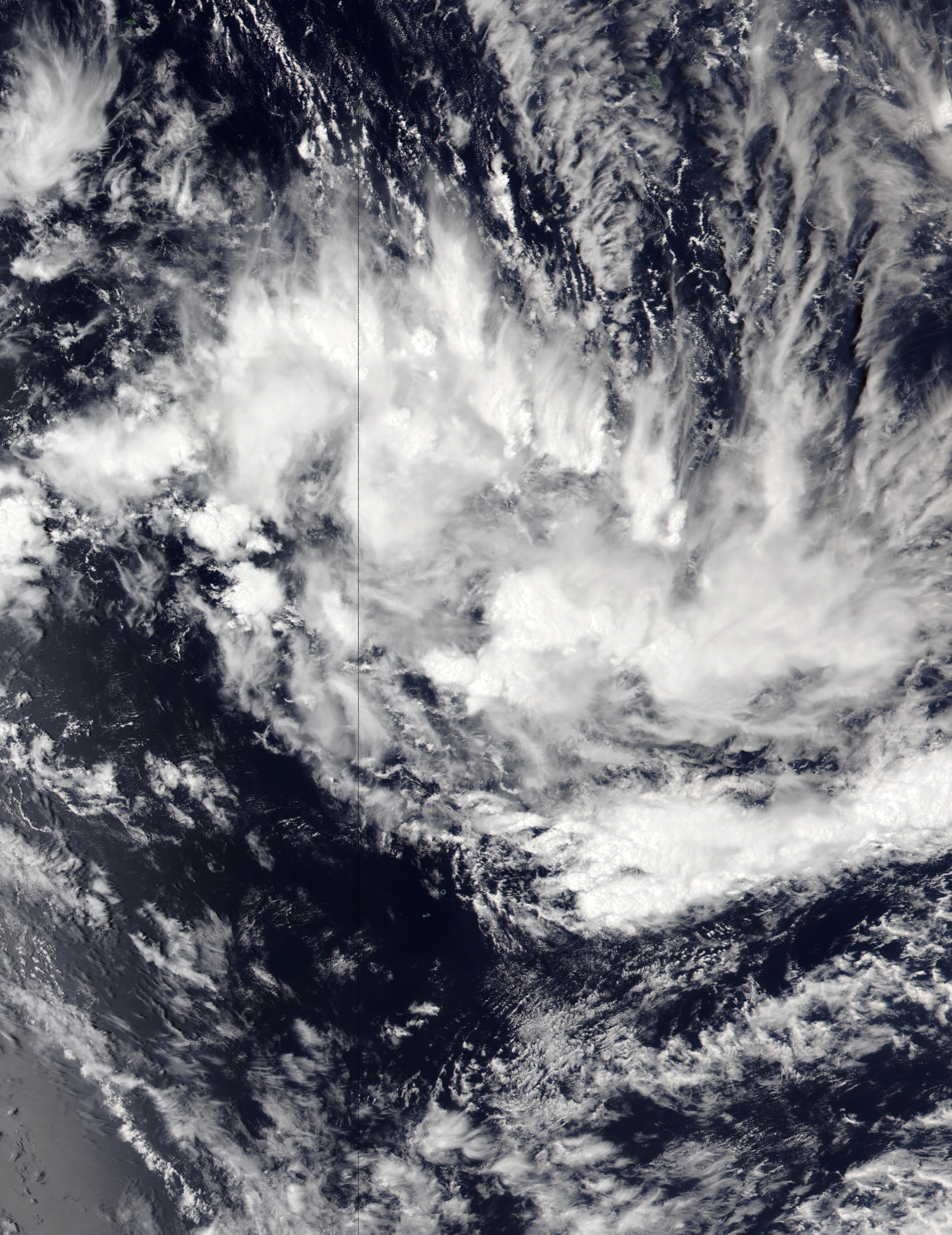
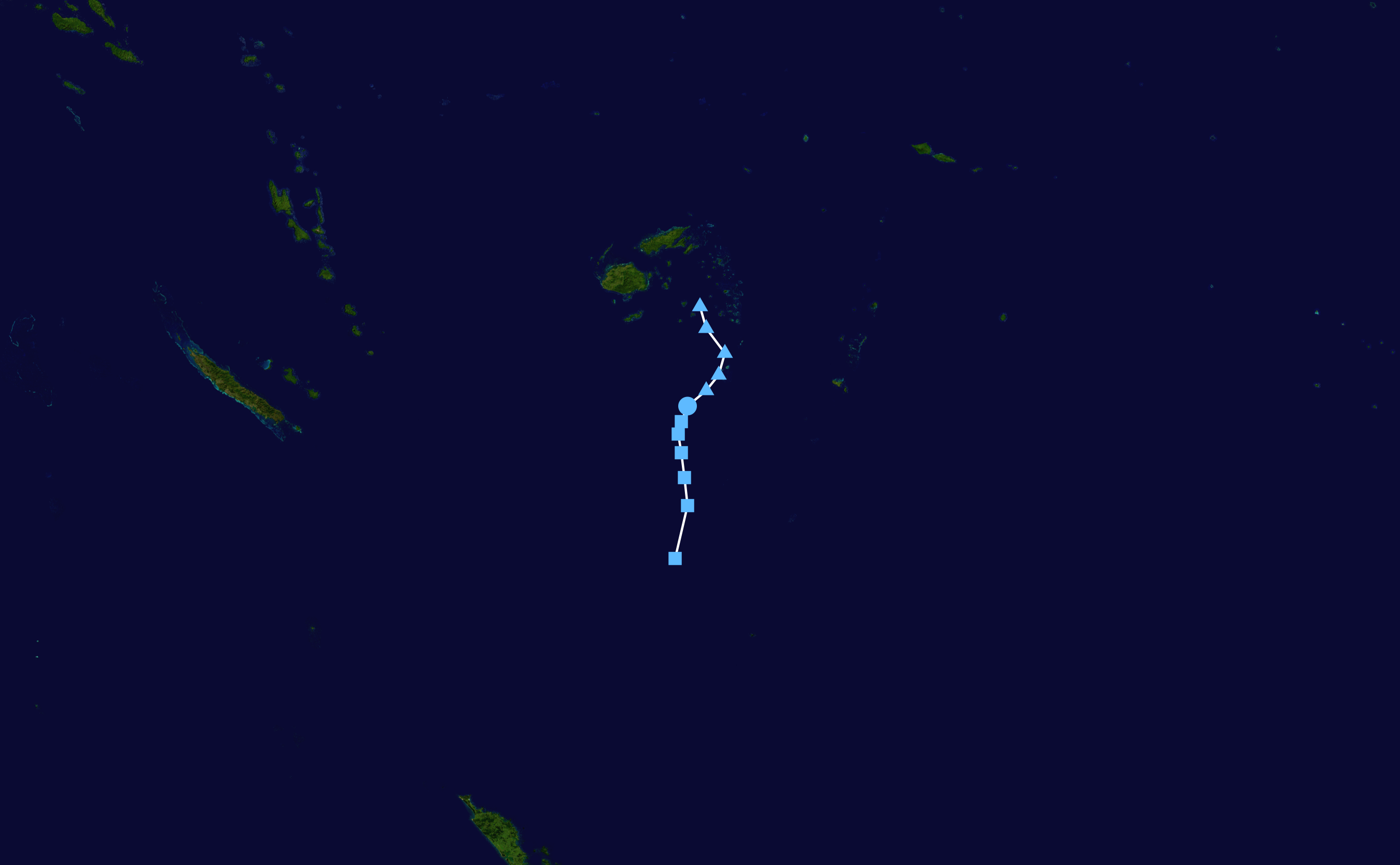
- Duration: December 10 – December 12
- Peak intensity: 45 km/h (30 mph) (10-min); 1005 hPa (mbar)

On December 10, the FMS reported that Tropical Disturbance 01F had developed, within an area of low vertical windshear near Fiji's southern Lau Islands. Moving southward under a moderate sheared environment with warm sea surface temperatures, 01F intensified into a tropical depression late on December 11, before being steered into a highly sheared environment due to an upper ridge to its north and an approaching upper trough from its west.

=== Tropical Disturbance 02F ===
- Tropical disturbance (Australian scale)
- Subtropical storm (SSHWS)
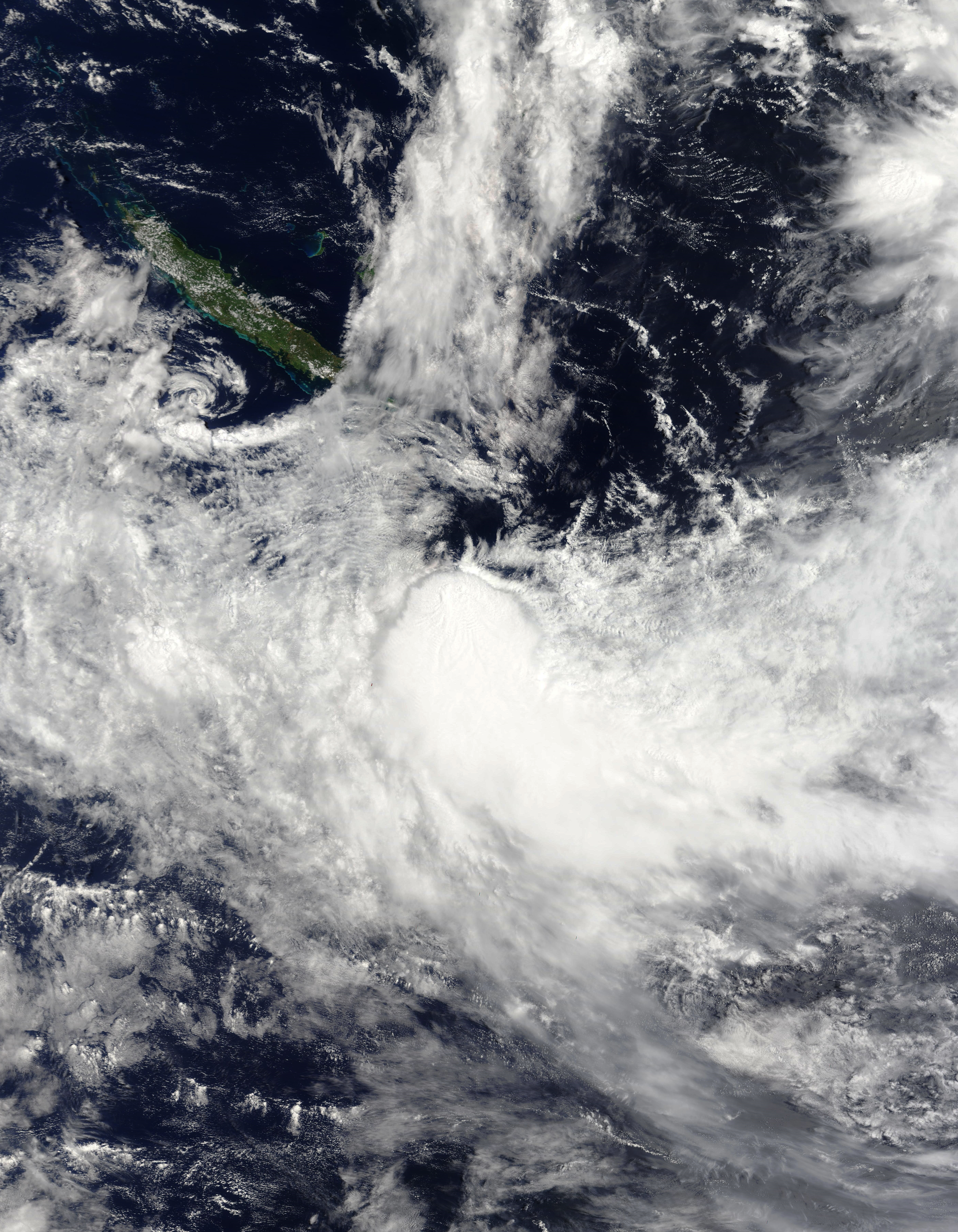
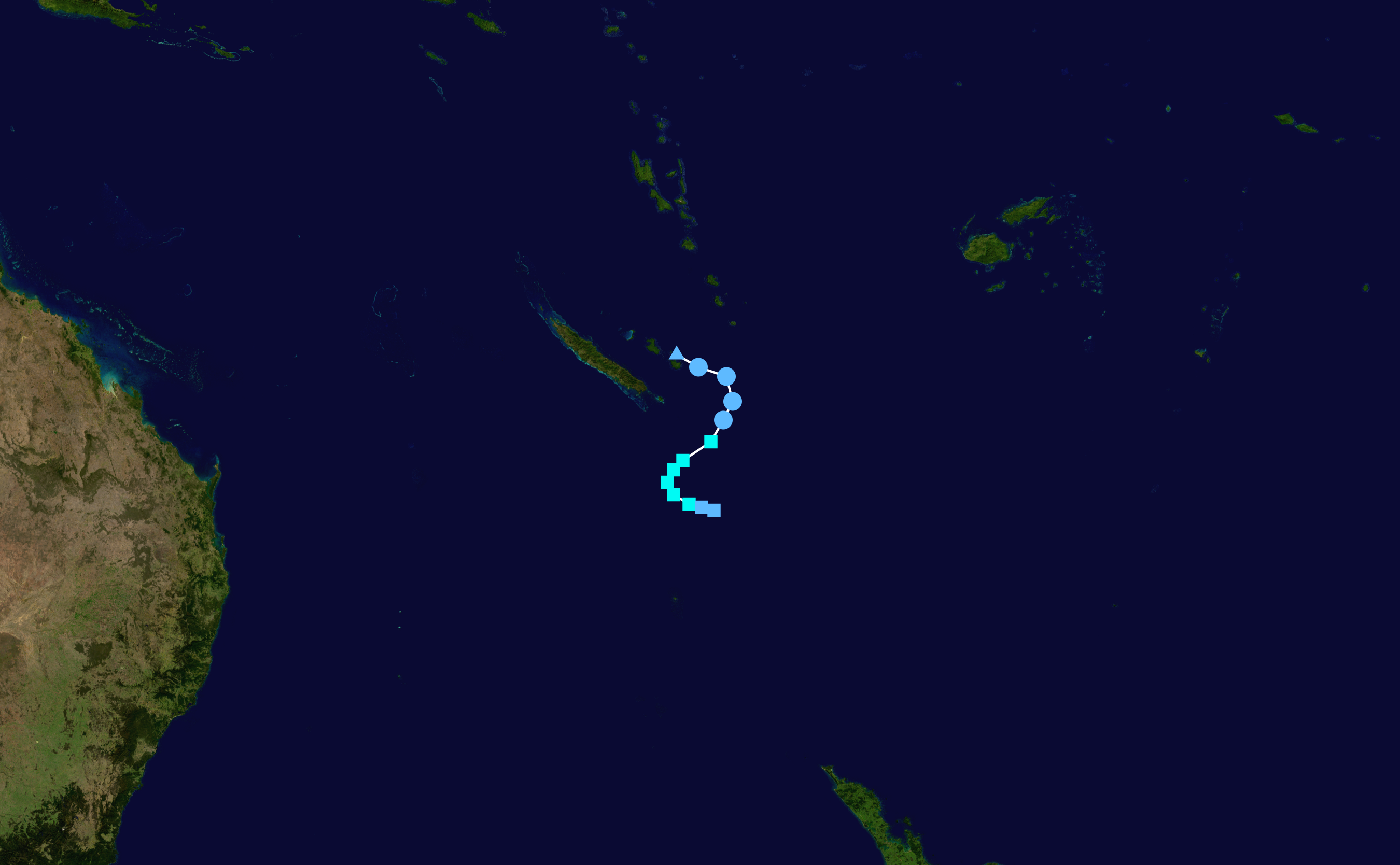
- Duration: December 29 – December 31
- Peak intensity: 45 km/h (30 mph) (10-min); 999 hPa (mbar)

Late on December 29, the FMS reported that Tropical Disturbance 02F had developed to the south of Vanuatu. The JTWC gave it a low chance for development due to the system having a fully obscured LLC and in a favorable environment of low wind shear, good poleward outflow and warm sea surface temperatures. At 3:00 UTC on December 30, the JTWC announced that the system had transitioned into a subtropical cyclone; however, the agency gave the system a low chance to develop into tropical cyclone due to persistent unfavorable environment. The system then moved into TCWC Wellington's area of responsibility on the next day, where it was reclassified as a non-tropical low.

=== Tropical Disturbance 03F ===
- Tropical disturbance (Australian scale)
- Tropical storm (SSHWS)
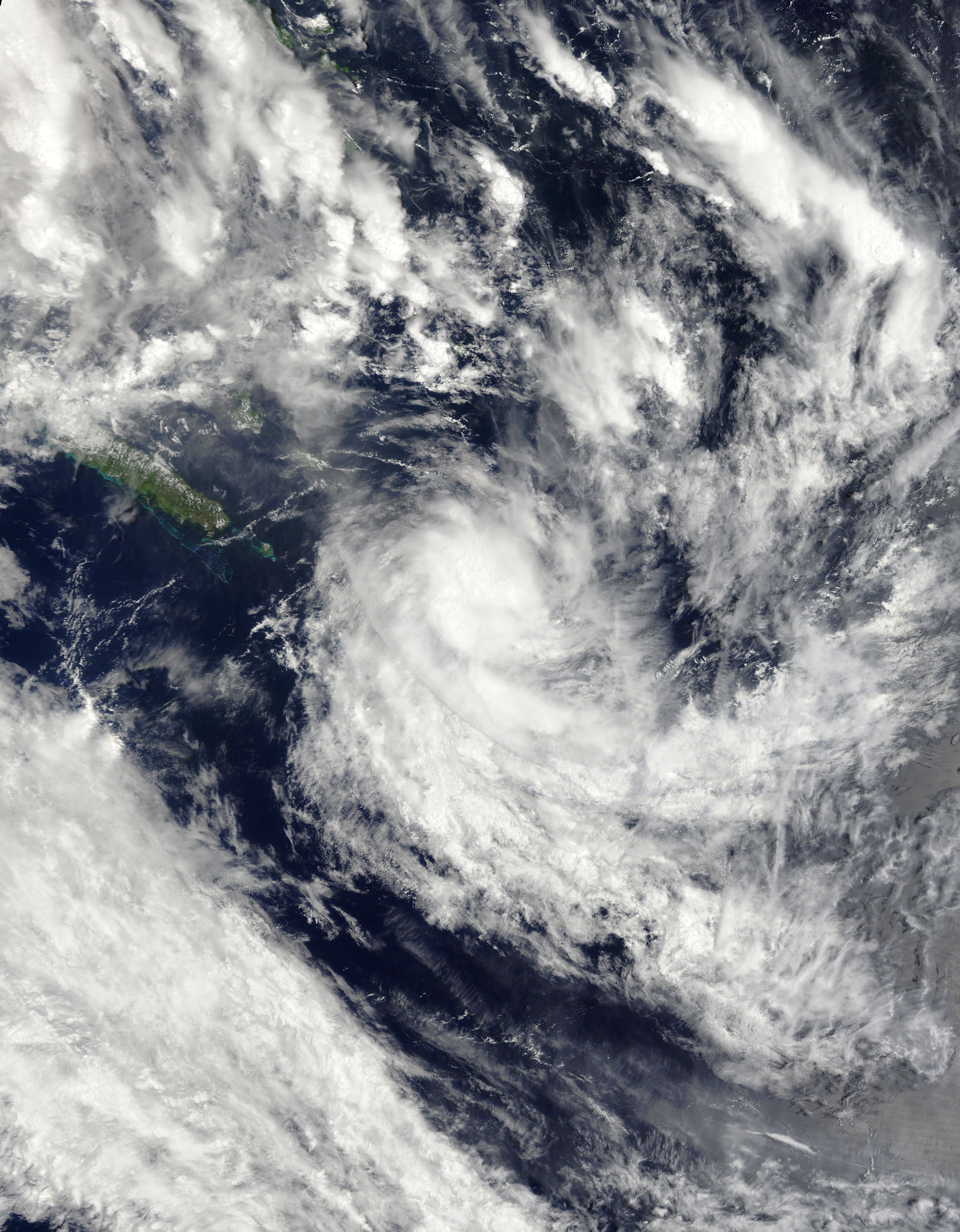
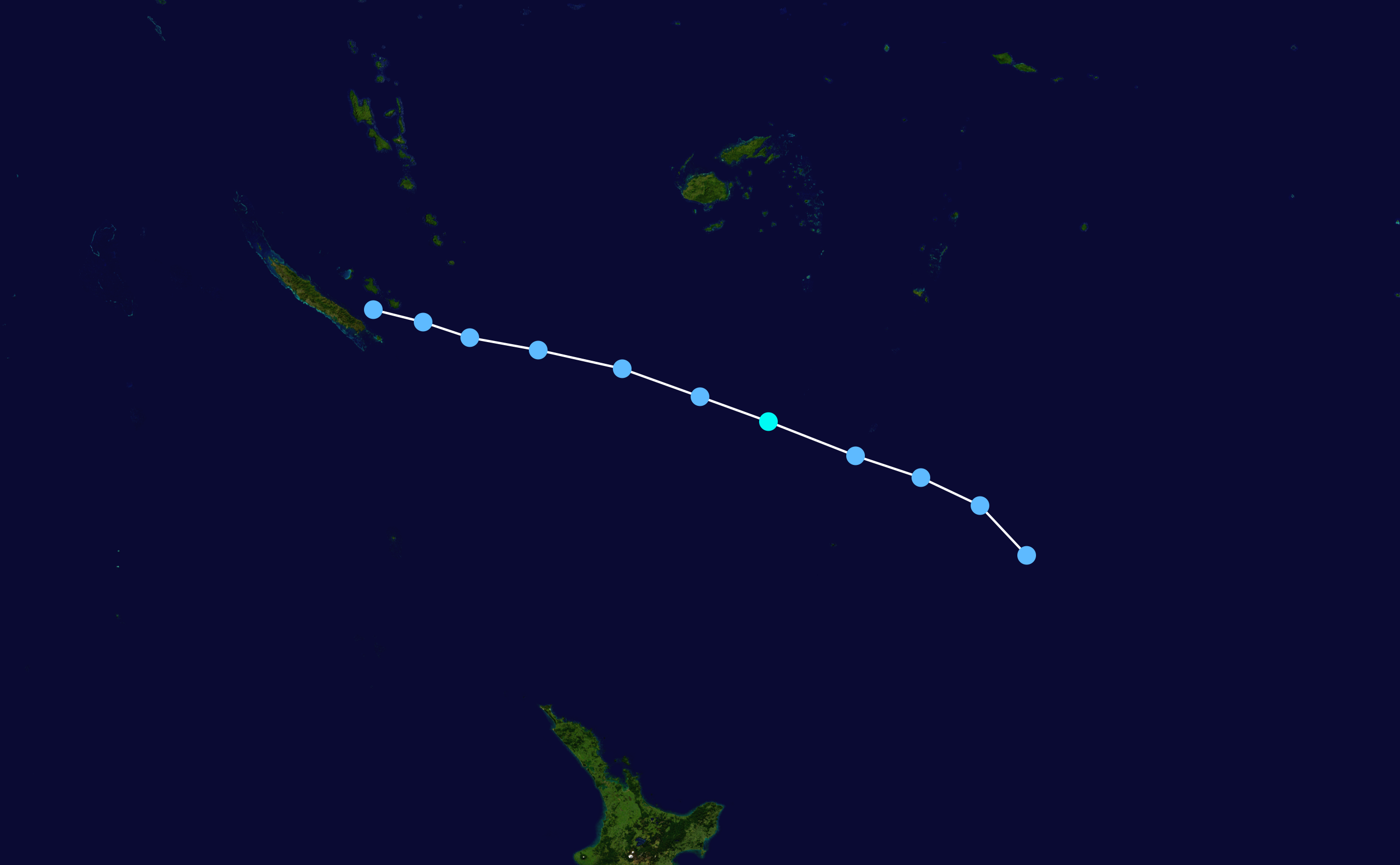
- Duration: January 5 – January 7
- Peak intensity: 45 km/h (30 mph) (10-min); 1000 hPa (mbar)

Late on January 5, the FMS reported that Tropical Disturbance 03F had formed near New Caledonia. The system generally moved southeast before the FMS ceased advisories on the system, on January 7. However, on January 8, the JTWC gave the system's chance for development, although in favorable environment, as low since it was in close proximity with Hale. But upon reanalysis, convection re-fired, and an eye feature was visible, although the JTWC later reported that the system had dissipated the following day.

=== Tropical Depression Hale ===
- Tropical depression (Australian scale)
- Tropical storm (SSHWS)
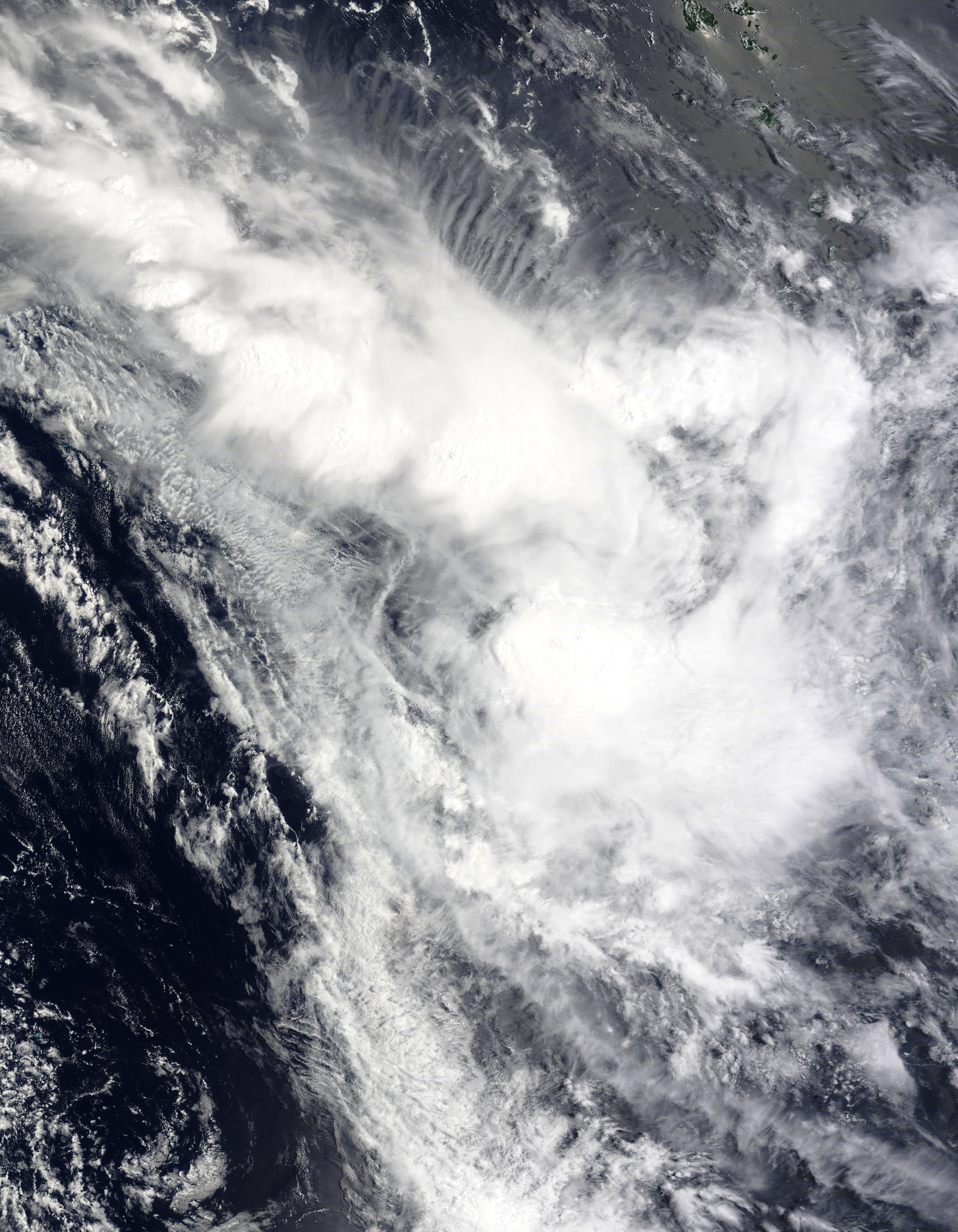
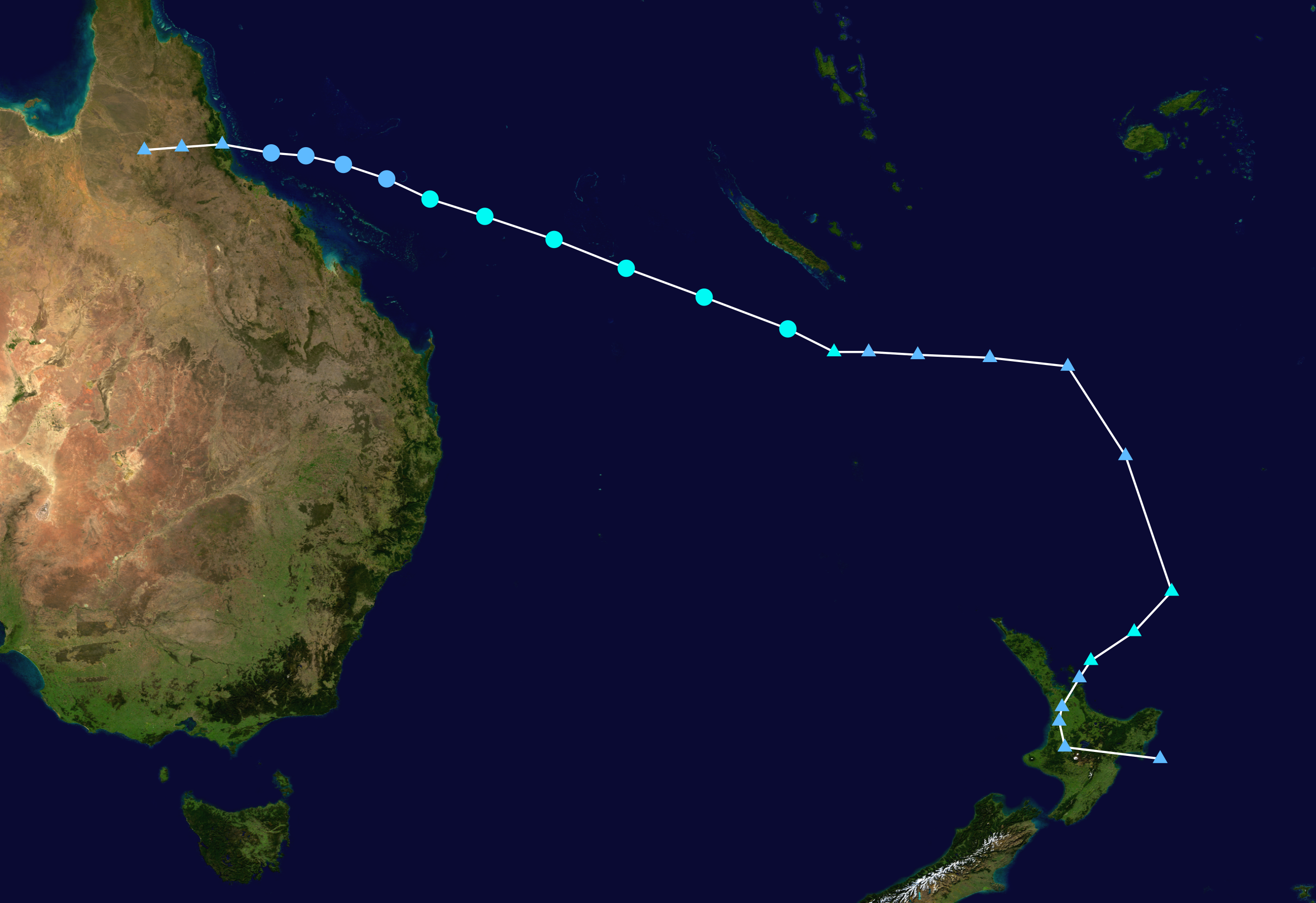
- Duration: January 7 (Entered basin) – January 8
- Peak intensity: 55 km/h (35 mph) (10-min); 994 hPa (mbar)

On January 7, Tropical Low 07U crossed into the basin from the Australian region, where it was reclassified as Tropical Depression 04F by the FMS. Later that day, the storm would feel the effects of moderate wind shear, with its convective structure splitting into two different regions, before it started to weaken as shear increased and its low-level center became elongated. The FMS issued their last advisory on Hale by the next day as it moved east-southeast towards the TCWC Wellington's area of responsibility, where they reclassified it as an extratropical low six hours later. The JTWC subsequently discontinued warnings on the system three hours later.

In preparation for Hale, MetService issued heavy rain and wind warnings for many parts of New Zealand. A state of emergency was later declared in the northeastern part of New Zealand as it approached the country. Hale caused widespread flooding and slips in northern and eastern parts of the country on January 10 and 11, particularly in the Coromandel and Gisborne areas. Washed away forestry slash clogged many rivers in the Gisborne region, exacerbating the flooding and accumulating around bridges downstream. Several metres of foreshore was eroded away by the storm surge in Whitianga, threatening waterfront buildings such as the Mercury Bay Boating Club. A child was killed on Waikanae Beach on January 25, two weeks after Hale impacted the country, after falling while playing on forestry slash debris left behind by the cyclone.

In real-time, the FMS assessed Hale peaking as a Category 1 tropical cyclone, however in their seasonal summary, the FMS would downgrade Hale to a tropical depression.

=== Tropical Cyclone Irene ===
- Category 2 tropical cyclone (Australian scale)
- Tropical storm (SSHWS)
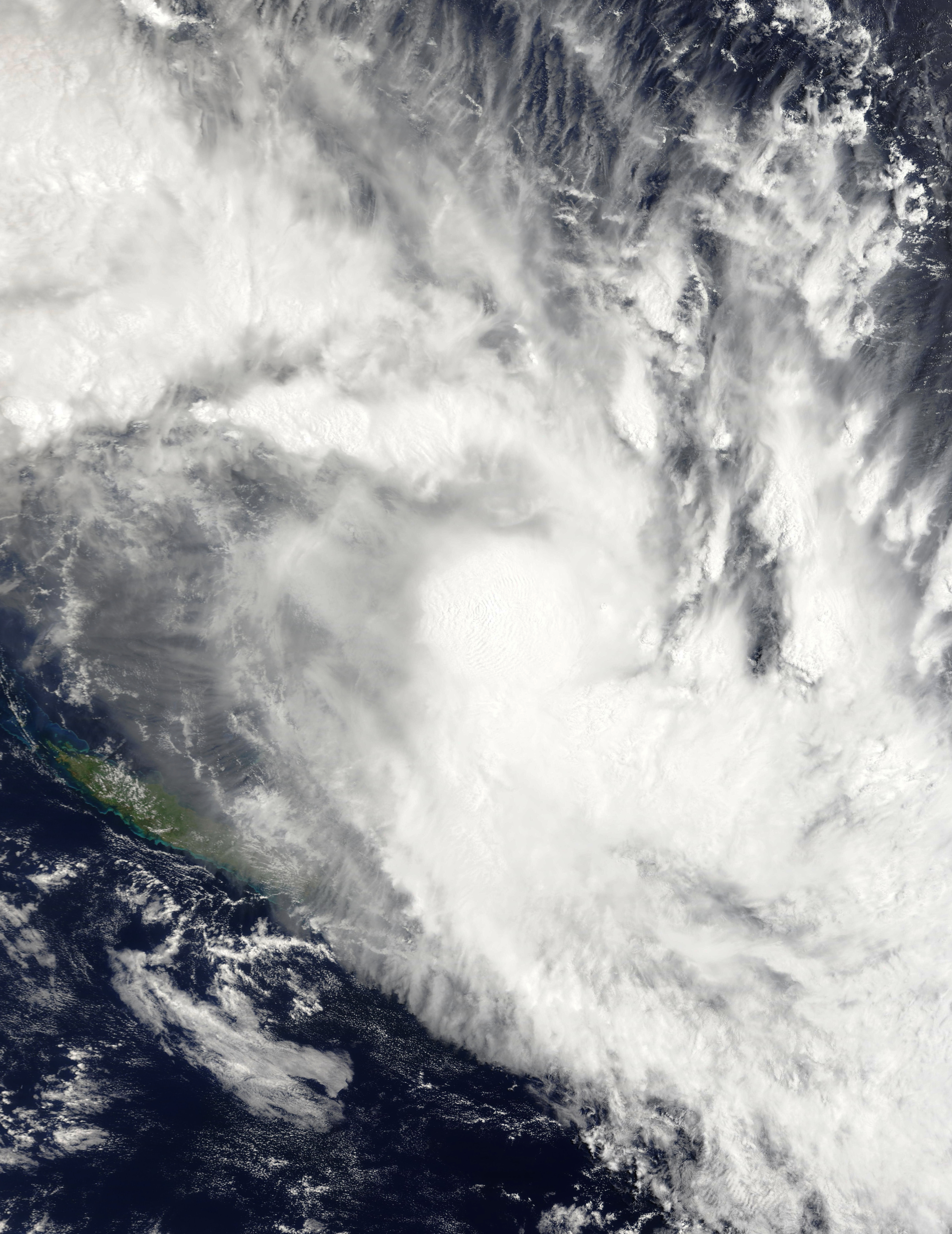
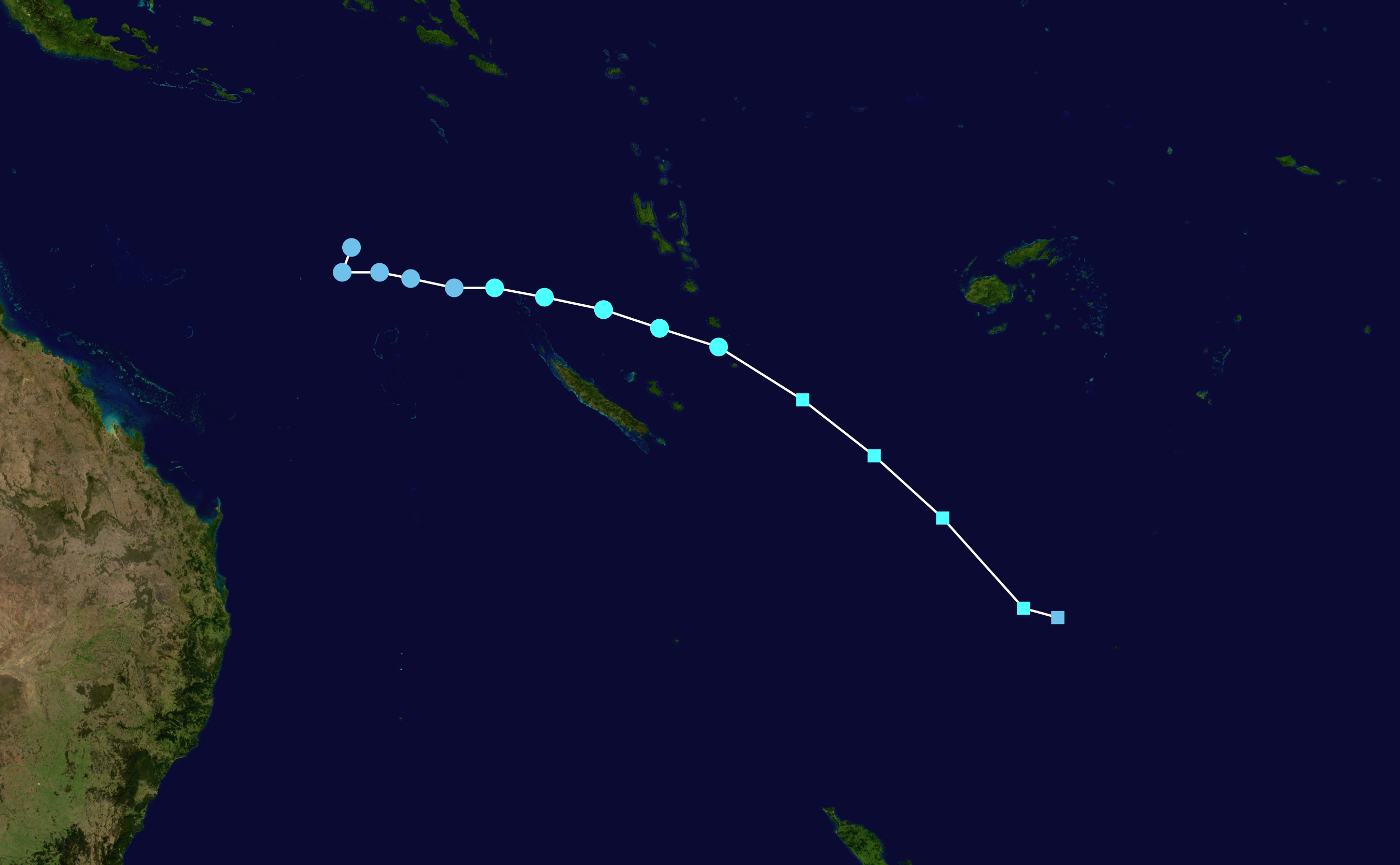
- Duration: January 14 – January 19 (Out of basin on 16–17 January)
- Peak intensity: 100 km/h (65 mph) (10-min); 980 hPa (mbar)

By early January 13, the FMS noted that a low pressure system was expected to develop to the west of Vanuatu in the next 5 days, and gave it a moderate chance of development. However, the low formed in the Australian region late on the same day, and by January 14, it organized into a tropical disturbance, with the FMS designating it as 05F. 05F briefly entered the basin by the next day, before subsequently moving back to the Australian region late by the same day.

By January 17, 05F moved back into the South Pacific basin, where it was upgraded to a tropical depression by the FMS. At 03:00 UTC on January 18, the JTWC's began issuing warnings on the system, classifying it as Tropical Cyclone 09P. The FMS subsequently followed suit, upgrading the system into a Category 1 tropical cyclone on the Australian scale and naming it Irene. At that time, satellite imagery showed Irene was quickly developing a central dense overcast (CDO). Under a favorable environment of warm sea surface temperatures, low wind shear and strong poleward outflow, Irene intensified into a Category 2 tropical cyclone late on the same day. However, as it moved over Tanna Island in Vanuatu, its weakly defined and elongated low-level circulation center quickly became exposed due to the wind shear, prompting the JTWC to issue its final warning on Irene and reclassify the system as a subtropical cyclone by January 19. The FMS subsequently downgraded Irene into a Category 1 tropical cyclone, and continued to issue warnings as it weakened while moving east-southeast, before declaring the system an extratropical cyclone late on the same day. Irene was last noted the next day.

A heavy rain alert was issued for some parts of Fiji and the public was advised to be on high alert. Similar warnings were also issued to Vanuatu. On January 19, Irene caused flooding and power cuts in Port Villa.

=== Tropical Depression 06F ===
- Tropical depression (Australian scale)
- Tropical storm (SSHWS)
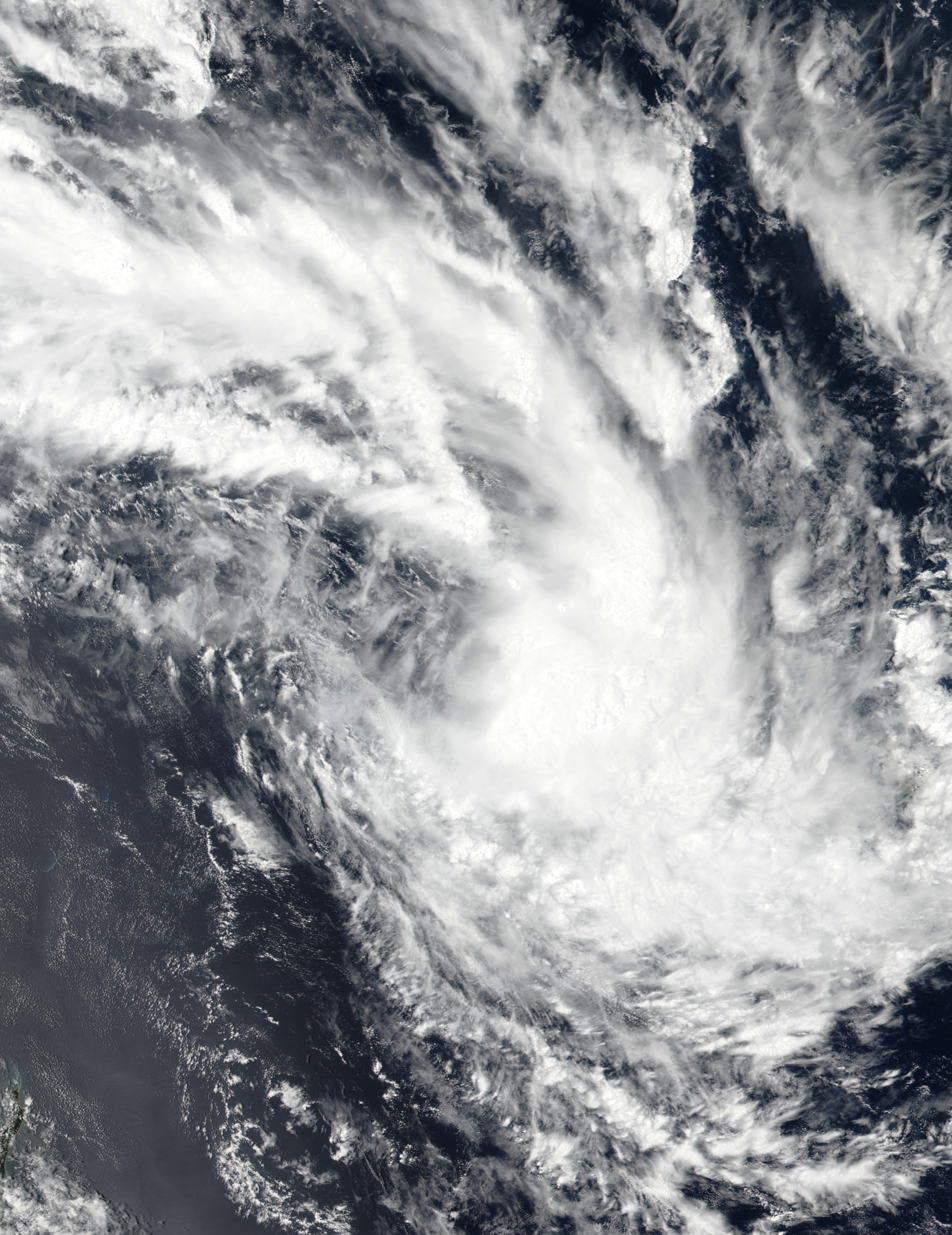
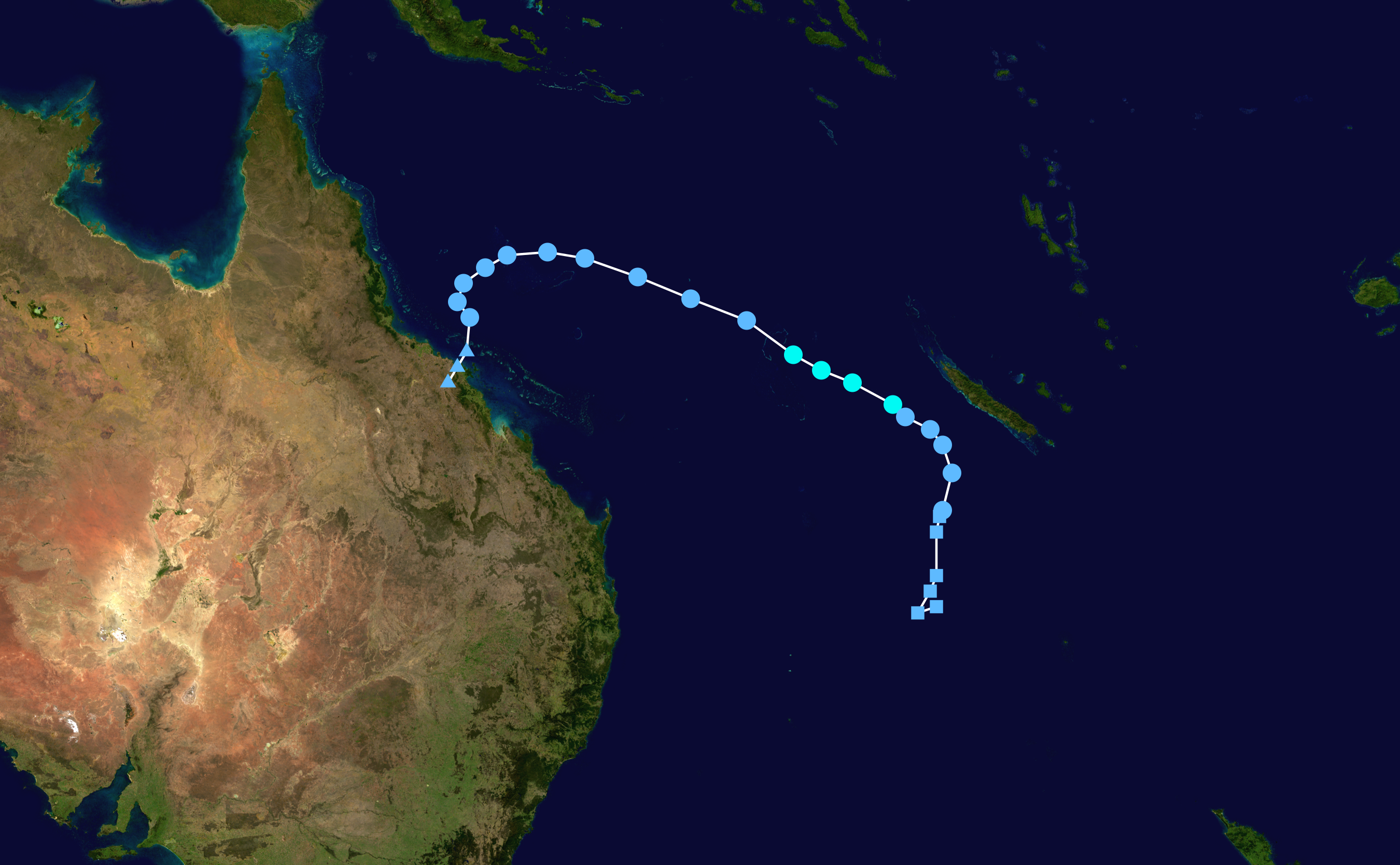
- Duration: January 20 (Entered basin) – January 22
- Peak intensity: 55 km/h (35 mph) (10-min); 996 hPa (mbar)

On January 20, a tropical low entered the basin from the Australian region, where it was immediately designated as Tropical Depression 06F by the FMS. Later that day, the JTWC would recognize the system as a tropical cyclone, designating it as Tropical Cyclone 10P, although the system was becoming exposed due to a dry air infiltration. With the system becoming fully exposed due to increasing wind shear and large amounts of dry air, the JTWC would issue their final advisory on 06F the next day. The FMS continued to issue advisories on 06F as it continued east-southeast, before it turned south-southwest and degenerated into a low pressure area on January 22. The remnants of the system impacted New Zealand on January 27, causing severe flooding which killed 4 people and resulted in US$1.2 billion in damages.

=== Severe Tropical Cyclone Gabrielle ===
- Category 3 severe tropical cyclone (Australian scale)
- Category 1 tropical cyclone (SSHWS)
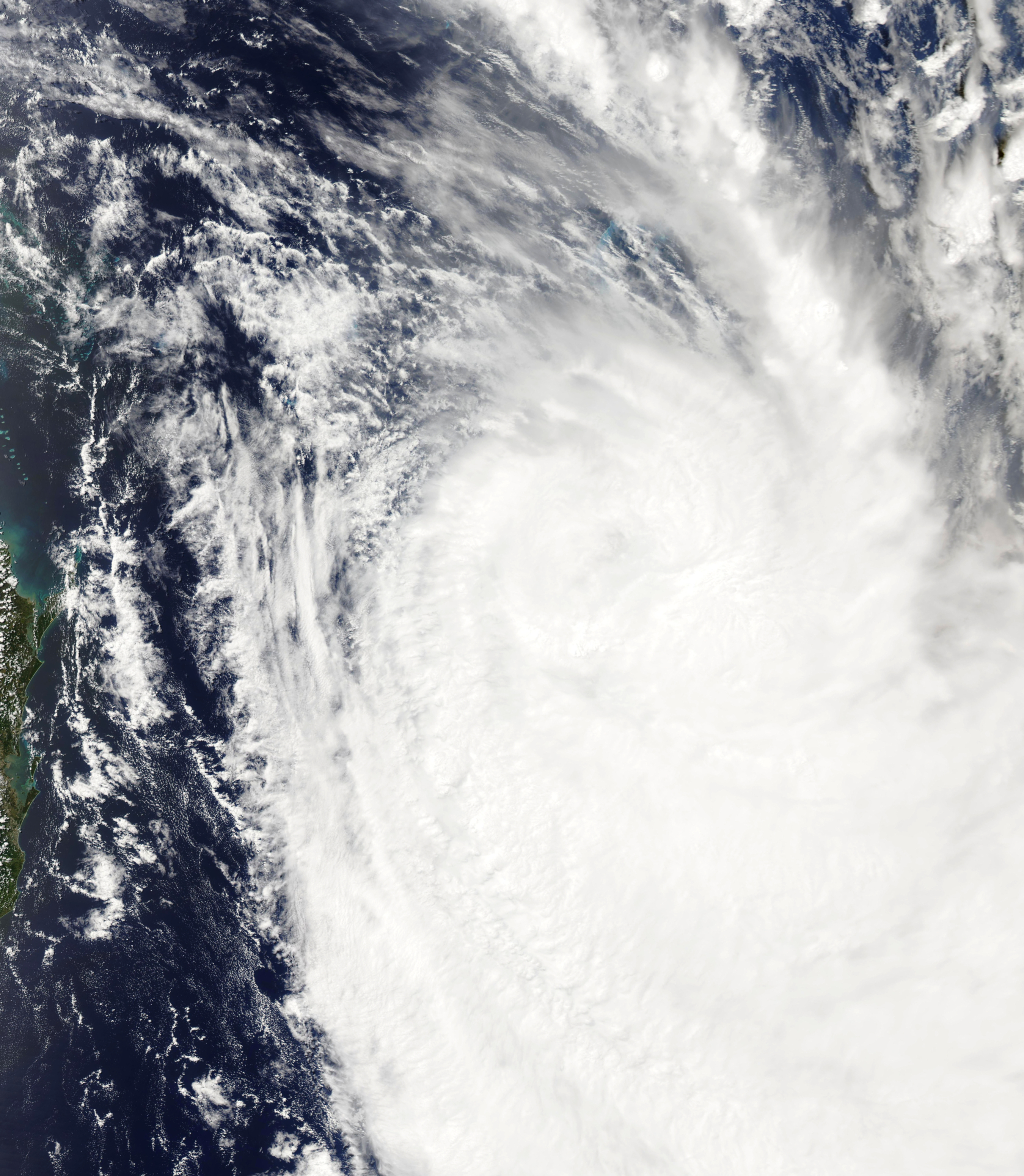
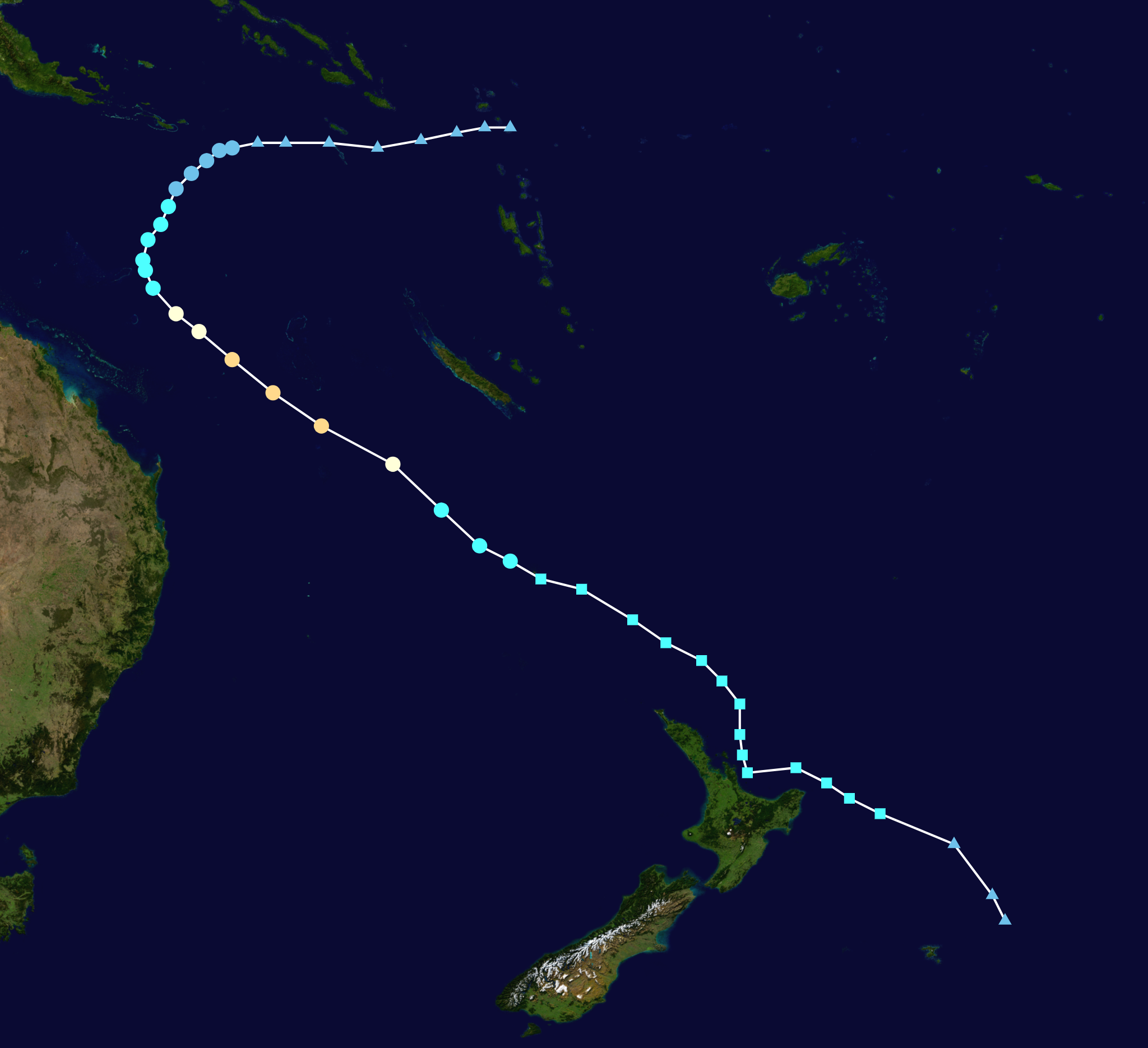
- Duration: February 10 (Entered basin) – February 11
- Peak intensity: 150 km/h (90 mph) (10-min); 958 hPa (mbar)

On February 10, Severe Tropical Cyclone Gabrielle moved into the basin from the Australian region, as a Category 3 severe tropical cyclone on the Australian scale. Gabrielle began to experience an increase in northwesterly vertical wind shear, the JTWC downgraded it to a Category 1-equivalent cyclone. Later that day, Gabrielle moved into MetService's area of responsibility. By 21:00 UTC, the low-level circulation became fully exposed on the central convection, the JTWC discontinued warnings on the system. Later the next day, Gabrielle was downgraded to a Category 2 tropical cyclone by the MetService. Gabrielle subsequently passed directly over Norfolk Island. The BoM and MetService reported that Gabrielle had transitioned into a deep subtropical low later that day. The JTWC classified it as a subtropical storm.

Weather warnings were issued across Norfolk Island and New Zealand, with multiple states of emergency being declared in New Zealand as the cyclone impacted the country. Heavy rain and strong winds led to widespread power outages and flooding across the upper North Island, with a national state of emergency being declared on February 14. Two people were killed in Muriwai, while eight others were killed in Hawke's Bay, and one person killed in Gisborne. New Zealand declared a national state of emergency for the third time in its history on February 14 as Cyclone Gabrielle caused widespread flooding, landslides and huge ocean swells.

=== Severe Tropical Cyclone Judy ===
- Category 4 severe tropical cyclone (Australian scale)
- Category 3 tropical cyclone (SSHWS)
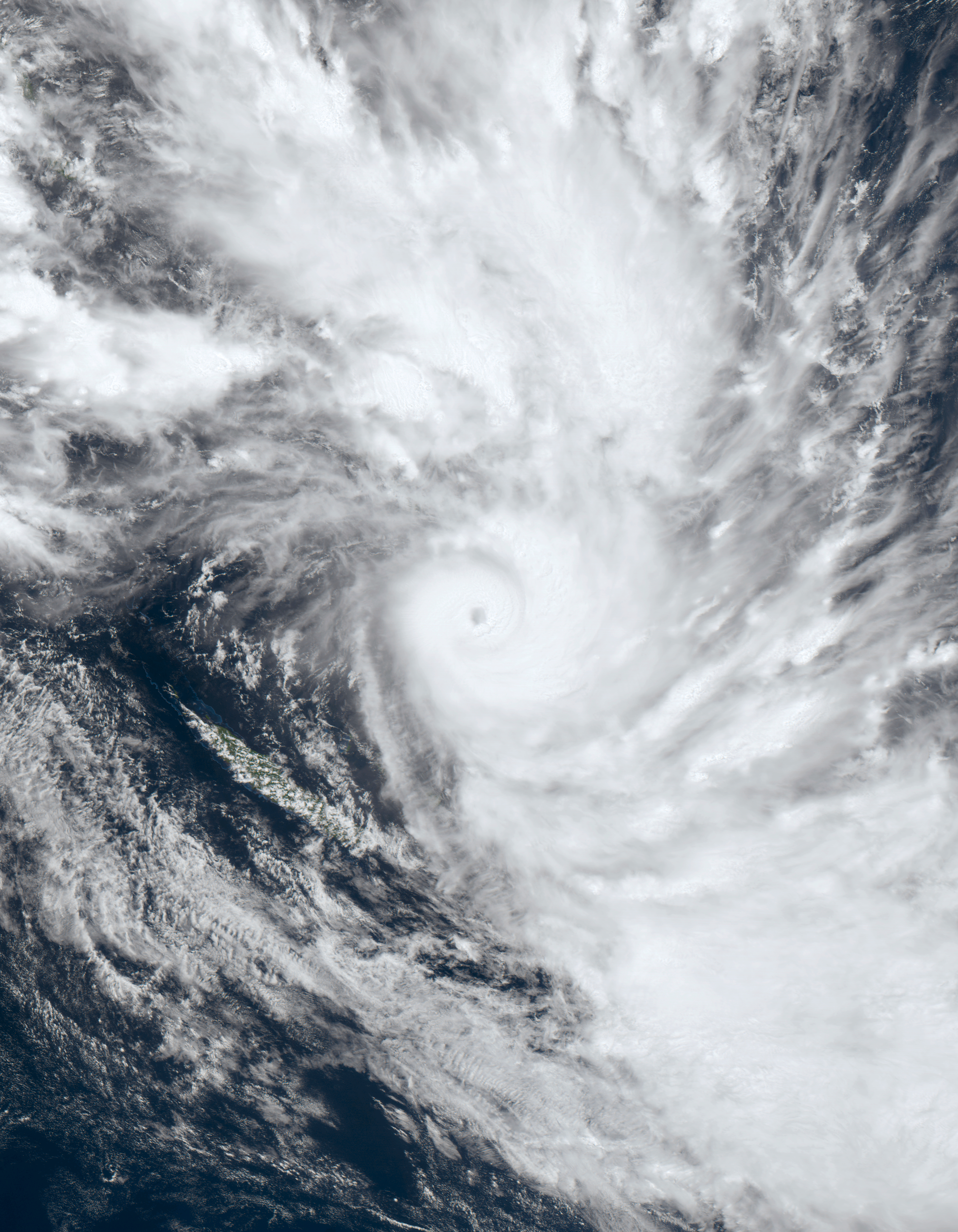
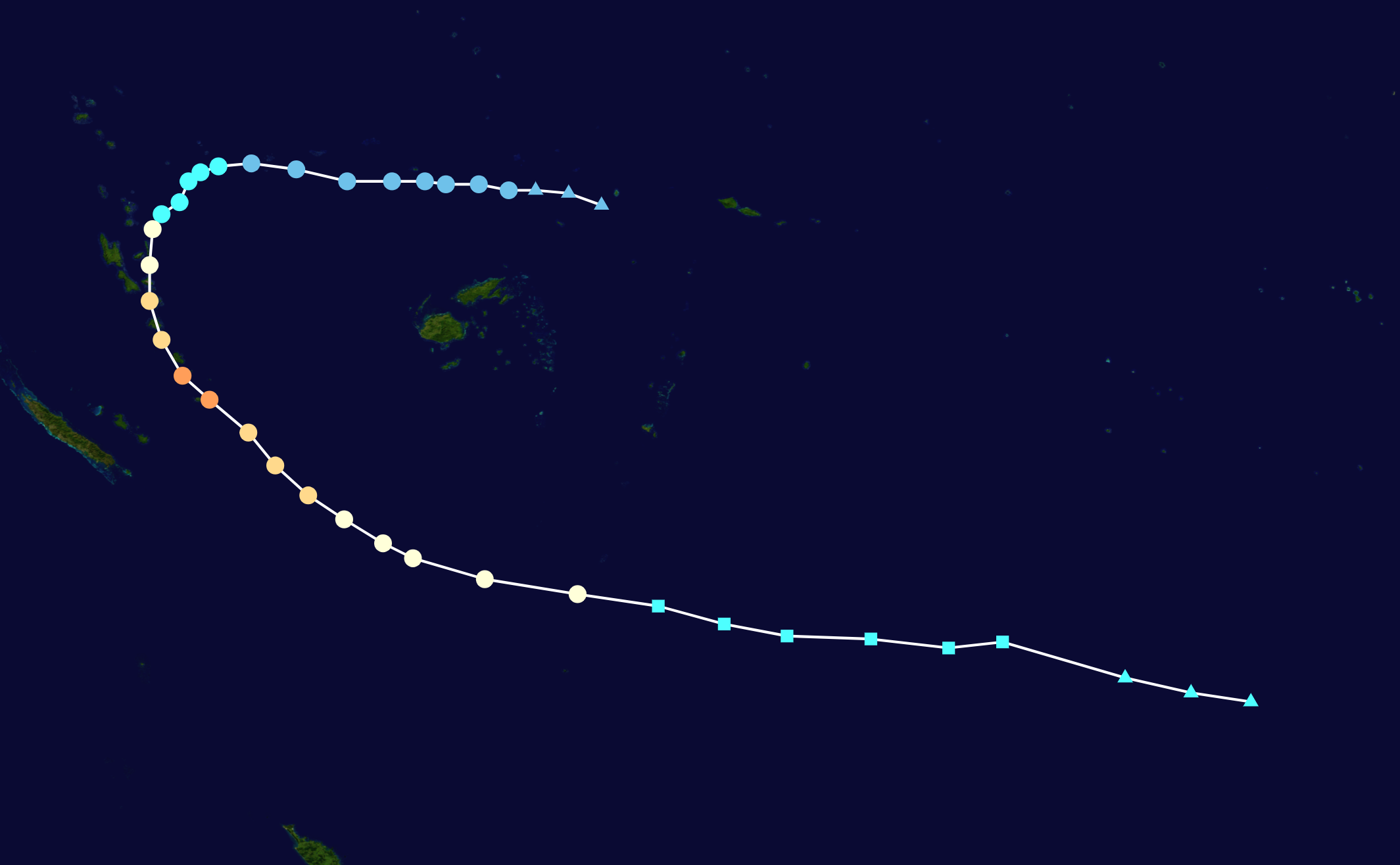
- Duration: February 23 – March 4
- Peak intensity: 185 km/h (115 mph) (10-min); 940 hPa (mbar)

On February 22, the FMS reported that a low-pressure system was located just south of Samoa, and gave it a low chance of formation into a tropical cyclone in the next 5 days. Under a moderate sheared environment and warm sea surface temperatures, the system organized into a tropical disturbance late on the next day, with the FMS designating it as 08F. The disturbance steered southwest from a subtropical ridge on February 26 after upgrading to a tropical depression. During February 26, the JTWC issued a Tropical Cyclone Formation Alert (TCFA) on the system. The system was upgraded to a Category 1 tropical cyclone and attained the name Judy from the FMS after improved organization the same day. The JTWC also upgraded the system to Tropical Cyclone on February 27, initiating advisories on it as Tropical Cyclone 15P. Judy further developed due to high sea surface temperatures of 30 °C (86 °F), leading to the FMS to upgrade its status to Category 2 tropical cyclone the same day, before upgrading further to a Category 3 severe tropical cyclone on February 28. Judy eventually became a Category 4 on the Australian scale and Category 3 on the SSHWS. The system began to weaken as it headed southeastward, entering the area of responsibility of the MetService. The JTWC issued their last warning on the system on March 3 as it transitioned to a subtropical cyclone. At the same time, the MetService had downgraded the system to Category 2 tropical cyclone status. It later became an extratropical cyclone by the next day.

=== Severe Tropical Cyclone Kevin ===
- Category 5 severe tropical cyclone (Australian scale)
- Category 4 tropical cyclone (SSHWS)
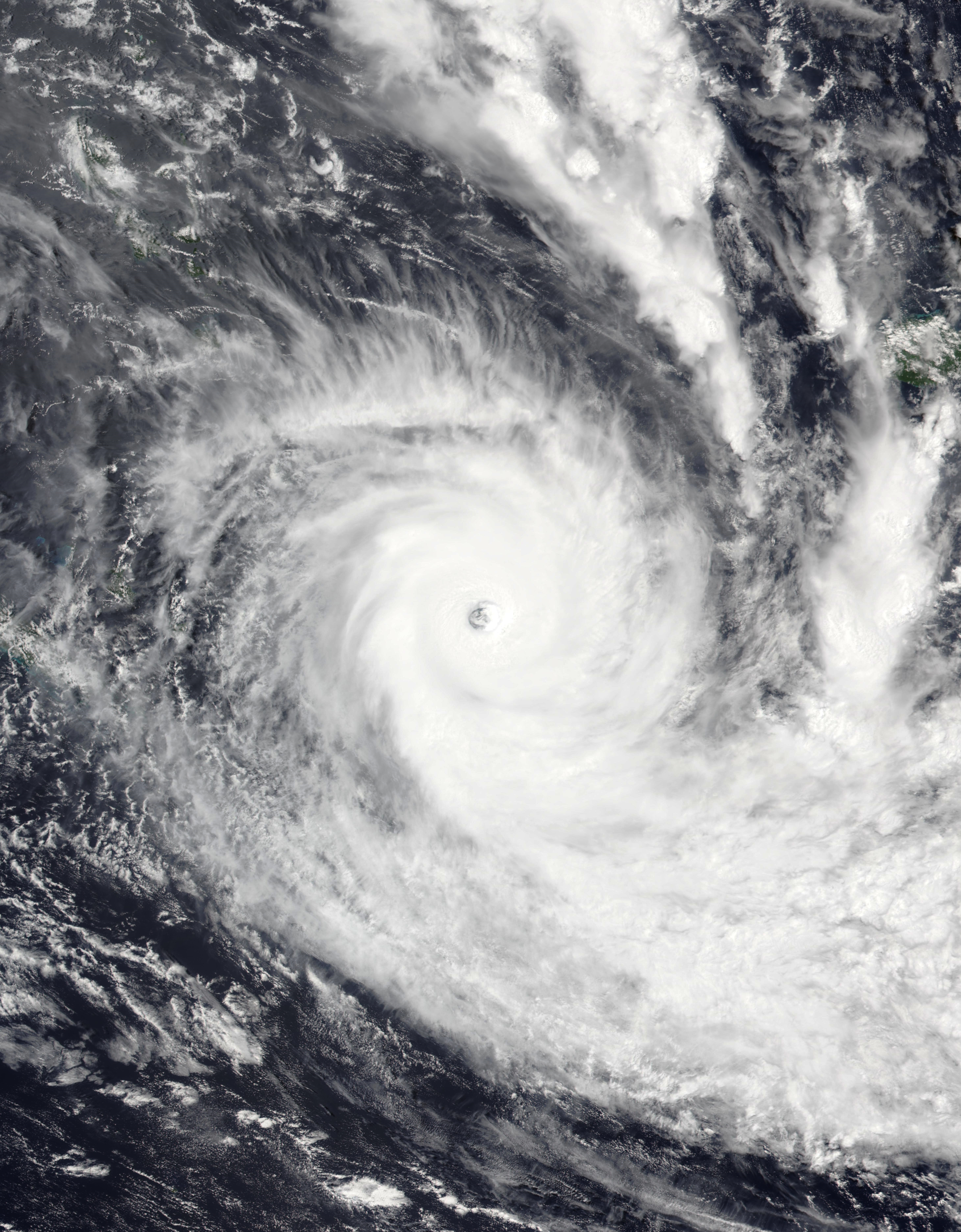
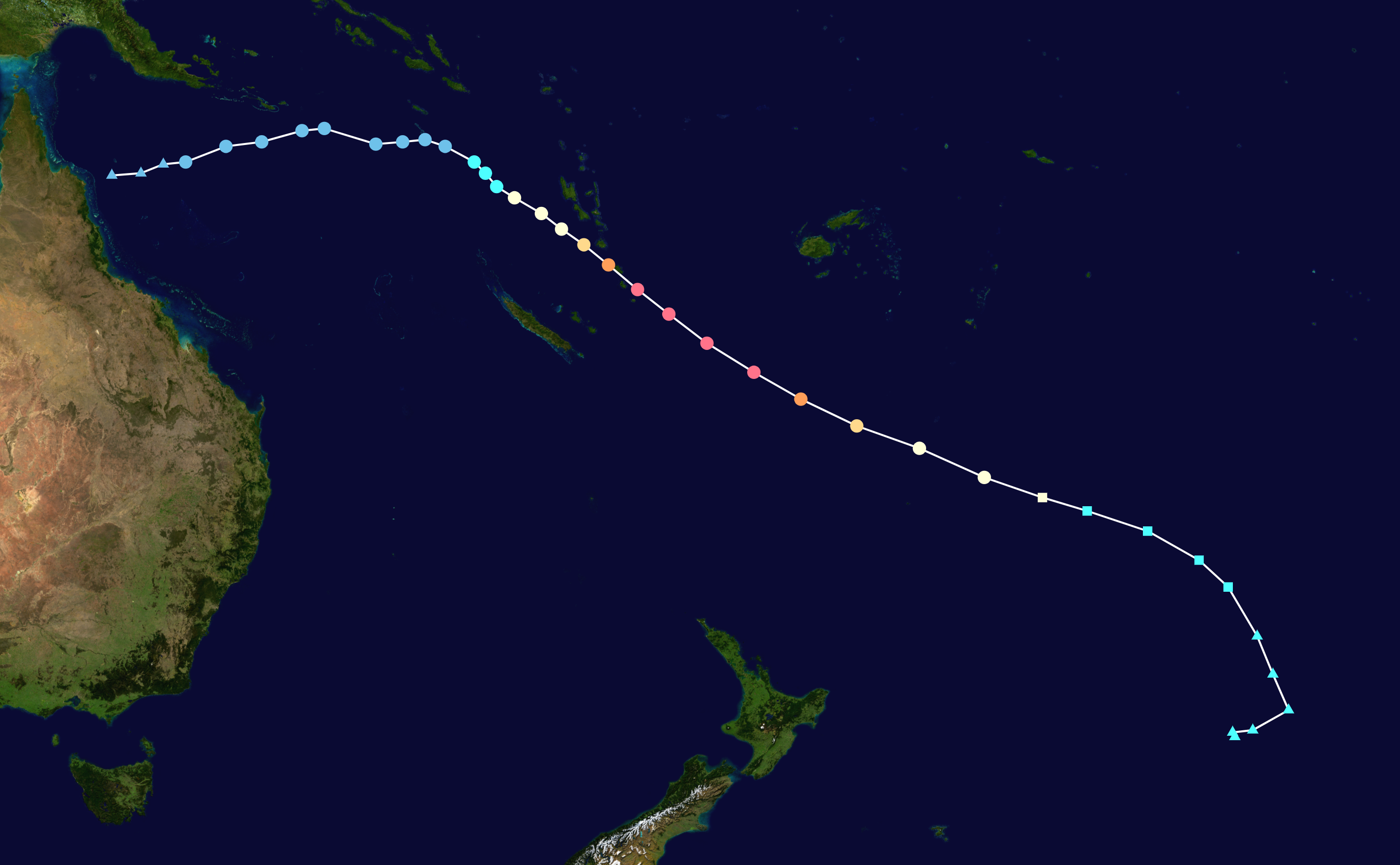
- Duration: March 1 (Entered basin) – March 6
- Peak intensity: 230 km/h (145 mph) (10-min); 913 hPa (mbar)

Tropical Low 18U entered the basin on March 1 where it became designated as Tropical Depression 09F by the FMS. The JTWC classified it as a Tropical Storm, initiating advisories as Tropical Cyclone 16P. The system was assigned the name Kevin by the FMS as it strengthened into a Category 1 tropical cyclone on the Australian scale. It later intensified to a Category 2 as it headed southeastward. On March 3, it became a Category 3 severe tropical cyclone on the Australian scale and a Category 1-equivalent tropical cyclone on the SSHWS. It rapidly intensified to a Category 5 tropical cyclone on both the Australian scale and the SSHWS on March 4. It began to steadily weaken as it headed southeastward, entering the area of responsibility of the MetService. It eventually became extratropical on March 6.

A heavy rain alert was issued for the Northern parts of Lautoka and Ba area, interior of Ba and Nadroga-Navosa, Sigatoka, and Kadavu.

=== Tropical Depression 10F ===
- Tropical depression (Australian scale)
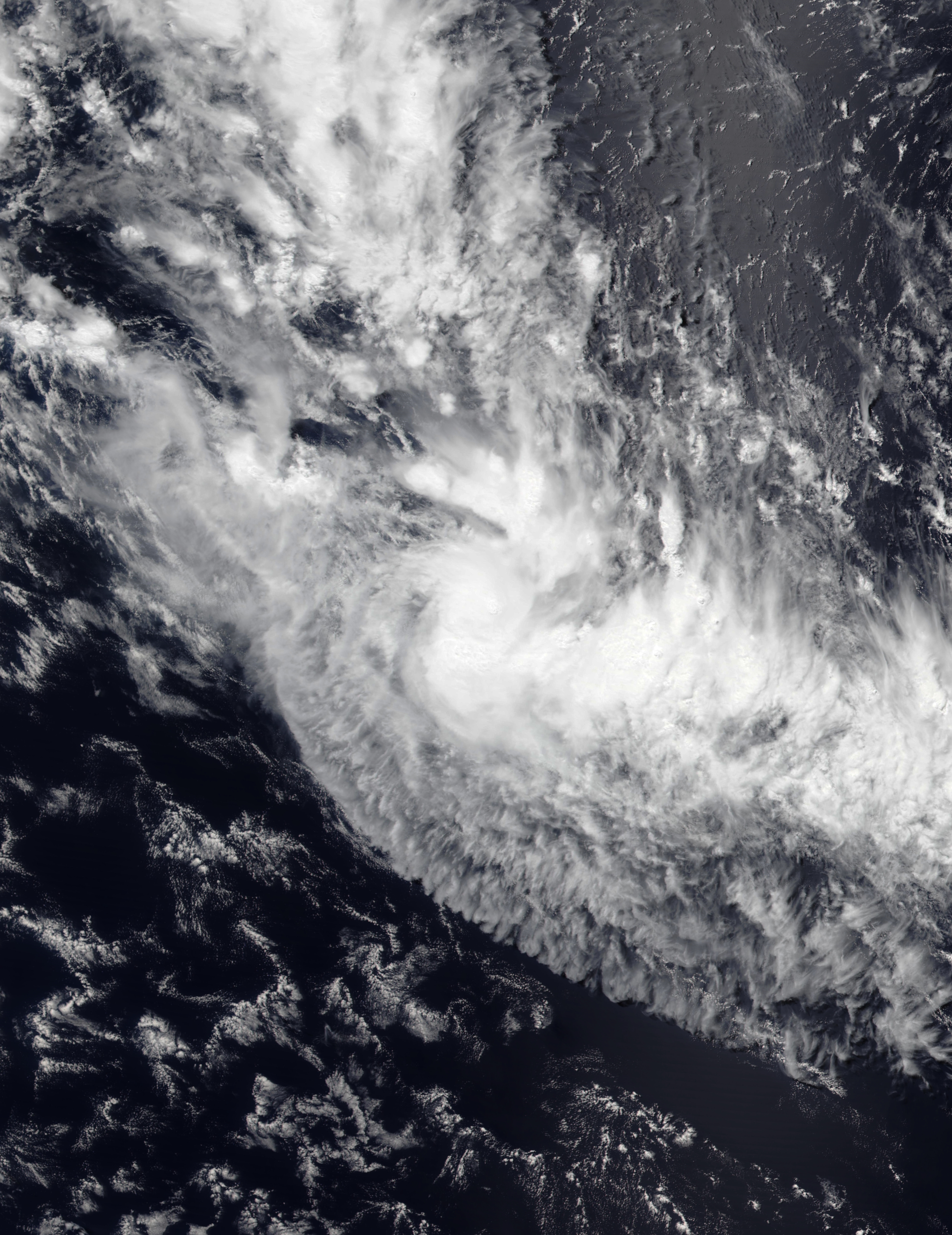
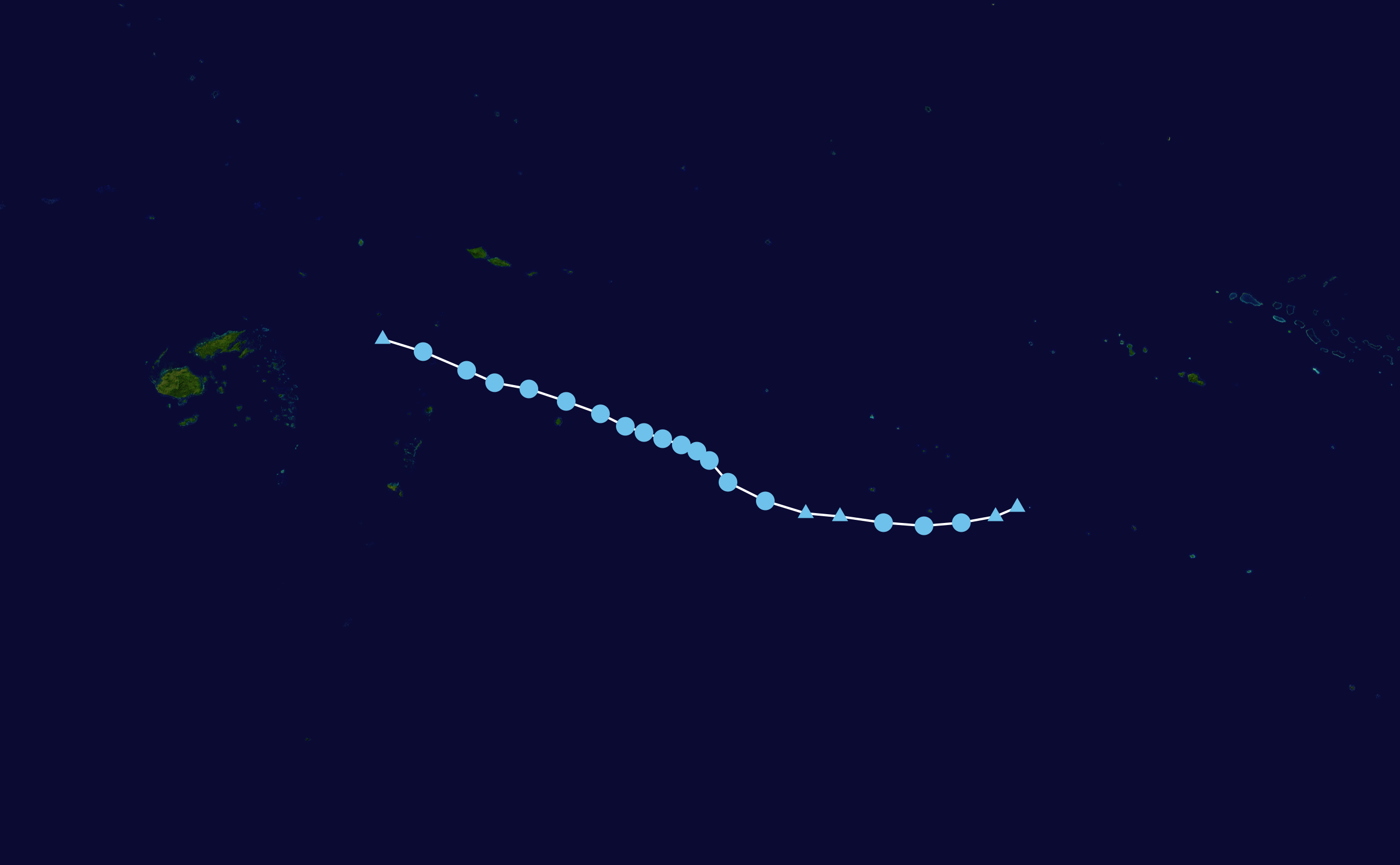
- Duration: March 8 – March 13
- Peak intensity: 55 km/h (35 mph) (10-min); 1006 hPa (mbar)

Late on March 8, the FMS reported that Tropical Disturbance 10F formed near Niue, and gave the system a low chance for development. The JTWC began tracking the disturbance by the next day, and also gave it a low chance of formation. Under an environment of warm sea surface temperatures, low to moderate wind shear, and excellent upper-level outflow, the system rapidly developed, prompting the JTWC to issue a TCFA late on the same day. By the next day, the FMS upgraded its formation chance to moderate. However, the system's low-level circulation became elongated and weakly defined, with its convection being sheared to the east, prompting the JTWC to cancel its TCFA late on March 11. The FMS continued to track 10F until it was last noted two days later, to the southwest of Papeete, French Polynesia.

=== Tropical Depression 11F ===
- Tropical depression (Australian scale)
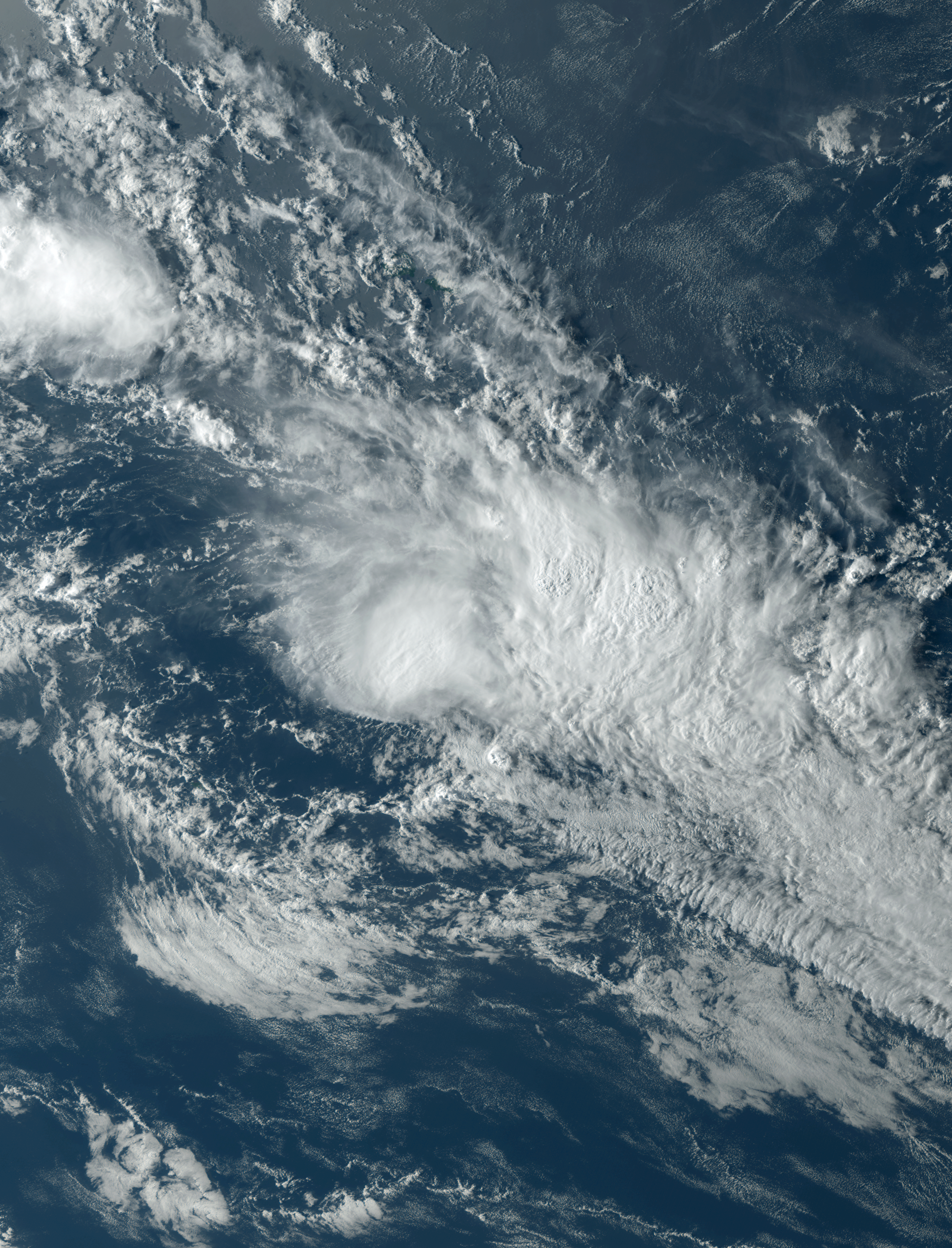
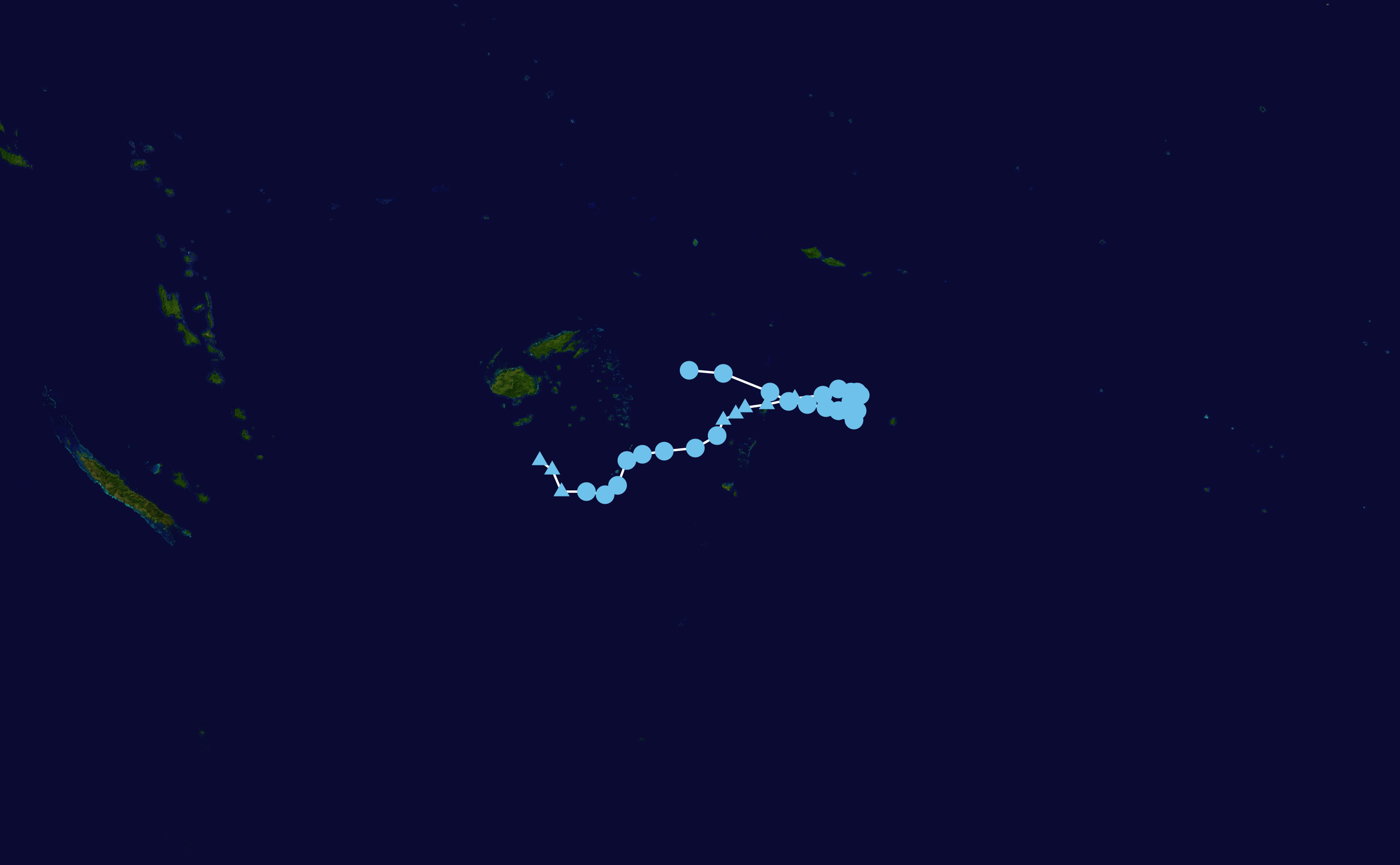
- Duration: March 11 – March 23
- Peak intensity: 55 km/h (35 mph) (10-min); 1006 hPa (mbar)

On March 11, the FMS reported that Tropical Disturbance 11F had developed, within an environment of warm sea surface temperatures, low wind shear and moderate upper divergence, to the west of Tonga. The agency gave the system a moderate chance to develop further. The JTWC, meanwhile, had issued a TCFA on March 13. However, a day later the agency canceled the TCFA, due to the system entering unfavorable environment. The FMS, meanwhile, downgraded the system's chance for development to low, for the same reason. The JTWC reissued its TCFC and reupgraded the chance of the system becoming a cyclone to high. Under high vertical wind shear, the JTWC canceled the TCFA again and redowngraded its chance of the system becoming a cyclone to low.

=== Tropical Disturbance 12F ===
- Tropical disturbance (Australian scale)
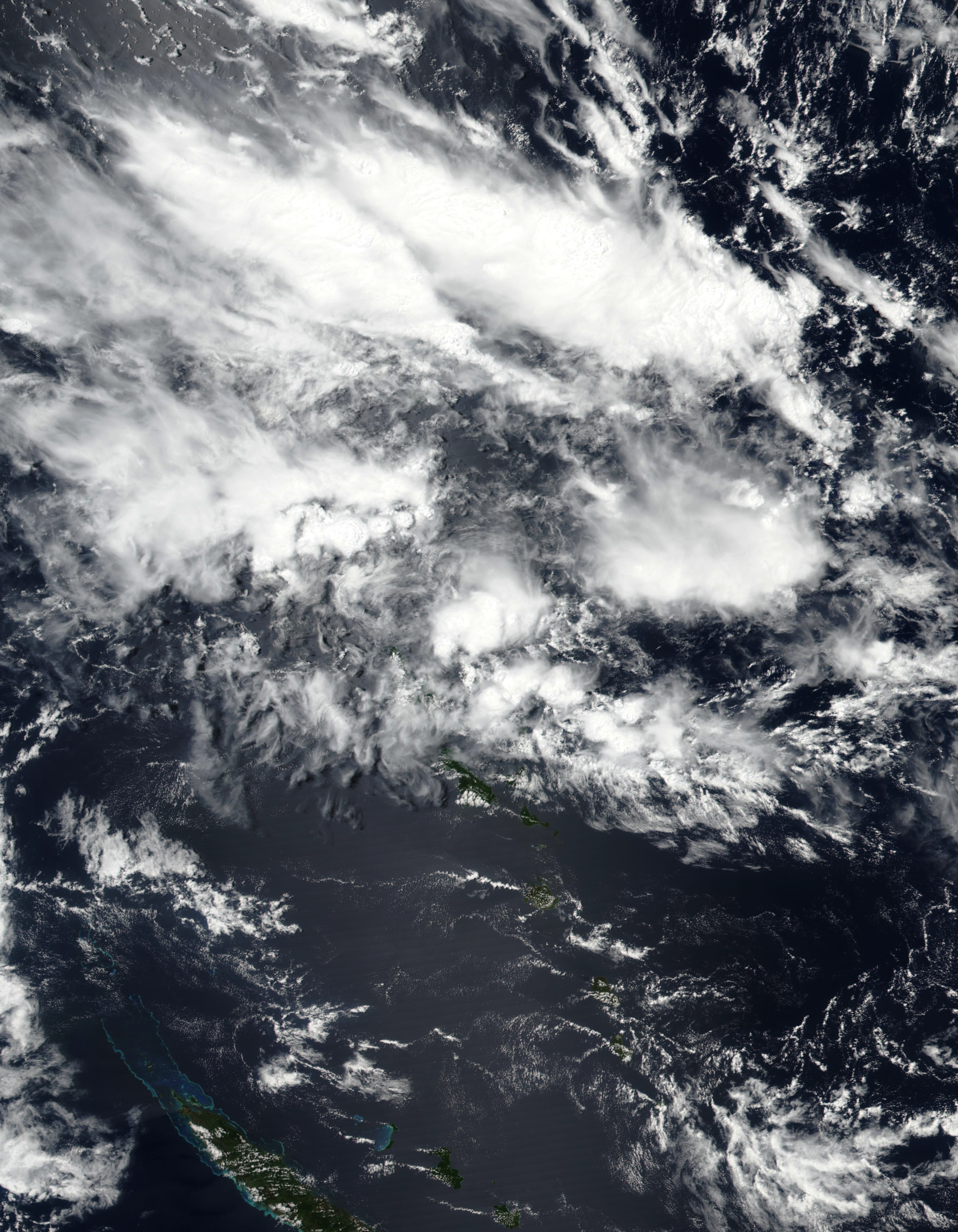
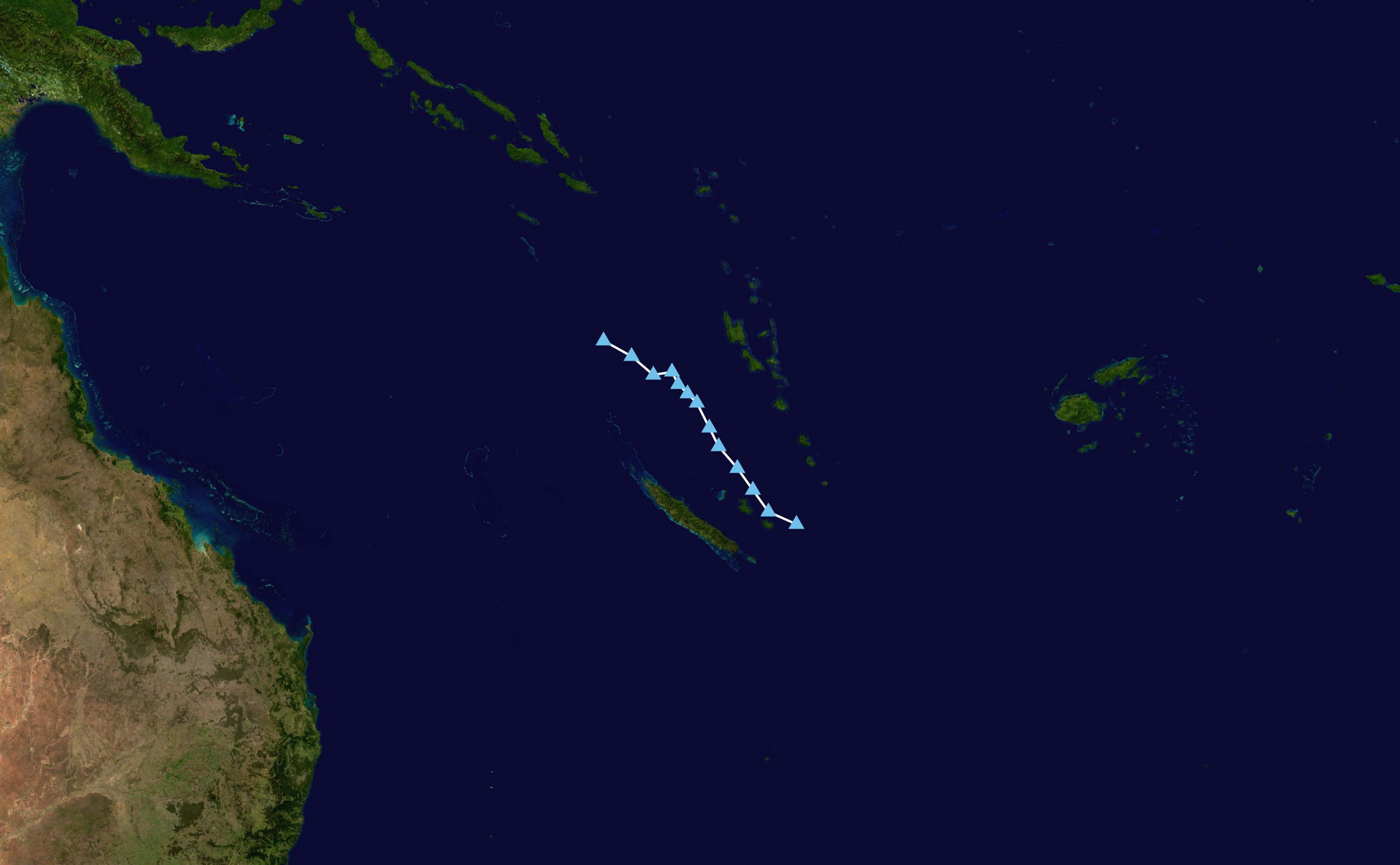
- Duration: March 11 – March 21
- Peak intensity: 45 km/h (30 mph) (10-min); 1005 hPa (mbar)

Late on March 11, the FMS reported that Tropical Disturbance 12F had developed, within an environment of warm sea surface temperatures, low wind shear and good upper divergence, to the northeast of Vanuatu. The JTWC was also monitoring the disturbance, by the identifier code Invest 90P. They gave the system's chance for development as low, however on March 16, stopped tracking the system due to the system's convective activity reportedly dissipating.

=== Tropical Disturbance 13F ===
- Tropical disturbance (Australian scale)
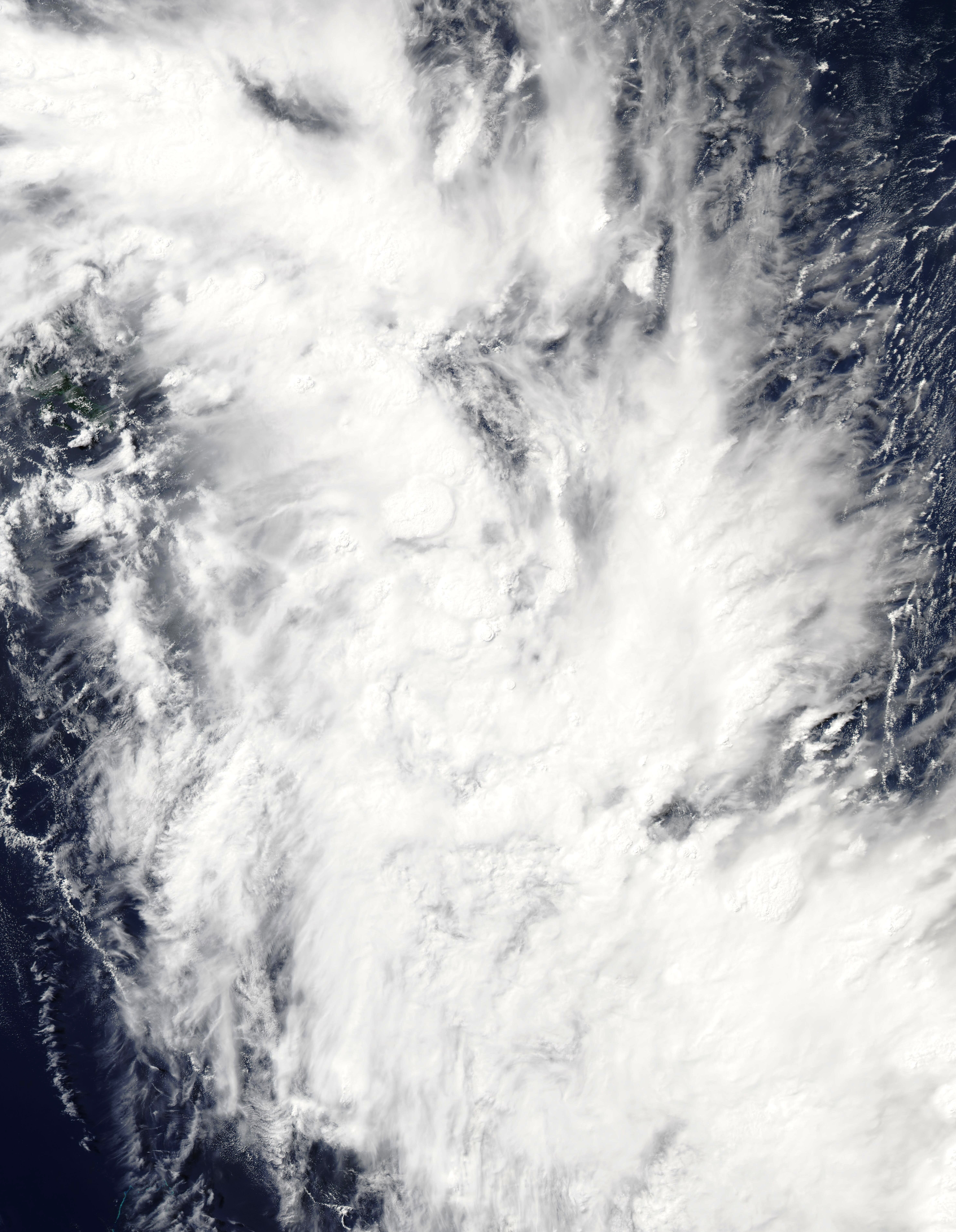
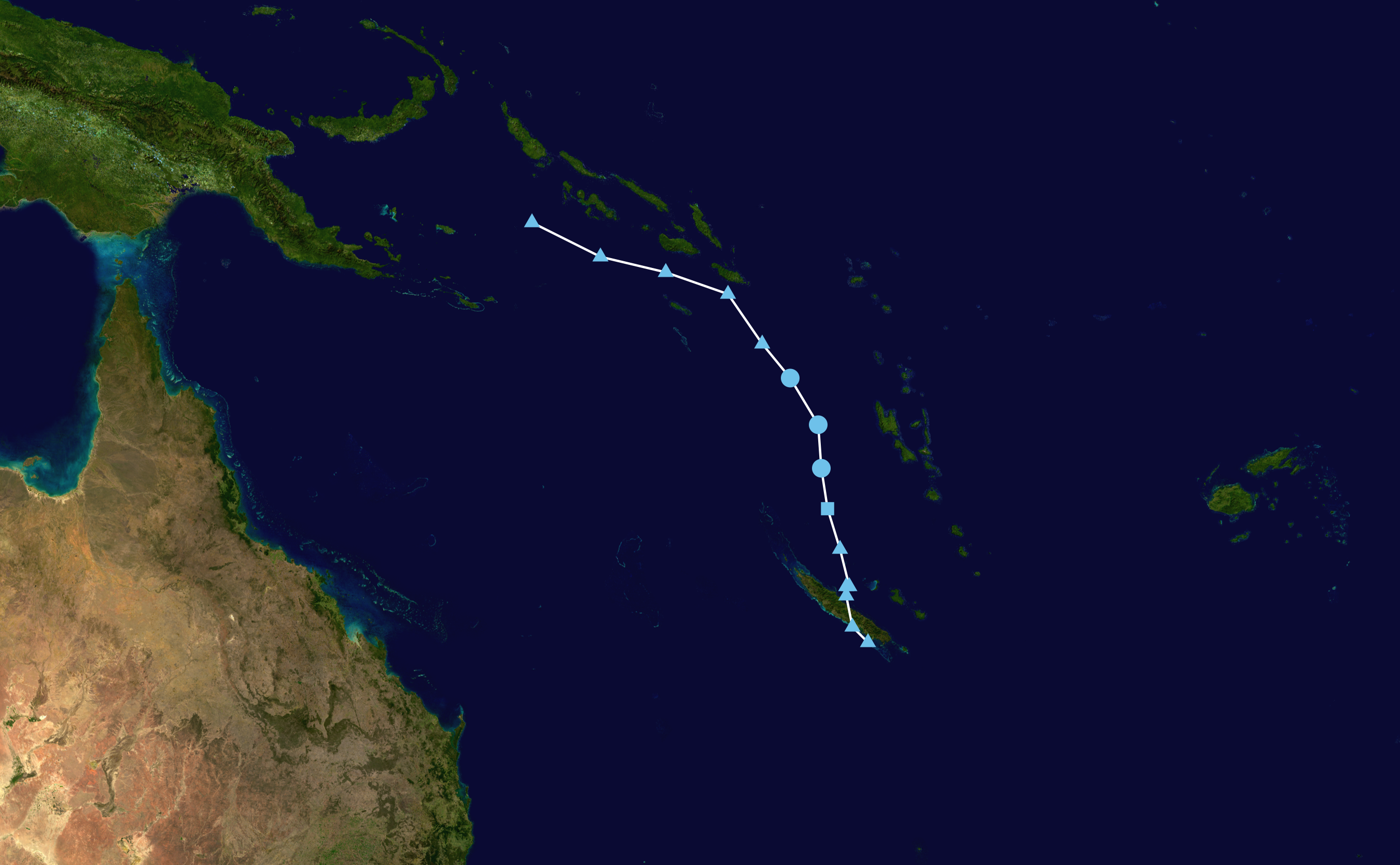
- Duration: April 15 – April 18
- Peak intensity: 45 km/h (30 mph) (10-min); 999 hPa (mbar)

On April 15, the FMS reported that Tropical Disturbance 13F had developed about 630 km (390 mi) to the northwest of Port Vila in Vanuatu. The disturbance was monitored as Invest 99P by the JTWC. The system was poorly organized and showed no signs of intensification. The JTWC later reported that the system transitioned into a subtropical depression as it headed into unfavorable conditions. The disturbance was last noted on April 18.

=== Other system ===
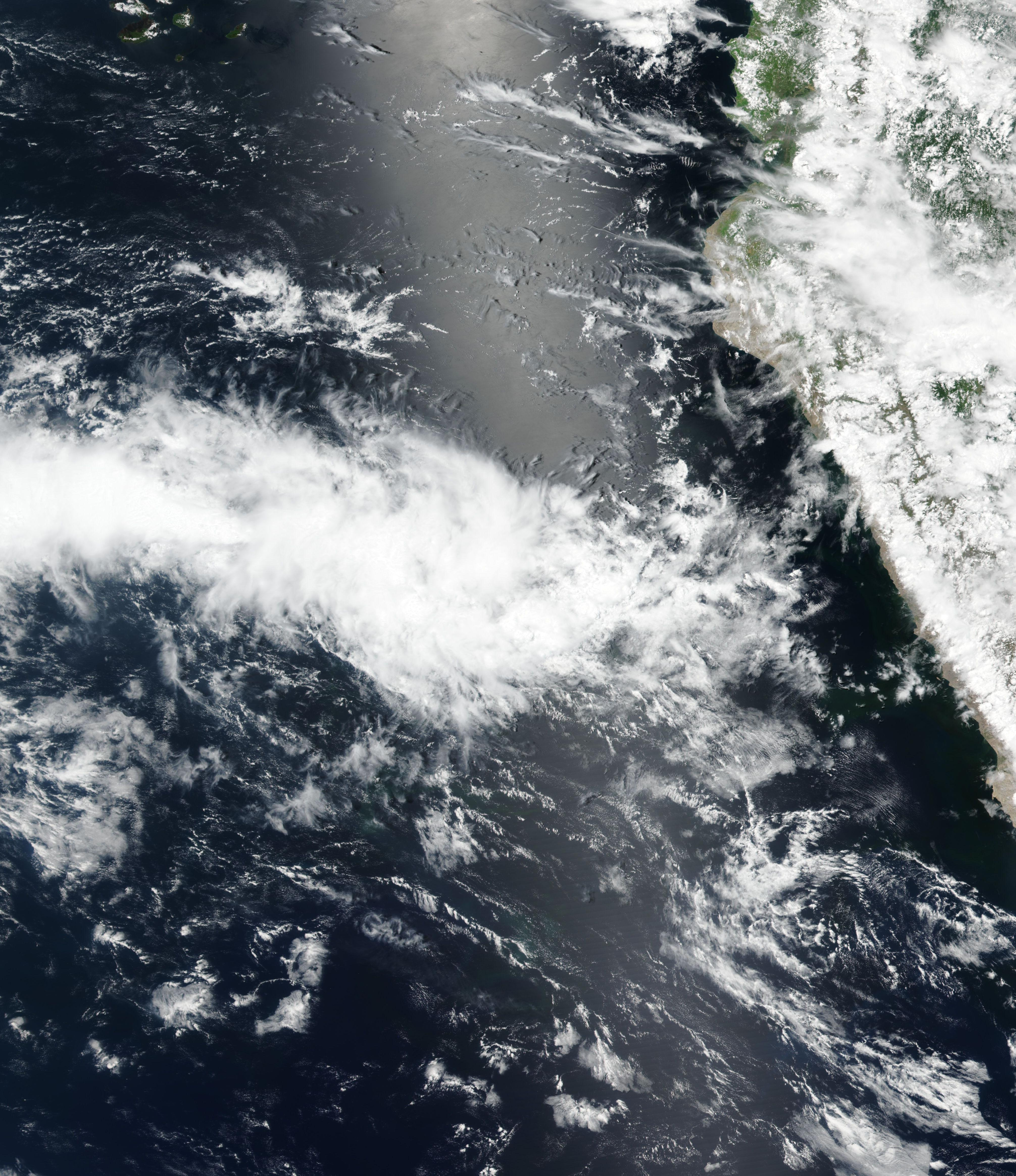
Cyclone Yaku on March 13, 2023

On March 7, SENAMHI reported an "unorganized tropical cyclone". SENAMHI researchers were able to identify the formation of the cyclone at the end of February, and also stated that the unusual phenomenon would remain in the Peruvian sea but would not affect any cities on the Peruvian and Ecuadorian coasts. They also reported that moderate to heavy rainfall would develop on the northern coast and highlands of Peru from March 9 to March 11. and that the cyclone would not become a hurricane. The system was named "Cyclone Yaku", with the word "Yaku" coming from the Quechuan translation of "water".

On March 10, the National Institute of Meteorology and Hydrology (INAMHI) in Ecuador reported that Yaku was moving away from Ecuador and would no longer have a direct impact on the country. In Peru, it was predicted that precipitation from the event would last through mid-March while precipitation from warm sea temperatures would occur into April.

== Storm names ==
Within the Southern Pacific, a tropical depression is judged to have reached tropical cyclone intensity should it reach winds of 65 km/h (40 mph) and it is evident that gales are occurring at least halfway around the center. With tropical depressions intensifying into a tropical cyclone between the Equator and 25°S and between 160°E – 120°W named by the FMS. However should a tropical depression intensify to the south of 25°S between 160°E and 120°W it will be named in conjunction with the FMS by MetService. The names Hale, Irene and Kevin were used for the first time (and the only time for Kevin) this season, as they replaced Heta and Ivy from 2003–04 season, and Kerry from the 2004–05 seasons respectively. Should a tropical cyclone move out of the basin and into the Australian region it will retain its original name.

The names that were used for 2022–23 season are listed below:

- Hale
- Irene
- Judy
- Kevin

If a tropical cyclone enters the South Pacific basin from the Australian region basin (west of 160°E), it will retain the name assigned to it by the BoM. The following storms were named in this manner:

- Gabrielle

=== Retirement ===
After the season, the names Judy and Kevin were retired due to the damages they caused, and were replaced with Josese and Kirio. Though not being named in the basin, Gabrielle was also retired from the Australian region lists, and replaced with Gemm.

== Season effects ==
This table lists all the storms that developed in the South Pacific to the east of longitude 160°E during the 2022–23 season. It includes their intensity on the Australian tropical cyclone intensity scale, duration, name, landfalls, deaths, and damages. All data is taken from RSMC Nadi and/or TCWC Wellington, and all of the damage figures are in 2022 or 2023 USD.

Name	Dates	Peak intensity			Areas affected	Damage (USD)	Deaths	Ref(s).
Name	Dates	Category	Wind speed	Pressure	Areas affected	Damage (USD)	Deaths	Ref(s).
01F	December 10 – 12	Tropical disturbance	45 km/h (30 mph)	1005 hPa (29.68 inHg)	Fiji	None	None	
02F	December 29 – 31	Tropical disturbance	45 km/h (30 mph)	999 hPa (29.50 inHg)	New Caledonia	None	None	
03F	January 5 – 7	Tropical disturbance	45 km/h (30 mph)	1000 hPa (29.53 inHg)	New Caledonia	None	None	
Hale	January 7 – 8	Tropical depression	55 km/h (35 mph)	994 hPa (29.35 inHg)	New Caledonia, New Zealand	Unknown	0 (1)	
Irene	January 14 – 19	Category 2 tropical cyclone	100 km/h (65 mph)	980 hPa (28.94 inHg)	New Caledonia, Vanuatu	Unknown	None	
06F	January 20 – 22	Tropical depression	55 km/h (35 mph)	996 hPa (29.41 inHg)	New Caledonia, New Zealand	$1.43 billion	4	
Gabrielle	February 10 – 11	Category 3 severe tropical cyclone	150 km/h (90 mph)	958 hPa (28.29 inHg)	Norfolk Island, New Zealand	$9.2 billion	11 (4)	
Judy	February 23 – March 4	Category 4 severe tropical cyclone	185 km/h (115 mph)	940 hPa (27.76 inHg)	Vanuatu	Unknown	None	
Kevin	March 1 – 6	Category 5 severe tropical cyclone	230 km/h (145 mph)	913 hPa (26.96 inHg)	Solomon Islands, Vanuatu	$433 million	None	
10F	March 8 – 13	Tropical depression	55 km/h (35 mph)	1006 hPa (29.71 inHg)	Niue	None	None	
11F	March 11 – 23	Tropical depression	55 km/h (35 mph)	1006 hPa (29.71 inHg)	Tonga, Niue	None	None	
12F	March 11 – 21	Tropical disturbance	45 km/h (30 mph)	1005 hPa (29.68 inHg)	New Caledonia	None	None	
13F	April 15 – 18	Tropical disturbance	45 km/h (30 mph)	999 hPa (29.50 inHg)	None	None	None	
Season aggregates
13 systems	December 10, 2022 – April 18, 2023		230 km/h (145 mph)	913 hPa (26.96 inHg)		$11.1 billion	15 (5)	

== See also ==
- Weather of 2022 and 2023
- List of Southern Hemisphere cyclone seasons
- Tropical cyclones in 2022 and 2023
- Atlantic hurricane seasons: 2022, 2023
- Pacific hurricane seasons: 2022, 2023
- Pacific typhoon seasons: 2022, 2023
- North Indian Ocean cyclone seasons: 2022, 2023
- 2022–23 South-West Indian Ocean cyclone season
- 2022–23 Australian region cyclone season
