= 60th parallel north =

Circle of latitude in the Northern Hemisphere

60th parallel north (interactive map)

The 60th parallel north is a circle of latitude that is 60 degrees north of Earth's equator. It crosses Europe, Asia, the Pacific Ocean, North America, and the Atlantic Ocean.

Although it lies approximately twice as far away from the Equator as from the North Pole, the 60th parallel is half as long as the Equator line, due to the cosine of 60 degrees being 0.5. That is, a point on Earth’s surface at this latitude is half as far from the rotational axis as a point on the Equator is.

At this latitude, the Sun is visible for 18 hours, 7 minutes during the June solstice and 5 hours, 52 minutes during the December solstice. The maximum altitude of the Sun is 53.44° on 21 June and 6.56° on 21 December. The maximum altitude of the Sun is > 15.00º in October and > 8.00º in November.

The lowest latitude where white nights can be observed is approximately on this parallel. White nights in the 60th parallel north occur around the June Solstice (Summer Solstice in the Northern Hemisphere).

During the summer solstice, nighttime does not get beyond nautical twilight, a condition which lasts throughout the month of June. It is possible to view both astronomical dawn and dusk every day between August 22 and April 21.

== Around the world ==
Malachy Tallack wrote a book, Sixty Degrees North: Around the World in Search of Home, about his travels along the general line of the parallel, starting and finishing at Shetland.

Starting at the Prime Meridian and heading eastwards, the parallel 60° north passes through:

Coordinates	Country, territory or ocean	Notes
60°0′N 0°0′E	Atlantic Ocean	North Sea
60°0′N 5°3′E	Norway	Islands of Stolmen and Selbjørn, Hordaland
60°0′N 5°12′E	Atlantic Ocean	Bekkjarviksundet, Selbjørnsfjorden, North Sea
60°0′N 5°15′E	Norway	Island of Huftarøy, Hordaland
60°0′N 5°17′E	Atlantic Ocean	Langenuen, North Sea
60°0′N 5°22′E	Norway	Islands of Reksteren, Tysnesøy and the mainland Hordaland
60°0′N 5°52′E	Atlantic Ocean	Hardangerfjorden, North Sea
60°0′N 5°59′E	Norway	Mainland: Folgefonna glacier, Telemark, Buskerud, Akershus, Oslo, Hedmark, Østfold; Passing just north of the capital Oslo
60°0′N 12°23′E	Sweden	Passing through Fagersta; Passing just north of Uppsala
60°0′N 18°53′E	Atlantic Ocean	Baltic Sea
60°0′N 20°8′E	Finland	Högskär, Bäckö and several smaller islands, Åland Islands
60°0′N 20°58′E	Atlantic Ocean	Baltic Sea
60°0′N 23°30′E	Finland	Passing through Ekenäs
60°0′N 23°58′E	Atlantic Ocean	Baltic Sea
60°0′N 24°26′E	Finland	Porkkala peninsula
60°0′N 24°30′E	Atlantic Ocean	Baltic Sea, Gulf of Finland; Passing just south of Helsinki, Finland and the island of Gogland, Russia
60°0′N 27°48′E	Russia	Moshchny Island
60°0′N 27°54′E	Atlantic Ocean	Gulf of Finland, Baltic Sea
60°0′N 29°44′E	Russia	Island of Kotlin (city of Kronstadt)
60°0′N 29°47′E	Atlantic Ocean	Gulf of Finland, Baltic Sea
60°0′N 30°5′E	Russia	Passing through Saint Petersburg, Lake Ladoga
60°0′N 154°30′E	Pacific Ocean	Shelikhov Gulf, Sea of Okhotsk
60°0′N 161°28′E	Russia	Kamchatka Peninsula
60°0′N 165°14′E	Pacific Ocean	Bering Sea
60°0′N 166°10′E	Russia	Pylgin Range
60°0′N 166°33′E	Pacific Ocean	Olyutor Gulf, Bering Sea
60°0′N 170°9′E	Russia	Olyutor Peninsula
60°0′N 170°26′E	Pacific Ocean	Bering Sea
60°0′N 167°8′W	United States	Alaska - Nunivak Island
60°0′N 165°39′W	Pacific Ocean	Etolin Strait, Bering Sea
60°0′N 164°9′W	United States	Alaska
60°0′N 152°38′W	Pacific Ocean	Cook Inlet, Gulf of Alaska
60°0′N 151°44′W	United States	Alaska - Kenai Peninsula, Evans Island, Elrington Island, Latouche Island and Montague Island
60°0′N 147°24′W	Pacific Ocean	Gulf of Alaska
60°0′N 144°24′W	United States	Alaska - Wingham Island, Kayak Island and a small section of mainland
60°0′N 143°50′W	Pacific Ocean	Gulf of Alaska
60°0′N 141°53′W	United States	Alaska
60°0′N 139°3′W	Canada	Yukon / British Columbia border Northwest Territories / British Columbia border Northwest Territories / Alberta border - passes through Wood Buffalo National Park and beside Fort Smith, NT; Northwest Territories / Saskatchewan border Nunavut / Manitoba border
60°0′N 94°49′W	Arctic Ocean	Hudson Bay; Passing just north of the Ottawa Islands, Nunavut, Canada
60°0′N 77°17′W	Canada	Quebec; Passing just south of Puvirnituq, Quebec
60°0′N 69°46′W	Arctic Ocean	Ungava Bay; Passing just south of Kangirsuk, Quebec, Canada
60°0′N 65°7′W	Canada	Quebec, Newfoundland and Labrador
60°0′N 64°9′W	Atlantic Ocean	Border between the Davis Strait (to the north) and the Labrador Sea (to the south)
60°0′N 44°52′W	Greenland	Passing south of Narsaq; crossing mainland at Narsarmijit; going through Cape Farewell Archipelago, passing just north of Itilleq Island
60°0′N 43°9′W	Atlantic Ocean	
60°0′N 1°21′W	United Kingdom	Islands of Mainland and Mousa, Shetland Islands, Scotland
60°0′N 1°11′W	Atlantic Ocean	North Sea

== Notable cities and towns on 60°N ==
- Whitehorse, Yukon, Canada
- Fort Smith, Northwest Territories, Canada
- Bergen, Vestland, Norway
- Oslo, Norway
- Helsinki, Uusimaa, Finland
- Espoo, Uusimaa, Finland
- Saint Petersburg, Russia
- Lerwick, Scotland, UK
- Uppsala, Sweden

== Canada ==
The 60th parallel north in Canada, marking the southern borders of Yukon, Northwest Territories, and the Nunavut mainland.

In Canada, the 60th parallel forms the southern mainland boundary of the northern territories of Yukon, Northwest Territories, and Nunavut with the western provinces of British Columbia, Alberta, Saskatchewan, and Manitoba.

Accordingly, "north of 60" is an expression often used for the territories, although parts of Nunavut (the islands in Hudson Bay and James Bay) are located south of the 60th parallel, and parts of Quebec and Newfoundland and Labrador are located north, to the east of Hudson Bay. A 1990s TV show on CBC about life in the Northwest Territories was called North of 60.

The 60th Parallel Territorial Park is on Mackenzie Highway between Alberta and Northwest Territories and it has a visitor centre there in the homeland of the Yellowknives Dene First Nation and the North Slave Métis Alliance.

Canada's only four corners are located at the intersection of the 60th parallel and the 102nd meridian west, between the Northwest Territories, Nunavut, Saskatchewan, and Manitoba.

== Greenland ==
Between 1776 and 1950, the 60th parallel formed the southern limit of the Royal Greenland Trade Department's exclusive monopoly on trade near the Dano-Norwegian and later Danish colonies of Greenland (1776–1782) and South Greenland (1782–1950).

== See also ==
- 59th parallel north
- 61st parallel north
