= Olyutorsky =

Olyutorsky may refer to:

- Olyutorsky District
- Olyutor Gulf (Olyutorsky Zaliv)
- Olyutor Peninsula
- Olyutor Range (Olyutorsky Khrebet)
- Cape Olyutor (Mys Olyutorsky)

== See also ==
- Alyutor
