= Alyutor language =

Chukotkan language of Kamchatka, Russia

Alyutor
- алуталг’у alutalg'u
- Native to: Russia
- Region: Kamchatka
- Ethnicity: Alyutors
- Native speakers: 172 (2021 census)
- Language family: Chukotko-Kamchatkan: Chukotkan; Alyutor
- Dialects: Alutor; Palana Koryak; Karagin Koryak †?
- Writing system: Cyrillic script

Language codes
- ISO 639-3: alr
- Glottolog: alut1245
- ELP: Alutor
- Pre-contact distribution of Alyutor (light purple) and other Chukotko-Kamchatkan languages

- Alutor is classified as Severely Endangered by the UNESCO Atlas of the World's Languages in Danger.

Alyutor (also called Alutor, Aliutor or Olyutor) is a severely endangered language of Russia that belongs to the Chukotkan branch of the Chukotko-Kamchatkan languages, by the Alyutors. It is spoken by 172 speakers in the 2021 Russian census.

== Sociolinguistic situation ==
The Alutor are the indigenous inhabitants of the northern part of the Kamchatka Peninsula. The language is unwritten and moribund; in the 1970s residents of the chief Alutor village of Vyvenka under the age of 25 did not know the language. In recent years, the Vyvenka village school has started teaching the language. Until 1958, the language was considered the "village" (settled) dialect of the Koryak language, but it is not intelligible with traditionally nomadic varieties of Koryak. The autonym [ˈnəməlʔən] (also Нәмәлъу) means "villager" or "settled person".

== Phonology ==
=== Vowels ===
Alyutor has six vowels, five of which may be long or short. The schwa /ə/ cannot be long.

	Front	Central	Back
Close	i iː		u uː
Mid	e eː	ə	o oː
Open		a aː	

=== Consonants ===
There are 18 consonants in Alyutor.

	Labial	Alveolar		Palatal	Velar	Uvular	Pharyngeal	Glottal
	Labial	plain	palatalized	Palatal	Velar	Uvular	Pharyngeal	Glottal
Nasal	m	n	nʲ		ŋ			
Plosive	p	t			k	q		ʔ
Fricative	v	s			ɣ		ʕ	
Approximant	w	l	lʲ	j				
Trill		r						

=== Stress ===
Stress generally falls on the second syllable of polysyllabic words, and on the first syllable of disyllabic words, e.g.:

- /ˈmi.məl/ 'water', /ˈɣəl.ɣən/ 'skin', /ˈta.wə.ja.tək/ 'to feed', /qə.ˈla.vul/ 'husband', /pə.ˈla.kəl.ŋən/ 'mukluk'.

An open syllable containing schwa cannot be stressed. As a consequence, if a disyllabic term begins with such a syllable, the stress is shifted to the last syllable and thereafter a new, epenthetic syllable is added at the end, e.g.:

- */ˈmə.tan/ -> /məˈtan.nə/ 'mosquito'.

The final syllable of a word is never stressed.

=== Syllable structure ===
All Alyutor syllables begin with a single consonant. If the vowel is short, including a schwa, they may also close with a single consonant. Consonant clusters are not permitted in the word initial or word final positions. The schwa is used to break up disallowed clusters.

Examples are /ˈvi.tak/ 'to work', /ˈtil.mə.til/ 'eagle', /ˈʔitʔən/ 'parka'.

Alyutor word boundaries always coincide with syllable boundaries.

== Orthography ==
The Alyutor language does not have a standard orthography.

== Typology ==
Alutor is a polysynthetic language.

ɣəmmə t-ə-plak+tavamjat-ə-tkən
I.ABS 1SG.S-E-boot+crumple-E-IMPERF
'I soften boots '

The morphology is agglutinative, with extensive prefixes and suffixes.

qəlʲippə tətu-kki ɣeqə⟩masla⟨ta n-ə-mal-qin.
bread+NOM+SG eat.with.something-CVB ASSOC⟩butter⟨ASSOC good
'Bread (eaten) with butter is excellent.'

The argument structure is ergative.

ən-an(nə) ɣəmmə ina-ɣal-i.
he-ERG me+ABS 1SG.P-walk.past-3SG.A
'He walked past me.'

The word order is variable, and it is difficult to say which typology is basic. The verb-absolutive orders AVO and VAO are perhaps most common.

tita·qa qutkinʲnʲaqu-nak maŋ.ki·ʔana ɣa⟩laʔu⟨lin ʔənnə-ʔən.
once (name)-ERG+SG somewhere RES⟩see⟨RES+3SG.P fish-ABS+SG
'Once Qutkinnyaqu saw a fish somewhere.'

ɣa⟩nvə⟨lin qutkinʲnʲaqu-nak təlɣə-lŋən ŋan.tiŋ.
RES⟩poke⟨RES+3SG.P (name)-ERG+SG finger-ABS+SG there
'Qutkinnyaqu stuck his finger there.'

== Morphology ==
Alyutor has the following parts of speech: nouns, adjectives, numerals, pronouns, verbs, participles, adverbs, postpositions, conjunctions, and particles.

=== Nouns ===
Nouns are inflected for number, case, definiteness, and grammatical person.

There are three grammatical numbers: singular, dual and plural.

There are eleven cases: absolutive, ergative, locative, dative, lative, prolative, contractive, causative, equative, comitative, and associative.

Number and case are expressed using a single affix. A suffix is used for all cases except the comitative and associative, which are expressed using circumfixes. There are two declensions, taught as three noun classes. The first class are nonhuman nouns of the first declension. Number is only distinguished in the absolutive case, though verbal agreement may distinguish number when these nouns are in the ergative. The second class are proper names and kin terms for elders. They are second declension, and distinguish number in the ergative, locative, and lative cases, as well as the absolutive. The third class are the other human nouns; they may be either first or second declension.

	1st declension			2nd declension		
	singular	dual	plural	singular	dual	plural
absolutive	(stem)	-t/-ti	-w/-wwi	(stem)	-nti	-w/-wwi
ergative	-a/-ta			-ənak	-ətək	
locative	-k/-ki			-ənak	-ətək	
dative	-ŋ			-ənaŋ	-ətək	
lative	-kəŋ			—		
prolative	-jpəŋ/-ɣəpəŋ (-e ~ -i)					
contactive	-jit ~ -jita					
causative	-kjit ~ -kjita					
equative	-u/-nu			-u/-ənu		
comitative	ɣa⟩…⟨a/-ta			awən⟩…⟨ma		
associative	ɣeqə⟩…⟨a/-ta			—		

==== Case roles ====
- The absolutive case is the citation form of a noun. It is used for the argument ("subject") of an intransitive clause and the object of a transitive clause, for "syntactic possessives", and for the vocative.
- The ergative is used for the agent ("subject") of a transitive verb, as an instrumental case, and as the argument of an antipassive clause.
- The locative is used for position and direction (essive and lative cases), as well as arguments which are "driven away", e.g.:

ənnu ɣilŋatə-tkən ujatiki-k.
he-ABS.SG drive-IMPERF sledge-LOC
'he drove away the sledge.'

- The dative is used for recipients, benefactors, directional objects (allative case), and subjects of experiential verbs
- Lative is used for motion toward a goal
- Prolative is used for movement along and movement from (perlative and elative cases)
- Equative is used with the meanings 'like X', 'as X', usually with verbs like 'to become', 'to turn into', 'to work as,' etc.
- Contactive is used for objects that make contact
- Causative is used for noun phrases that cause or motivate an action
- Comitative is used for .... It is primarily used with high-animacy referents.
- Associative is used for secondary or passive accompaniment. It is only attested in the declension of nouns of the first declension, usually inanimate.

==== Grammatical person ====
Grammatical first and second person suffixes on nouns are used to equate a noun with participants in the discourse. They only appear in the absolutive, with an intervening j on nouns ending in a vowel and an i on nouns ending in a consonant.

	singular	dual	plural
1st person	-j-ɣəm	-muri	-muru
2nd person	-j-ɣət	-turi	-turu

- ...ʡopta am-ʡujamtawilʔ-ə-muru "yes we the people"
- japlə=q ʡujamtawilʔ-iɣəm "and I'm a man"

=== Numerals ===
Alyutor has simple numerals for the numbers one to five, ten, and twenty. All other numbers are compounds based on these numerals.

Ordinal	English
ənnan	one
ŋitaq	two
ŋəruqqə	three
ŋəraqqə	four
məlləŋin	five
ənnanməlləŋ(in)	six (one-five)
ŋitaqməlləŋ(in)	seven (two-five)
ŋəruqməlləŋ(in)	eight (three-five)
ŋəraqməlləŋ(in)	nine (four-five)
mənɣətkin	ten
mənɣətək ənnan	eleven
qəlikkə	twenty (a score)
qəlikək ənnan	twenty one
ŋəraqmənɣətkin	forty (four tens)
ŋəraqmənɣətkin ŋəraqqə	forty four
ŋitaqməlləŋin mənɣətkin	seventy (seven tens)
mənɣətək mənɣətkin	hundred (ten tens)

=== Verbs ===
There are finite (conjugated) and non-finite verbs. There are several conjugations.

==== Polypersonal conjugation ====
Finite verbs agree in person and number with their nuclear arguments; agreement is through both prefixes and suffixes. Transitive verbs agree with both arguments (ergative and absolutive), whereas intransitive verbs agree with their sole (absolutive) argument.

Verbs distinguish two aspects, perfective, the bare stem, and imperfective, using the suffix -tkə / -tkəni. There are five moods, indicative, imperative, optative, potential (marked by the circumfix ta…(ŋ)), and conjunctive (prefix ʔ-/a-).

==== Monopersonal conjugation ====
Monopersonal verbs include two conjugations, one with the third-person singular in ɣa-...-lin, and the other in n-...-qin.

==== Impersonal conjugation ====
For impersonal forms of conjugation include verbal predicate (formed with the circumfix a...ka) and imperative (formed by circumfix ɣa...a/ta). Non-finite forms Impersonal forms include the verbal predicate with the circumfix a…ka, and the imperative in ɣa…a/ta.

==== Non-finite forms ====
These include the infinitive, supine, gerunds, and participles.

== Sample Text ==
=== Text ===
Амто тийкәтий!

Нәӄасғәваъа юнати Камлэ, нәпуттәӈъа Оммәӄо. Камлэ ӄураӈтаткән, Оммәӄо наӄам ойиткән. Камлэнак нәкита йәг'илғән пәӈлунин, ғатаӄлаӈ әнкәт итәлъу г'уямтав'илъу.

=== Translation ===
Hello sun!

Kamle lived poorly, Omməqo lived richly. Kamle works in the herd, but Omməqo only has one. Kamle asked Luna at night why people live like this.

== Bibliography ==
- Kibrik, A.E., S.V. Kodzasov, I.A. Murav'eva. 2000. Jazyk i fol'klor aljutorcev. Moscow: IMLI RAN Nasledie. ISBN 5-9208-0035-6
- Nagayama, Yukari. 2003. Ocherk grammatiki aljutorskogo jazyka (ELPR Publication Series A2-038). Osaka: Osaka Gakuin University.
