= Korf, Russia =

Selo in Olyutorsky District, Kamchatka Krai, Russia

Korf Корф
- Selo
- Interactive map of Korf
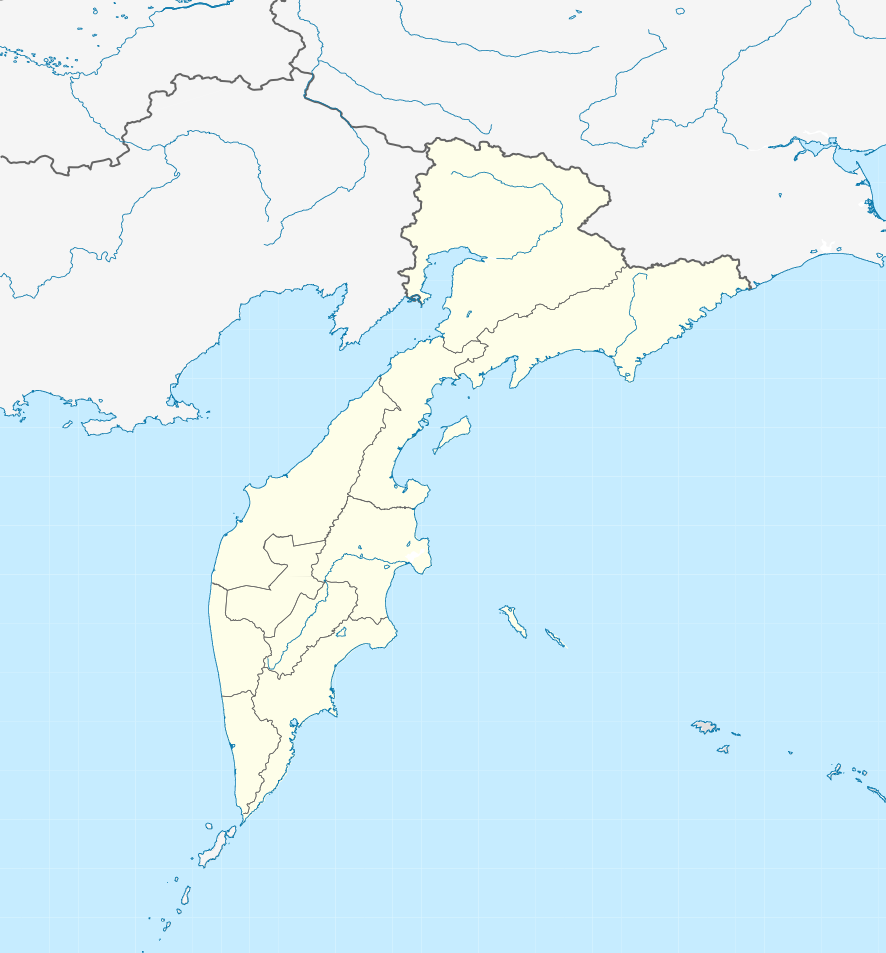
- Location of Korf Korf (Kamchatka Krai)
- Coordinates: 60°22′N 166°01′E
- Country: Russia
- Federal subject: Kamchatka Krai
- Administrative district: Olyutorsky District
- Founded: 1925
- Rural locality status since: 1994
- Elevation: 3 m (9.8 ft)

Population
  - Estimate (2012): 18 )
- Time zone: UTC+12 (MSK+9)
- Postal codes: 688810, 688811
- OKTMO ID: 30827404101

Korf (Russian: Корф) is a rural locality (a selo) and a port in Olyutorsky District of Koryak Okrug in Kamchatka Krai, Russia, located on a narrow sand spit opposite Tilichiki. Population: 18 (2012 est.); 3,147 (1989 Soviet census).

== History ==
It was established in 1925 on the coast of the Skrytaya Harbor of the Korfa Bay as a settlement of salmon fishers. In 1994, it was demoted in status from that of an urban-type settlement to rural locality. On April 21, 2006, Korf was destroyed by the 2006 Kamchatka earthquakes. Over eight hundred families were evacuated and the selo was slated to be abandoned. As of 2013, however, Korf has not been officially abolished.

The names of the village and the Korfa Bay commemorate the Russian German Andrey Korf (1831–1893), the first Viceroy (Governor General) of the Russian Far East (1884–93).

== Economy ==
Korf is connected to Tilichiki by ferry and to other neighboring locations by helicopter service. Platinum and lignite are mined in the district.

== Climate ==
Korf has a subarctic climate (Köppen Dfc), though owing to its maritime location the winters are not so severe as at the same latitude in the interior. For instance, the mean temperature of the coldest month is as much as 15 °C (27 °F) less severe than in Olyokminsk at the same latitude near the Pole of Cold. Precipitation also shows the pronounced maritime influence, with annual averages being typical of Kamchatka and around three or four times those of the interior at the same latitude. The heavier snow cover and milder winter temperatures mean that in spite of the mean temperature of the warmest month not reaching beyond +12.6 °C (54.7 °F), permafrost is only discontinuous. Strong winds, however, limit tree growth severely.

Climate data for Korf (1991–2020 normals, extremes 1929–2012)
Month	Jan	Feb	Mar	Apr	May	Jun	Jul	Aug	Sep	Oct	Nov	Dec	Year
Record high °C (°F)	5.8 (42.4)	7.2 (45.0)	4.9 (40.8)	8.7 (47.7)	19.5 (67.1)	26.4 (79.5)	29.7 (85.5)	27.1 (80.8)	18.9 (66.0)	13.4 (56.1)	10.1 (50.2)	7.3 (45.1)	29.7 (85.5)
Mean daily maximum °C (°F)	−11.0 (12.2)	−10.3 (13.5)	−6.7 (19.9)	−1.8 (28.8)	5.6 (42.1)	12.1 (53.8)	16.1 (61.0)	15.6 (60.1)	11.2 (52.2)	3.0 (37.4)	−4.7 (23.5)	−9.7 (14.5)	1.7 (35.1)
Daily mean °C (°F)	−14.2 (6.4)	−13.5 (7.7)	−9.9 (14.2)	−5.1 (22.8)	2.4 (36.3)	8.7 (47.7)	12.7 (54.9)	12.5 (54.5)	8.1 (46.6)	0.1 (32.2)	−7.2 (19.0)	−12.9 (8.8)	−1.5 (29.3)
Mean daily minimum °C (°F)	−17.1 (1.2)	−16.7 (1.9)	−13.3 (8.1)	−8.4 (16.9)	−0.4 (31.3)	6.0 (42.8)	10.1 (50.2)	9.9 (49.8)	5.4 (41.7)	−2.4 (27.7)	−10.2 (13.6)	−15.9 (3.4)	−4.4 (24.1)
Record low °C (°F)	−40.6 (−41.1)	−36 (−33)	−39.5 (−39.1)	−30.1 (−22.2)	−18.5 (−1.3)	−2.3 (27.9)	2.4 (36.3)	−0.4 (31.3)	−6.4 (20.5)	−20.6 (−5.1)	−33.1 (−27.6)	−38.7 (−37.7)	−40.6 (−41.1)
Average precipitation mm (inches)	24.2 (0.95)	20.4 (0.80)	28.8 (1.13)	17.1 (0.67)	24.0 (0.94)	31.6 (1.24)	45.3 (1.78)	69.2 (2.72)	55.8 (2.20)	51.9 (2.04)	50.9 (2.00)	21.3 (0.84)	440.5 (17.34)
Average precipitation days (≥ 0.1 mm)	5	4	6	4	5	7	7	9	8	8	8	4	75
Average relative humidity (%)	72	70	73	74	78	79	81	81	77	76	75	71	76
Mean monthly sunshine hours	76	102	167	224	210	206	202	171	149	126	72	47	1,752
Source 1: NOAA
Source 2: climatebase.ru (extremes)
