= List of territorial parks in the Northwest Territories =

This is a list of territorial parks in the Canadian territory of the Northwest Territories. They are maintained by NWT Parks.

== Territorial parks ==
Name	Region	Closest community	Coordinates
Nataiinlaii Territorial Park	Inuvik Region	Fort McPherson	67.350403°N 134.858779°W
Gwich'in Territorial Park	Inuvik Region	Inuvik	68.203347°N 133.425316°W
Jàk Territorial Park	Inuvik Region	Inuvik	68.333785°N 133.657200°W
Happy Valley Territorial Park	Inuvik Region	Inuvik	68.360472°N 133.737351°W
Fort Providence Territorial Park	South Slave Region	Fort Providence	61.328360°N 117.616151°W
North Arm Territorial Park	North Slave Region	Behchokǫ̀	62.724258°N 116.072172°W
Fred Henne Territorial Park	North Slave Region	Yellowknife	62.470678°N 114.416774°W
Hay River Territorial Park	South Slave Region	Hay River	60.863389°N 115.744954°W
Little Buffalo River Crossing Territorial Park	South Slave Region	Fort Resolution	60.993596°N 113.765992°W
Fort Simpson Territorial Park	Dehcho Region	Fort Simpson	61.855522°N 121.343640°W
Prelude Lake Territorial Park	North Slave Region	Yellowknife	62.564880°N 113.985881°W
Hidden Lake Territorial Park	North Slave Region	Yellowknife	62.530006°N 113.666009°W
Reid Lake Territorial Park	North Slave Region	Yellowknife	62.487178°N 113.469186°W
Blackstone Territorial Park	Dehcho Region	Nahanni Butte	61.100691°N 122.879798°W
MacKinnon Territorial Park	Sahtu Region	Norman Wells	65.262935°N 126.731150°W
60th Parallel Territorial Park	South Slave Region	Enterprise	60.001199°N 116.977699°W
Twin Falls Gorge Territorial Park	South Slave Region	Enterprise	60.507431°N 116.248828°W
Lady Evelyn Falls Territorial Park	South Slave Region	Kakisa	60.962056°N 117.327633°W
Sambaa Deh Falls Territorial Park	Dehcho Region	Jean Marie River	61.143323°N 119.844750°W
Little Buffalo River Falls Territorial Park	South Slave Region	Fort Smith	60.042049°N 112.705257°W
Queen Elizabeth Territorial Park	South Slave Region	Fort Smith	60.023316°N 111.911864°W
Yellowknife River Territorial Park	North Slave Region	Yellowknife	62.518252°N 114.319420°W
Chan Lake Territorial Park	South Slave Region	Fort Providence	61.895394°N 116.536961°W
Prosperous Lake Territorial Park	North Slave Region	Yellowknife	62.537938°N 114.146889°W
Madeline Lake Territorial Park	North Slave Region	Yellowknife	62.548687°N 114.064370°W
Pontoon Lake Territorial Park	North Slave Region	Yellowknife	62.552101°N 114.025456°W
Powder Point Territorial Park	North Slave Region	Yellowknife	62.518907°N 113.737396°W
Dory Point Territorial Park	South Slave Region	Fort Providence	61.245057°N 117.482823°W
Cameron River Crossing Territorial Park	North Slave Region	Yellowknife	62.492515°N 113.549057°W
Alexandra Falls Territorial Park	South Slave Region	Enterprise	60.500456°N 116.283211°W
McNallie Creek Territorial Park	South Slave Region	Enterprise	60.777846°N 116.574541°W
Kakisa River Territorial Park	South Slave Region	Kakisa	60.985119°N 117.245755°W
Fort Smith Mission Territorial Park	South Slave Region	Fort Smith	60.004367°N 111.880094°W

== Day use areas ==
Some day use areas are within Territorial Parks, other day use areas are Territorial Parks, and some are neither. This list includes them all.

Name	Region	Closest community	Coordinates
Tetlit Gwinjik Day Use Area	Inuvik Region	Fort McPherson	67.304365°N 135.030662°W
Yellowknife River Territorial Park Day Use Area	North Slave Region	Yellowknife	62.518252°N 114.319420°W
Chan Lake Territorial Park Day Use Area	South Slave Region	Fort Providence	61.895394°N 116.536961°W
Prosperous Lake Territorial Park Day Use Area	North Slave Region	Yellowknife	62.537938°N 114.146889°W
Madeline Lake Territorial Park Day Use Area	North Slave Region	Yellowknife	62.548687°N 114.064370°W
Pontoon Lake Territorial Park Day Use Area	North Slave Region	Yellowknife	62.552101°N 114.025456°W
Powder Point Territorial Park Day Use Area	North Slave Region	Yellowknife	62.518907°N 113.737396°W
Cameron Falls Day Use Area	North Slave Region	Yellowknife	62.519882°N 113.688272°W
Tithegeh Chii Vitaii Lookout	Inuvik Region	Inuvik	68.186889°N 133.442137°W
Ehjuu Njik Day Use Area	Inuvik Region	Inuvik	
Nihtak Day Use Area	Inuvik Region	Inuvik	
Dory Point Territorial Park Day Use Area	South Slave Region	Fort Providence	61.245057°N 117.482823°W
Cameron River Crossing Territorial Park Day Use Area	North Slave Region	Yellowknife	62.492515°N 113.549057°W
Blackstone River Day Use Area	Dehcho Region	Nahanni Butte	61.056244°N 122.898030°W
Alexandra Falls Territorial Park Day Use Area	South Slave Region	Enterprise	60.500456°N 116.283211°W
McNallie Creek Territorial Park Day Use Area	South Slave Region	Enterprise	60.777846°N 116.574541°W
Kakisa River Territorial Park Day Use Area	South Slave Region	Kakisa	60.985119°N 117.245755°W
Fort Smith Mission Territorial Park Day Use Area	South Slave Region	Fort Smith	60.004367°N 111.880094°W
Fred Henne Territorial Park Day Use Area	North Slave Region	Yellowknife	62.470678°N 114.416774°W

== See also ==
- List of protected areas of the Northwest Territories
