= 57th parallel =

57th parallel may refer to:

- 57th parallel north, a circle of latitude in the Northern Hemisphere
- 57th parallel south, a circle of latitude in the Southern Hemisphere
