= Korfa Bay =

Bay of the Bering Sea

Coordinates: 60°02′N 165°44′E

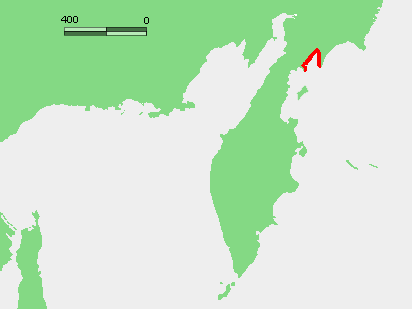
The red outlines Korfa Bay

Korf Bay (Russian: залив Корфа) is a bay on the Kamchatka Peninsula coast of the Bering Sea in Russia.

== Geography ==
It is approximately triangular, being about 70 kilometers (43 mi) wide at the mouth and extending inland about 75 kilometers (47 mi).

On the west side, the Ilpinsky Peninsula separates it from Anapka Bay, which forms the north end of Karaginsky Gulf. On the east, the Govena Peninsula (Cape Govensky) separates it from the Olyutor Gulf. The northern coast contains the Skrytaya Harbor, which is a major salmon fishing ground.

The largest settlements on the gulf are Tilichiki and Olyutorovka.

== History ==
The bay is named after Baron Andrey Korf, the first Governor General of Priamurye. This is the Baron Korf or Barankoff Bay mentioned by the American travelers Washington Vanderlip and Olaf Swenson.

The 2006 Kamchatka earthquakes were centered on the seaside village of Korf. Coal was mined and exported from a mine near the bay in the early 20th century.
