= 56th parallel =

56th parallel may refer to:

- 56th parallel north, a circle of latitude in the Northern Hemisphere
- 56th parallel south, a circle of latitude in the Southern Hemisphere
