= 58th parallel =

58th parallel may refer to:

- 58th parallel north, a circle of latitude in the Northern Hemisphere
- 58th parallel south, a circle of latitude in the Southern Hemisphere

58th parallel north	58th parallel south
