= Commander Basin =

Basin located in the Pacific

Coordinates: 57°27′N 166°35′E

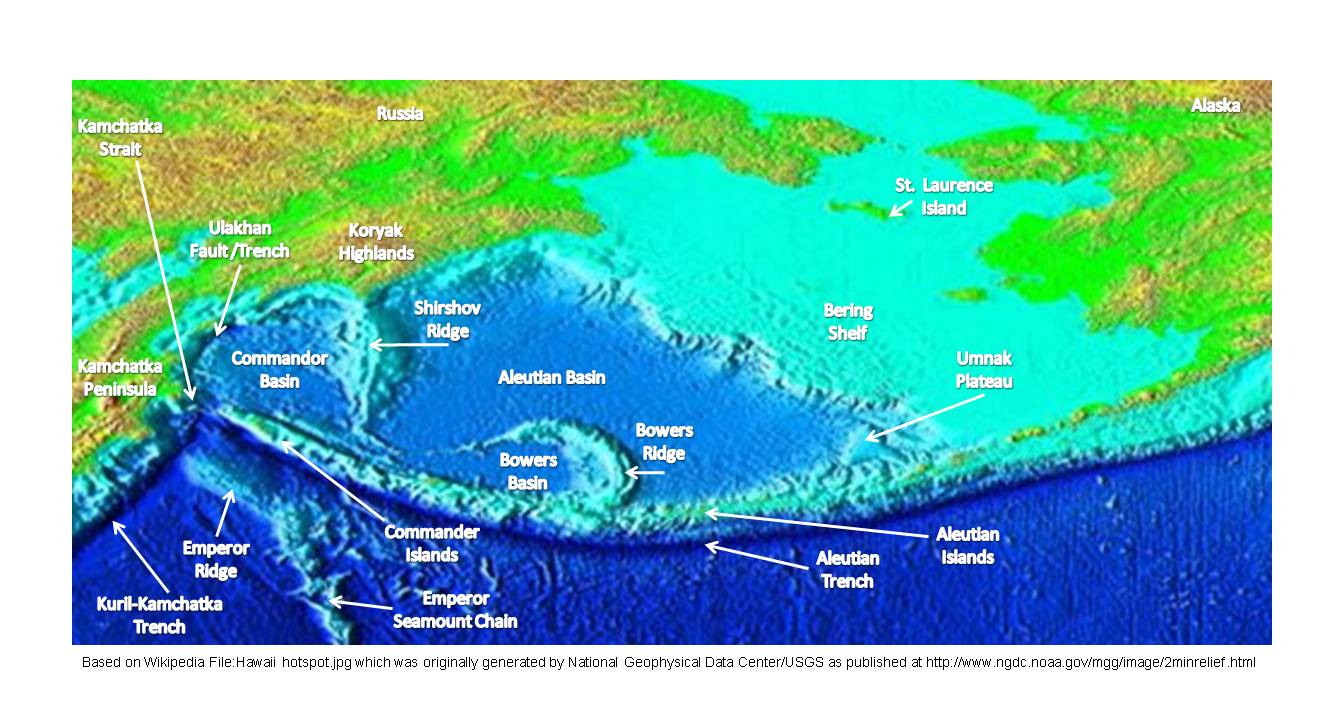
Aleutian Basin features.

The Commander Basin (alternately Komandorsky Basin) is located between the Shirshov Ridge and the Kamchatka Peninsula. Its southern boundary is the Aleutian arc (see figure) and occupies the western part of the Bering Sea. The Kamchatka Strait provides a deep water access to the basin from the southwest.

The basins sedimentary cover is less than 2 km thick. In the southwestern portion of the basin near the Ulakahn Fault, linear magnetic anomalies associated with the Early Miocene have been identified. The magnetic anomalies support a sequential opening of the Commander Basin resulting from stresses on the interface between the Eurasian and Pacific plates. The structures of the Bering Sea floor at the Commander Basin were created 17 to 21 Million years before the present.

The Commander Basin floor is a horizontal plain 3800–3900 m deep. It is covered with 2000–6000 m of sediment overlying an oceanic crust which is 12–14 km thick. Active spreading in the Commander Basin occurred between 40 and 10 Myr ago, with subduction of the basin floor along the Ulakhan fault underneath the Kamchatka peninsula. There are four major fracture zones in the basin and magnetic lineations have been detected in the basin. Except in the southern end of the basin, the spreading center has been subducted.

The water in the basin circulates in a cyclonic gyre, with the western Kamchatka Current flowing southward along the Kamchatka Peninsula. The northward leg of the gyre is outside of the Commander Basin, and is carried by the Bering Slope Current, which flows along the edge of the continental shelf at the eastern edge of the Aleutian Basin. To the south, the Commander Basin connects to the North Pacific through the 4.4 km wide, 4,420 meter deep Kamchatka Strait and the 2.0 km wide, 2,000 meter deep Near Strait.
