= 59th parallel =

59th parallel may refer to:

- 59th parallel north, a circle of latitude in the Northern Hemisphere
- 59th parallel south, a circle of latitude in the Southern Hemisphere
