= Aleutian Basin =

Oceanic basin in the Bering Sea

Coordinates: 57°N 177°E

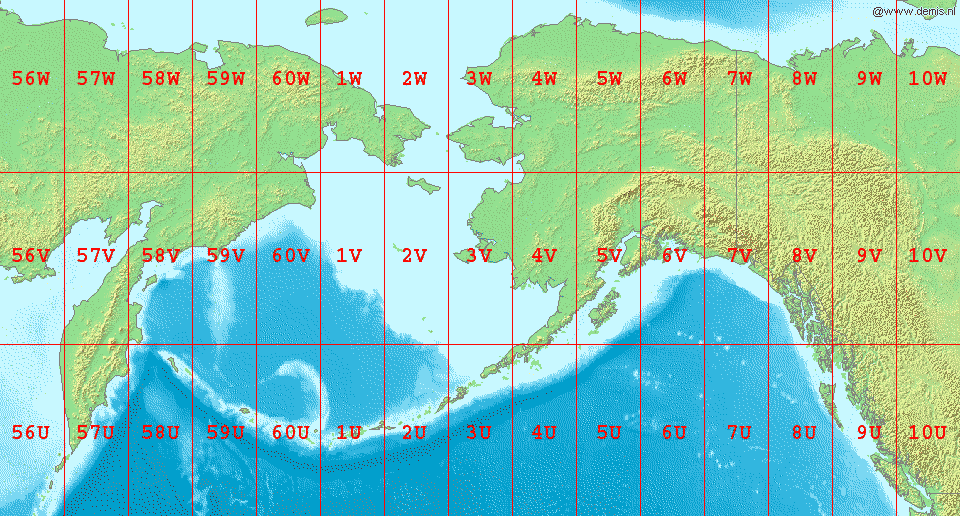
Map of the Bering Sea, with the Aleutian Basin clearly discernable here in the southwest portion of the sea.

The Aleutian Basin is an oceanic basin located beneath the southwestern Bering Sea. While the northeastern half of the Bering Sea is situated over the North American Plate in relatively shallow waters, the Aleutian Basin comprises an oceanic plate, which is the remaining portion of the Kula Plate that was predominantly subducted beneath the North American Plate.

Subduction of the Kula Plate came to a halt following the formation of the Aleutian Trench situated to its south. The remaining portion of the Kula Plate became attached to the North American Plate. This former subduction zone is now known as the Beringian Margin, which currently accommodates sixteen submarine canyons, including Zhemchug Canyon, recognized as the world's largest.

The deep-water part of the Bering Sea is separated into the Commander Basin and Bowers basins by the submarine Shirshov Ridge and Bowers Ridge. The Commander Basin occupies the western part of the Bering Sea, with the Shirshov Ridge on its eastern border. The Shirshov Ridge extends 750 km southward from the Russian Olyutorskii Peninsula to connect with Bowers Ridge. The Bowers Ridge extends in the form of an arc over approximately 900 km from the Aleutian Islands Arc to the northwestern termination, where it meets Shirshov Ridge. This former island arc, Bowers Ridge, is a prominent semi-circular-shaped geological that meets the Aleutian arc and, together with the Aleutians, bounds Bowers Basin.

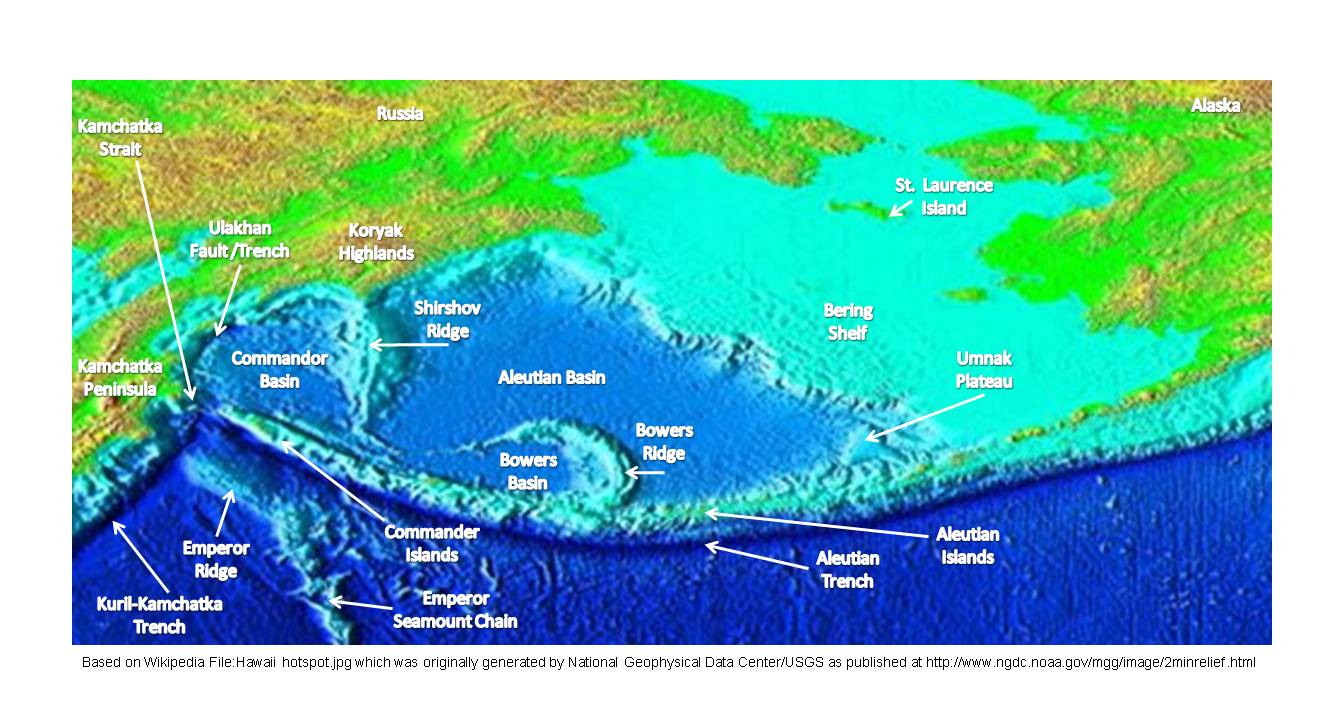
Aleutian Basin features.

The northern part of the Shirshov Ridge formed 95 My before the present. The ridge grows younger as it goes south, with the southern part of the Shirshov Ridge formed 33 My ago (Early Oligocene). Bowers Ridge was formed 30 My before the present (Late Oligocene).
