= Olyutor Peninsula =

Peninsula in Kamchatka Krai, Russia

Олюторский полуостров
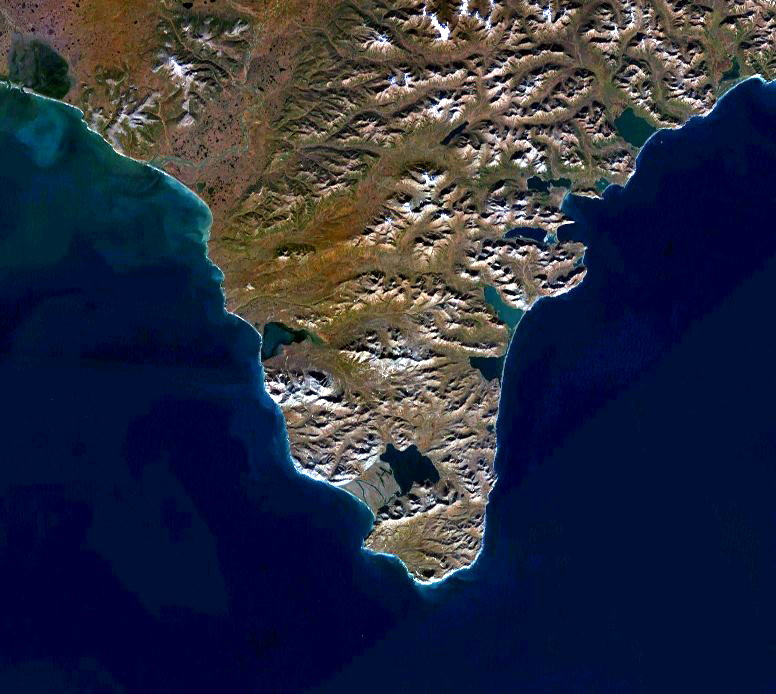
- Satellite image of the peninsula

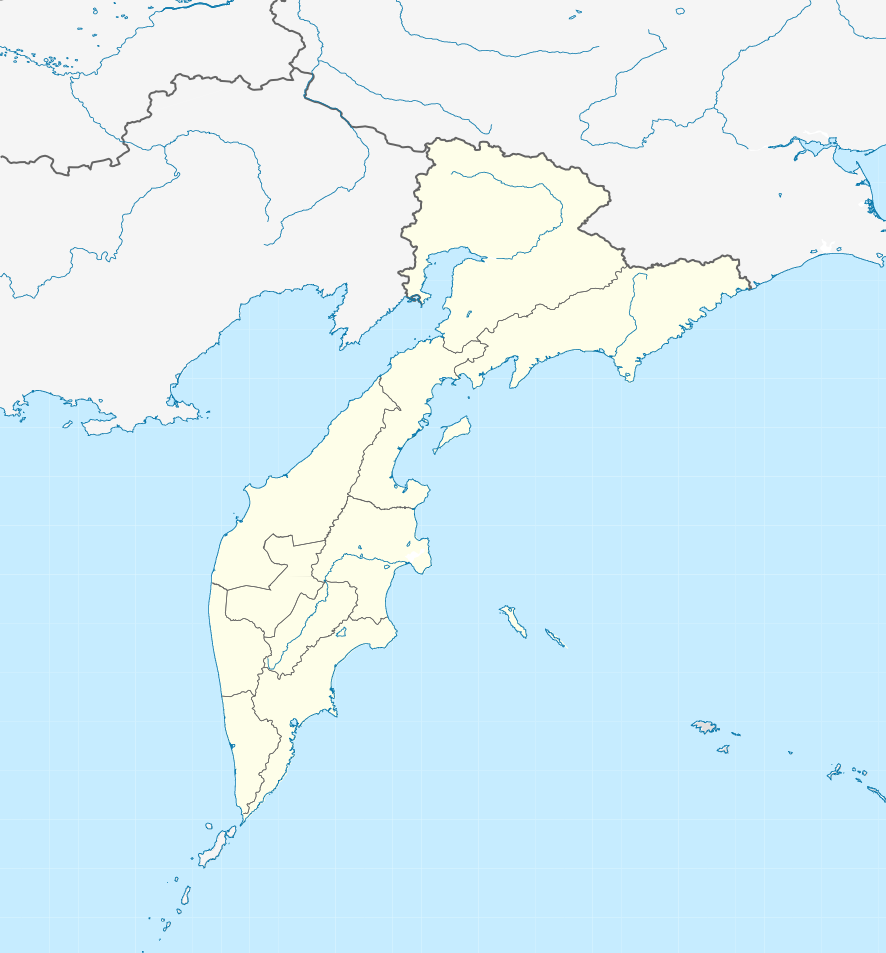
- Location within Kamchatka Krai Location within Far Eastern Federal District

Geography
- Location: Kamchatka Krai, Russia
- Coordinates: 60°15′N 170°12′E
- Adjacent to: Olyutor Gulf; Bering Sea
- Length: 70 km (43 mi)
- Width: 50 km (31 mi)
- Highest elevation: 917 m (3009 ft)
- Highest point: Gora Seraya

Administration
- Russia
- Federal subject: Kamchatka Krai

Olyutor Peninsula (Russian: Олюторский полуостров) is a peninsula in Kamchatka Krai, Russian Federation. The nearest town is Tilichiki, Olyutorsky District.

The peninsula is named after the Olyutor people, the ancient inhabitants of the area.

== Geography ==
The Olyutor Peninsula is the southern extremity of the Olyutor Range, jutting southwards with the Olyutor Gulf to the west and the Bering Sea to the east. The southern end of the peninsula is Cape Olyutor (Mys Olyutorsky). The peninsula and its attached mountain range to the north are a mainland prolongation of the submerged Shirshov Ridge of the Bering Sea.
