= Chan Lake Territorial Park =

Territorial park in the Northwest Territories, Canada

Coordinates: 61.895394°N 116.536961°W

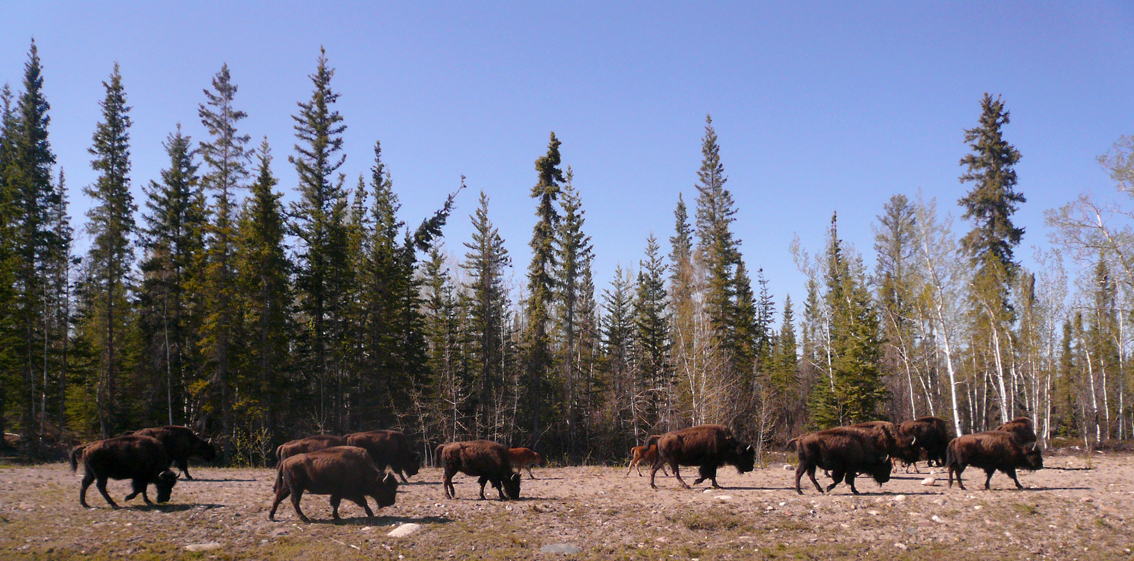
Wood bison along the Yellowknife Highway

Chan Lake Territorial Park is a small territorial park in the Northwest Territories of Canada, one of six such parks on the Yellowknife Highway (Hwy #3) and one of 34 parks maintained by the Northwest Territories government under the Territorial Parks Act of 1988.

The park is positioned between the road and the lake, 123 km north of the intersection between the Yellowknife Highway and the Waterfall Highway (Hwy #1), and is located at the north end of the Mackenzie Bison Sanctuary. It provides facilities for people travelling between Fort Providence and Yellowknife. The community nearest to the park is Behchoko (Rae-Edzo).

The park is for day-use only, and has picnic tables, pit toilets and a kitchen shelter, designed to afford a sheltered place to light a small cooking fire. Pets are welcome on a leash. It is open during the summer from May 15 to September 15.

Mackenzie Bison Sanctuary is under twenty minutes from the park and bison can be encountered both on the highway and in the park itself. The lake is on the migration path of several birds: ducks, geese, loons, swans, and sandhill cranes may be seen.

== See also ==
- List of Canadian provincial parks
- List of protected areas of the Northwest Territories
