= Cape Olyutor =

Cape in Kamchatka Krai, Russia

Cape Olyutor Russian: мыс Олюторский
- Cape
- Coordinates: 59°55′33″N 170°17′16″E
- Location: Olyutor Peninsula; Kamchatka Krai, Russia
- Offshore water bodies: Olyutorsky Bay; Bering Sea

Area
  - Total: Russian Far East

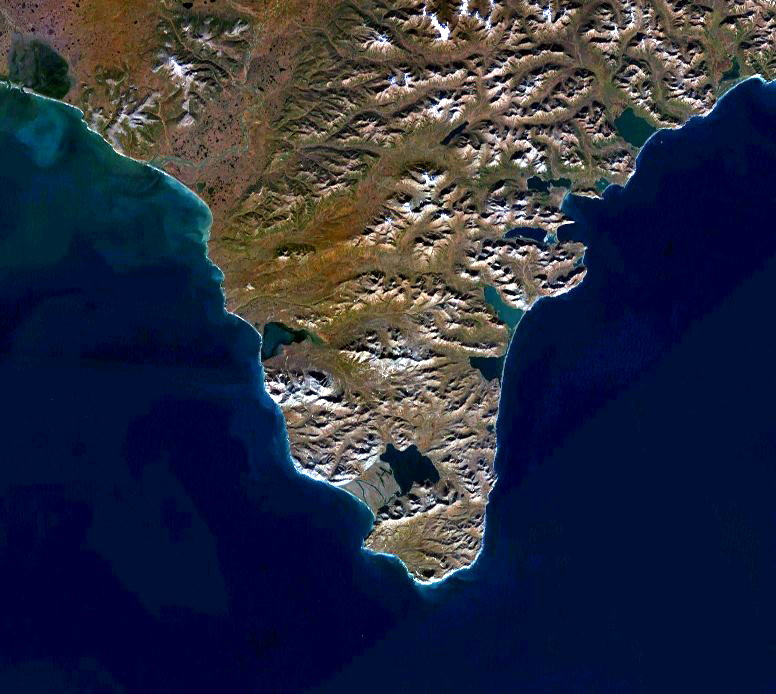
Aerial view of Cape Olyutor

Cape Olyutor (Russian: мыс Олюторский) is a cape in the Bering Sea, in Koryak Okrug of Kamchatka Krai, Russia. It points south at the southern end of the Olyutor Peninsula, the southern end of the Olyutor Range. It was named after the Alyutor ethnic group.

The Kereks, a former maritime hunting people of the Russian Bering Sea coast, were living between the cape and the Gulf of Anadyr.

== See also ==
- Captain Vladimir Voronin
