= Andrey Korf =

Andrey Nikolayevich Korf
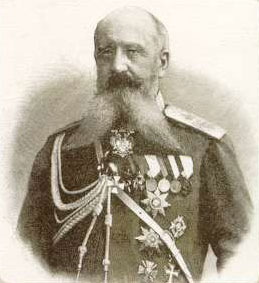
- General Andrey Korf
- Born: 1831
- Died: 1893
- Allegiance: Russian Empire
- Service / branch: Imperial Russian Army
- Commands: 13th Infantry Division (Russian Empire)

Baron Andrey Nikolayevich Korf or Korff (Russian: Андрей Николаевич Корф; 1831–1893) was the first Viceroy (Governor General) of the Russian Far East (1884–93). The names of the village of Korf and the Korfa Bay commemorate him.

He came from the Korff noble family. He was an Imperial Russian baron of Baltic German descent and an infantry general of the Imperial Russian Army. Andrey Korff took part in the Caucasian War and led an attack on Veden in 1859. He initiated the establishment of the Officers Infantry School.

In 1884, Korf was put in charge of the newly established Maritime Governorate-General, which included the Russian Far East from the island of Sakhalin in the east to Lake Baikal in the west. Korff undertook some measures that facilitated further development of the region. He worked to improve education, to encourage colonization of the Ussuri River basin, to protect the sealskin trade, to create commercial relations with Japan and China, and to build coal mines on the island of Sakhalin.
He was also appointed as the first commander of the Amur Military District, a post he would hold until his death on 7 February 1893.

Baron Korff's marble tomb in the Khabarovsk City Cathedral was destroyed by the Communists in 1930. The Soviet historians held him responsible for the Kara Incident of 1889.

Preceded by	Commander of the 13th Infantry Division; 1879-1884	Succeeded by
