= Bowers Ridge =

Currently seismically inactive ridge in the southern part of the Aleutian Basin

Coordinates: 54°00′N 179°59′E

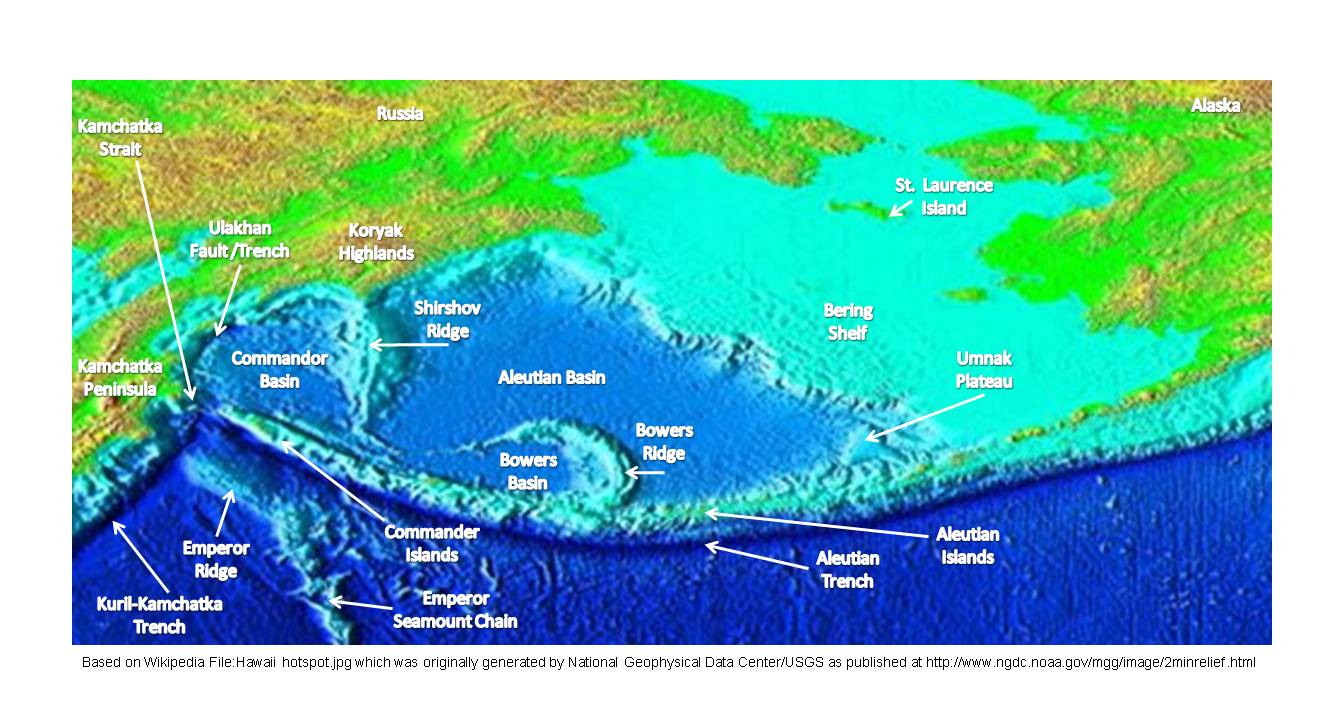
Bering Sea features. Bowers Ridge is in the southern part of the Bering Sea.

The Bowers Ridge is located in the southern part of the Aleutian Basin. It extends over 900 km (560 mi) in an arc, starting in the southeast at the Aleutian Arc and terminating to the northwest at the Shirshov Ridge. The Bowers Ridge arc separates the Aleutian Basin from the Bowers Basin, which it encloses. The ridge is not currently seismically active. The northern slope of the ridge is steeper than the southern slope. On the Aleutian side, the ridge is rimmed by a trough filled with a sedimentary sequence 9–10 km thick.

The average age of the Bowers Ridge is about 30 My (Late Oligocene). Rock from the upper part of the Bowers Ridge was determined to be of Miocene age. Hence the Bowers Ridge and the southern part of the Shirshov Ridge are of roughly the same age since the adjacent region of the Shirshov Ridge is dated at 33 My B.P. (Early Oligocene).
