= Fred Henne Territorial Park =

Territorial park in the Northwest Territories, Canada

Coordinates: 62°28′16″N 114°25′01″W

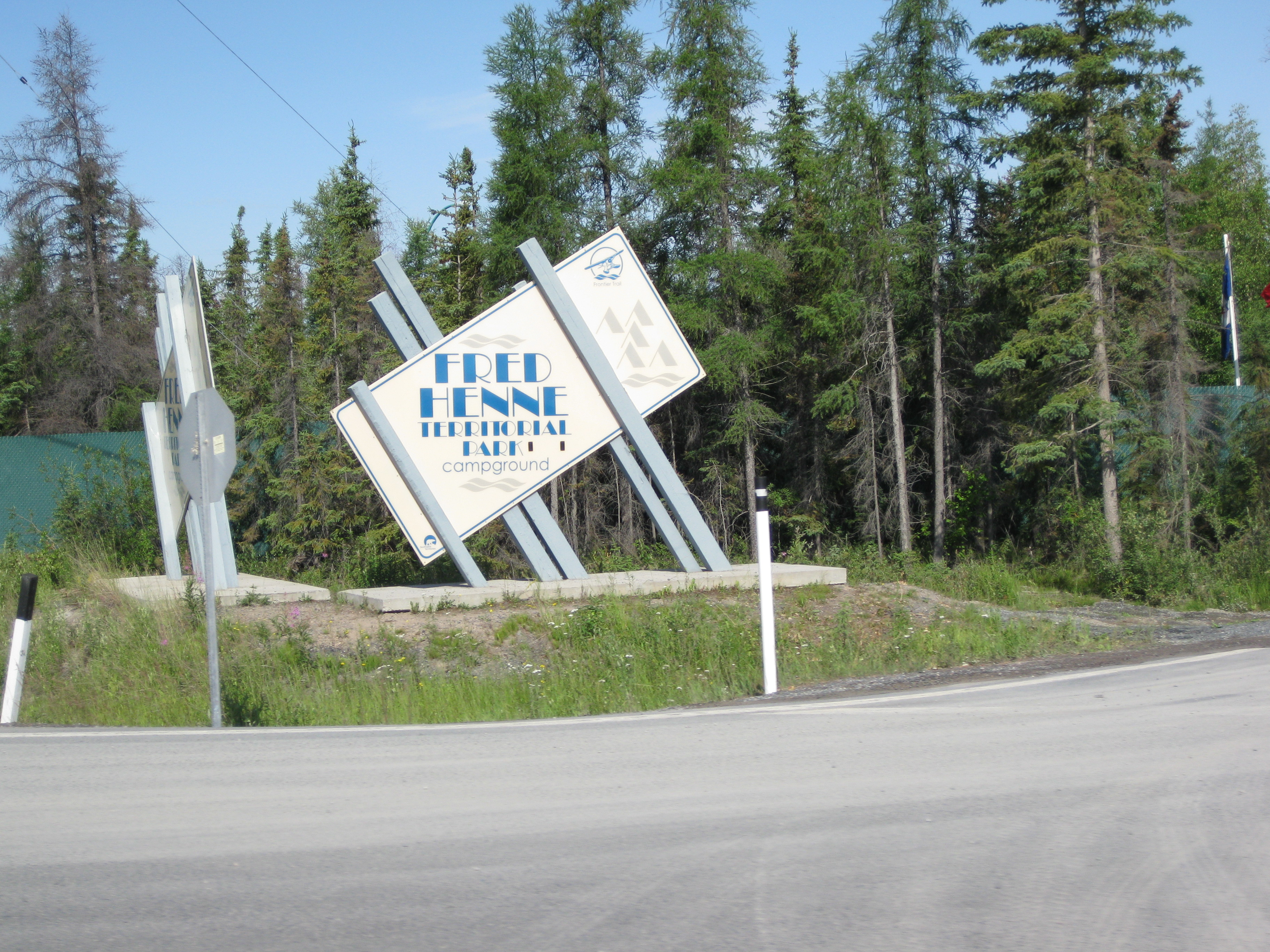
- Fred Henne Territorial Park sign
- Interactive map of Fred Henne Territorial Park
- Type: Territorial park
- Location: Northwest Territories, Canada
- Nearest city: Yellowknife
- Designation: Canadian protected area

Fred Henne Territorial Park is a territorial park in the Northwest Territories of Canada, located on Long Lake near Yellowknife. It is one of 34 parks maintained by the Northwest Territories government under the Territorial Parks Act of 1988, and is also listed as a Canadian Protected Area. The Park is a termination point of the Frontier Trail and the Cameron Falls Trail. The park is named for Fred W. Henne, a former mayor of Yellowknife.
