= Comitative case =

Grammatical case denoting accompaniment

In grammar, the comitative case (abbreviated COM) is a grammatical case that denotes accompaniment. In English, the preposition "with", in the sense of "in company with" or "together with", plays a substantially similar role. Other uses of "with", like in the meaning of "using" or "by means of" (I cut bread with a knife), correspond to the instrumental case or related cases.

== Core meaning ==
The comitative case encodes a relationship of "accompaniment" between two participants in an event, called the "accompanier" and the "companion". In addition, there is a "relator" (which can be of multiple lexical categories, but is most commonly an affix or adposition). Use of the comitative case gives prominence to the accompanier. This Italian sentence is an example:

[il professore]_{accompanier} entra nell'aula [con]_{relator} [i suoi studenti]_{companion}
'the professor enters the lecture-hall (together) with his students'.

In this case, il professore is the accompanier, i suoi studenti is the companion, and con is the relator. As the accompanier, il professore is the most prominent.

Animacy also plays a major role in most languages with a comitative case. One group of languages requires both the accompanier and the companion to be either human or animate. Another group requires both to be in the same category: both human or both animate. A third group requires an animate accompanier and an inanimate companion. Other languages have no restrictions based on animacy.

== Comparison to similar cases ==
The comitative case is often conflated or confused with other similar cases, especially the instrumental case and the associative case.

The comitative relates to an accompanier and a companion, and the instrumental relates to an agent, an object, and a patient. Enrique Palancar defines the role of Instrumental case as 'the role played by the object the Agent manipulates to achieve a change of state of the Patient.' Even though the difference is straightforward, because the instrumental and the comitative are expressed the same way in many languages, including English, it is often difficult to separate them.

Russian is one of many languages that differentiate morphologically between instrumental and comitative:

Я пойду в кино с мамой
Ya poydu v kino s mamoy
I go in cinema with mom.COM
'I'll go to the cinema with my mom.'

Я нарезал хлеб этим ножом
Ya narezal khleb etim nozhom
I cut bread this.INSTR knife.INSTR
'I cut the bread with this knife.'

In Russian, the comitative is marked by adding a preposition с and by declining the companion in the instrumental case; the design с мамой as a whole becomes comitative. In the instrumental case, the object is declined, but no preposition is added.

The comitative case is often confused with the associative case. Before the term comitative was applied to the accompanier-companion relationship, the relationship was often called associative case, a term still used by some linguists.

It is important to distinguish between the comitative and the associative because the associative also refers to a specific variety of the comitative case that is used in Hungarian.

== Expressions of comitative semantic relation ==
Grammatical case is a category of inflectional morphology. The comitative case is an expression of the comitative semantic relation through inflectional affixation, by prefixes, suffixes and circumfixes. Although all three major types of affixes are used in at least a few languages, suffixes are the most common expression. Languages which use affixation to express the comitative include Hungarian, which uses suffixes; Totonac, which uses prefixes; and Chukchi, which uses circumfixes.

Comitative relations are also commonly expressed by using adpositions: prepositions, postpositions and circumpositions. Examples of languages that use adpositional constructions to express comitative relations are French, which uses prepositions; Wayãpi, which uses postpositions; and Bambara, which uses circumpositions.

Adverbial constructions can also mark comitative relations, but they act very similarly to adpositions. One language that uses adverbs to mark the comitative case is Latvian.

The final way in which comitative relations can be expressed is by serial-verb constructions. In these languages, the comitative marker is usually a verb whose basic meaning is "to follow". A language which marks comitative relations with serial-verb constructions is Chinese.

== Examples ==
=== Indo-European languages ===
==== Latvian ====
In Latvian, both instrumental and comitative are expressed with the preposition ar However, it is used only when the companion is in accusative and singular or when it is in dative and plural. Otherwise the co-ordinating conjunction un is used.

un Nelda ar Rudolfu ļoti nozīmīgi pa-skatījās uz Ernestīni
and Nelda.NOM COM Rudolf.ACC very significantly at-look.PRET.REFL.3 on Ernestine.ACC
'And Nelda and Rudolf looked very knowingly at Ernestine.'

In the example above, ar is used because Rudolf, the companion, is in accusative and singular. Below, it is used in the other case that it is allowed, with a dative plural companion.

jo ne-bija ne-kāda prieka dzīvot zem sveša jumta un vēl ar vis-iem zirg-iem un rat-iem
because NEG-be.PAST.3 NEG-some.GEN fun.GEN live.INF under foreign.GEN roof.GEN and still COM all-DAT.PL horse-DAT.PL and cart-DAT.PL
'Because it was no fun to live under someone else's roof, especially with all the horses and the cart'.

=== Uralic languages ===
==== Estonian ====
In Estonian, the comitative (kaasaütlev) marker is the suffix -ga.

ja Barber rüüpa-b koos Balthasari-ga sügava sõõmu
and Barber drink-3SG together Balthasar-COM deep.GEN mouthful.GEN
'And Barber takes a sip together with Balthasar.'

==== Finnish ====
In Finnish, the comitative case (komitatiivi) consists of the suffix -ne with adjectives and -ne- + a mandatory possessive suffix with the main noun. There is no singular-plural distinction; only the plural of the comitative exists and is used in both singular and plural senses, and thus it always appears as -ine-. For instance, "with their big ships" is

suuri-ne laivo-i-ne-en
big-COM ship-OBL-PL-COM-POS.3PL

while "with his/her big ships" is

suuri-ne laivo-i-ne-nsa
big-COM ship-OBL-PL-COM-POS.3SG

It is rarely used and is mainly a feature of formal literary language, appearing very rarely in everyday speech.

The much more common, less formal way of expressing "with" is with the postposition kanssa, e.g., suurten laivojensa kanssa 'with their big ships'. The two forms may contrast, however, since the comitative always comes with the possessive suffix and thus can only be used when the agent has some sort of possession of the thing expressed by the main noun. For instance, Ulkoministeri jatkaa kollegoineen neuvotteluja sissien kanssa, 'The foreign minister, with [assistance from] his colleagues, is continuing the negotiations with the guerrillas', has kollegoineen 'with his colleagues' contrasted with sissien kanssa 'with the guerrillas', the former "possessed", the latter not.

Colloquial Finnish also has the postposition kaa, derived from kanssa and cognate with the Estonian -ga. Compare also Ingrian -nka/-nkä, e.g., talonka 'with a house'.

mun kaa
1SG.GEN with
'with me'

mun kavereitten kaa
1SG-GEN friend-GEN-PL with
'with my friends'

==== Sami languages ====
As there are many Sami languages there are variations between them. In the largest Sami language, Northern Sami, the comitative case means either communion, fellowship, connection - or instrument, tool. It can be used either as an object or as an adverbial.

It is expressed through the suffix -in in the singular and -iguin in the plural.

An example of the object use in Northern Sami is Dat láve álo riidalit isidiin 'She always argues with her husband'. An example of the adverbial use is Mun čálán bleahkain 'I write with ink'.

==== Hungarian ====
In Hungarian, comitative case is marked by the suffix -stul/-stül, as shown in the example below.

ruhá-stul és cipő-stül feküd-t-em az ágy-ban
clothes-COM and shoe-COM lie-PAST-INDEF.1SG the bed-INE
'I was lying in bed with my clothes and shoes on.'

However, the comitative case marker cannot be used if the companion has a plural marker. So when the comitative marker is added to a noun, it obscures whether that noun is singular or plural.

gyerek-estül men-t-ek nyaral-ni
child-COM go-PAST-INDEF.3PL vacation-INF
'They went on vacation with their child/children.'

=== Chukchi ===
Chukchi uses a circumfix to express comitative case.

а'ачек ңытоскычат-гьэ га-мэлгар-ма
aʼaček ňytoskyčat-gʹè ga-mèlgar-ma
boy ran.out-PERF COM.PRED-gun-COM.PRED
'The boy ran out with a gun.'

In the example, the circumfix га⟩...⟨ма is attached to the root мэлгар 'gun' to express comitative.

=== Drehu ===
In Drehu, there are two prepositions which can be used to mark comitative. Which of the prepositions is used is determined by the classes of the accompanier and companion.

ɑngeic ɑ tro me eni
3SG PRES go COM 1SG
'He goes with me.'

eni ɑ ixelë memin lɑ jɑjiny
1SG PRES meet COM ART girl
'I met (with) the girl.'

=== Hausa ===
The comitative marker in Hausa is the preposition dà. In Hausa, a prepositional phrase marked for comitative can be moved to the front of the sentence for emphasis, as shown in the examples below.

(tàare) dà yâara-n-shì fa, yaa zoo nannìyà
(together) with children-of-3SG.M indeed 3SG.M.PFV come here
'With his children indeed, he came here.'

(tàare) dà Bàlaa née na jee kàasuwaa
(together) with Bala COP 1SG.RP go market
'It is with Bala that I went to the market.'

In Hausa it is ungrammatical to do the same with coordinating conjunctions. For example, if the companions were "dog and cat", it would be ungrammatical to move either "dog" or "cat" to the front of the sentence for emphasis, while it is grammatical to do so when there is a comitative marker rather than a conjunction.
