= Kamchatka Strait =

Strait in Russia

Coordinates: 55°39′N 164°33′E

Kamchatka Strait (Russian: Камчатский пролив) is a 191 km-wide strait off the mainland coast of Kamchatka Krai in the Russian Far East.

== Geography ==
It separates the mainland on Kamchatka Peninsula from Bering Island, one of the Commander Islands group.

Kamchatka Strait connects the Bering Sea in the north with the Pacific Ocean in the south.
