= Olyutor Range =

Mountain range in Kamchatka Krai, Russia

- Олюторский хребет
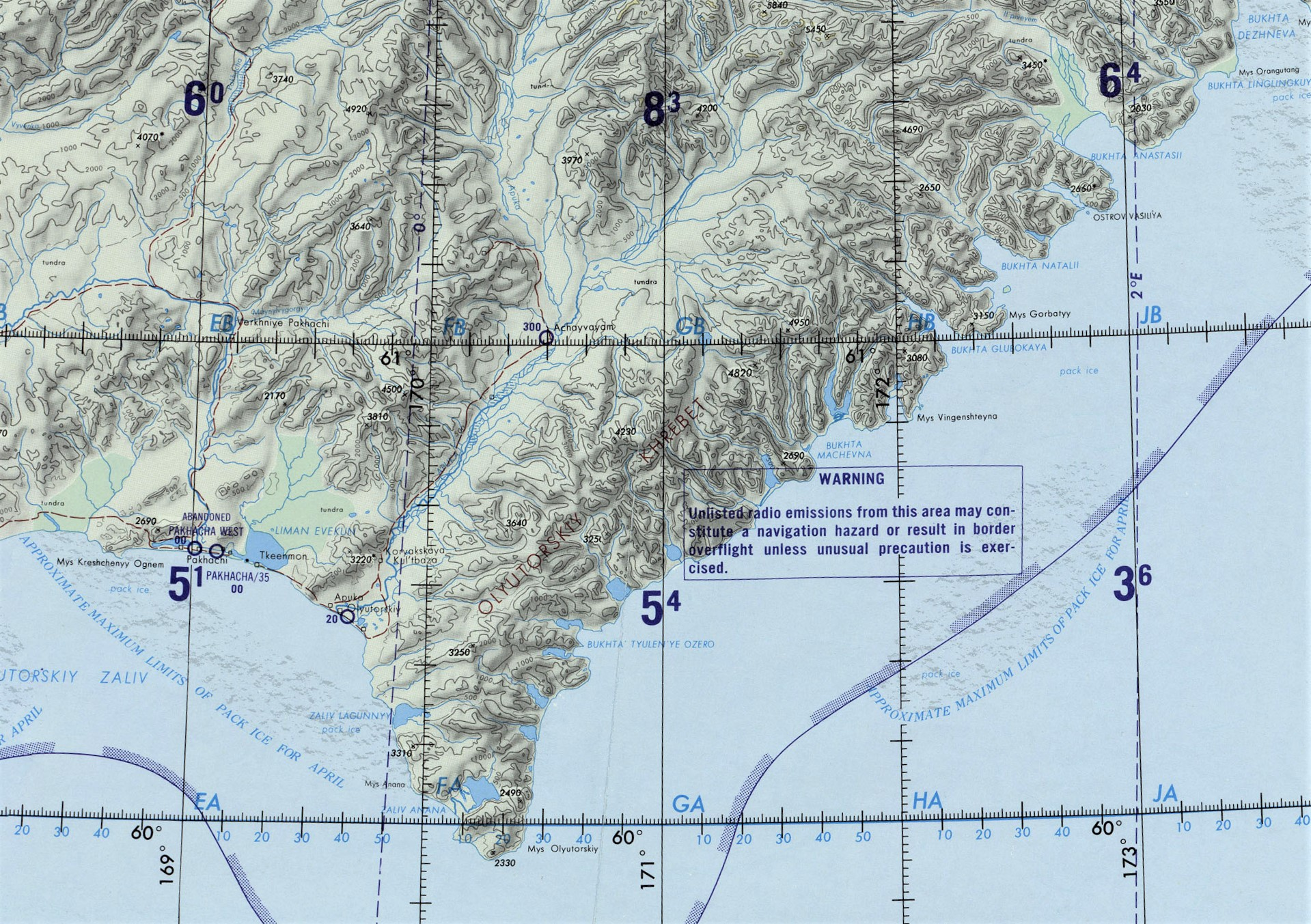
- Olyutor Range map section

Highest point
- Peak: Greben
- Elevation: 1,568 m (5,144 ft)
- Coordinates: 60°42′22″N 170°35′03″E

Dimensions
- Length: 250 km (160 mi) NE/SW
- Width: 50 km (31 mi) NW/SE

Geography
- Location within Kamchatka Krai Location within Far Eastern Federal District
- Location: Kamchatka Krai, Russia
- Range coordinates: 60°32′N 170°20′E
- Parent range: Koryak Highlands; East Siberian Mountains

Geology
- Orogeny: Alpine orogeny
- Rock age: Upper Cretaceous
- Rock type(s): Volcanic rock, slate and sandstone

Climbing
- Easiest route: From Tilichiki

The Olyutor Range (Russian: Олюторский хребет) is a range of mountains in Kamchatka Krai, Russian Far East. Administratively the range is part of Olyutorsky District.

The range is a mainland prolongation of the submerged Shirshov Ridge of the Bering Sea.

== Geography ==
The Olyutor Range is a coastal mountain chain, with its eastern flank facing the Bering Sea. It is part of the Koryak Highland system. Despite the relatively small height of the range, its mountains have an alpine character with sharp, pointed ridgetops and steep slopes covered with scree. Deep river gorges and glacial valleys are widespread. The highest point is Greben, a 1,568 metres (5,144 ft) high peak.

To the north rises the Snegovoy Range and the southern part of the range forms the Olyutor Peninsula, jutting southwards with the Olyutor Gulf to the west. The southern end of the peninsula is Cape Olyutor (Mys Olyutorsky).

== Climate and flora ==
The climate is influenced by the ocean. Summers are short and cool, with frequent fog and rains. Winters are long and cold, often windy, frosts are relatively rare.

The mountains are covered with dwarf forests, Erman's birch groves, meadows and coastal tundra.

== See also ==
- Bering tundra
- List of mountains and hills of Russia
