= Associative case =

Grammatical case

The associative case (abbreviated ASS) is a grammatical case which expresses associativity which is, although related, not identical to comitativity, which is expressed by using the comitative case.

Associativity is a grammatical category which expresses the meaning "X and the group (of one or more members) associated with X", where X is a nominal, typically of human reference. An example:

- Hungarian János-ék with plural suffix and meaning "John and associates / John and his group / John and them",
- Turkish Ahmet-ler with plural suffix and meaning "Ahmet and associates / Ahmet and his group / Ahmet and them",
- Japanese Tanaka-tachi with plural suffix and meaning "Tanaka and associates / Tanaka and his group / Tanaka and them".

Associations in English can be identified by words such as "with", or "along with". This is not to be confused with the instrumental case, which also can be translated into English as "with", but which expresses the notion of the means by which an action was done.
