= Tilichiki =

Selo in Olyutorsky District, Kamchatka Krai, Russia

Tilichiki Тиличики
- Selo
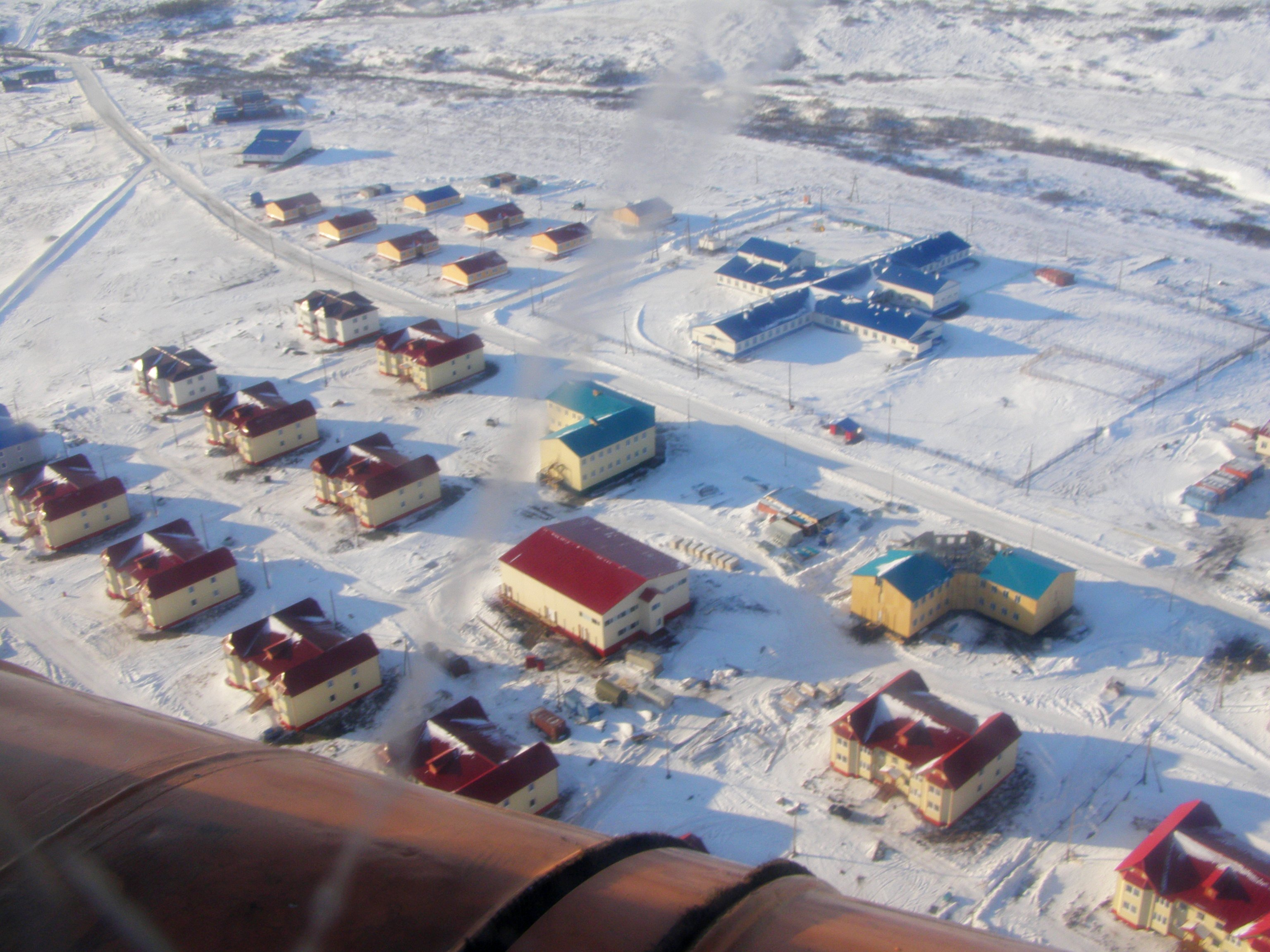
- Tilichiki after 2006 Kamchatka earthquake
- Interactive map of Tilichiki
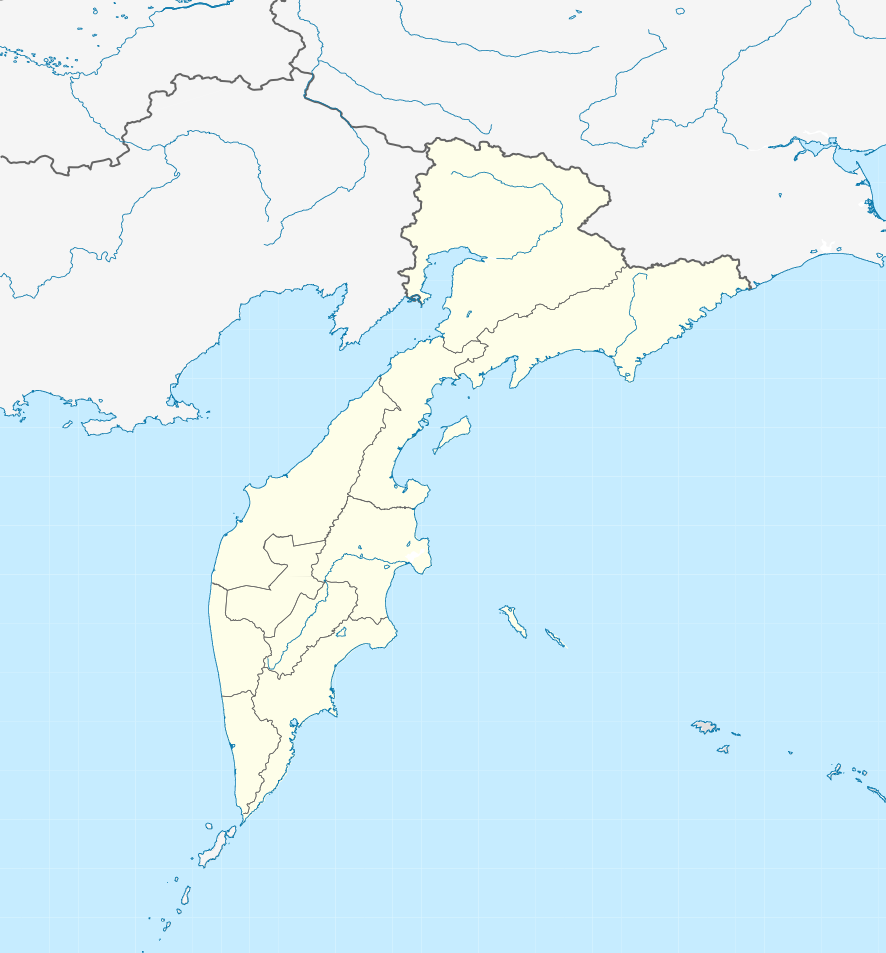
- Location of Tilichiki Tilichiki (Kamchatka Krai)
- Coordinates: 60°26′00″N 166°02′55″E
- Country: Russia
- Federal subject: Kamchatka Krai
- Administrative district: Olyutorsky District
- Founded: 1898

Population (2010 Census)
  - Total: 1,744
  - Estimate (2025): 1,600 (−8.3%)

Administrative status
  - Capital of: Olyutorsky District

Municipal status
  - Municipal district: Olyutorsky Municipal District
  - Rural settlement: Tilichiki Rural Settlement
  - Capital of: Tilichiki Rural Settlement
- Time zone: UTC+12 (MSK+9)
- Postal code: 688800
- Dialing code: +7 41544
- OKTMO ID: 30827405101

Tilichiki (Russian: Тили́чики) is a rural locality (a selo) and the administrative center of Olyutorsky District of Koryak Okrug of Kamchatka Krai, Russia. It is located on the Korfa Bay of the Kamchatka Peninsula.

== History ==
Tilichiki was established in 1898, and in 1930 it became the administrative center of the district. In April 2006, it was struck by a series of earthquakes which caused substantial damage. The first quake occurred on April 21 and had a moment magnitude of 7.6. The epicenter was nearly 90 kilometers (56 mi) to the northeast at a depth of 22 kilometers (14 mi) under mostly unpopulated areas. This was followed by several aftershocks, and on April 29 a further earth tremor with a magnitude of 6.6 was recorded. This was the strongest earthquake in the region for over a hundred years, and although there were no fatalities, three of the smaller localities were completely destroyed.

Tilichiki was re-built after the quake, as it is the most important populated place for more than 1,000 kilometers (620 mi) of coast between Anadyr in the north and Ust-Kamchatsk in the south.

== Geography and climate ==
Tilichiki lies in the northeast of the Kamchatka Peninsula, west of the Olyutor Range, on the shores of the Skrytaya Harbor, separated by a narrow spit from the northern part of the Korfa Bay in the Bering Sea.

In 1995, a large natural reserve of some 300,000 hectares (740,000 acres) was created.

Korf and Tilichiki have a subarctic climate (Köppen Dfc) though owing to their maritime location the winters are not so severe as at the same latitude in interior Siberia. As an illustration, the mean temperature of the coldest month is approximately 15 °C or 27 °F higher than in Olyokminsk at the same latitude near the Pole of Cold. Precipitation also shows the pronounced maritime influence, with annual averages being typical of Kamchatka and around three or four times those of interior Siberia at the same latitude. The heavier snow cover and milder winter temperatures mean that in spite of the mean temperature of the warmest month not reaching beyond +12.5 °C (54.5 °F), permafrost is only discontinuous. Strong winds, however, limit tree growth severely. Due to the cool ocean moderating winds from the interior, neither 30 °C (86 °F) nor −45 °C (−49 °F) have been measured, with the area having a much lower thermal oscillation than typical for the Russian Far East.

Climate data for Korf/Tilichiki (1979-1994)
Month	Jan	Feb	Mar	Apr	May	Jun	Jul	Aug	Sep	Oct	Nov	Dec	Year
Record high °C (°F)	6.1 (43.0)	7.2 (45.0)	7.2 (45.0)	10.0 (50.0)	17.2 (63.0)	28.9 (84.0)	28.9 (84.0)	25.0 (77.0)	21.1 (70.0)	12.2 (54.0)	10.0 (50.0)	7.2 (45.0)	28.9 (84.0)
Mean daily maximum °C (°F)	−9.4 (15.1)	−12.2 (10.0)	−8.9 (16.0)	−3.3 (26.1)	3.9 (39.0)	10.6 (51.1)	15.6 (60.1)	15.6 (60.1)	10.6 (51.1)	1.1 (34.0)	−6.1 (21.0)	−10.6 (12.9)	0.6 (33.1)
Daily mean °C (°F)	−13.1 (8.4)	−15.3 (4.5)	−12.5 (9.5)	−7 (19)	0.8 (33.4)	7.5 (45.5)	12.5 (54.5)	12.2 (54.0)	7.2 (45.0)	−1.9 (28.6)	−9.5 (14.9)	−14.2 (6.4)	−2.8 (27.0)
Mean daily minimum °C (°F)	−16.7 (1.9)	−18.3 (−0.9)	−16.1 (3.0)	−10.6 (12.9)	−2.2 (28.0)	4.4 (39.9)	9.4 (48.9)	8.9 (48.0)	3.9 (39.0)	−5 (23)	−12.8 (9.0)	−17.8 (0.0)	−6.1 (21.0)
Record low °C (°F)	−42.2 (−44.0)	−43.9 (−47.0)	−37.8 (−36.0)	−30 (−22)	−17.8 (0.0)	−2.8 (27.0)	2.2 (36.0)	0.0 (32.0)	−5 (23)	−18.9 (−2.0)	−31.1 (−24.0)	−37.8 (−36.0)	−43.9 (−47.0)
Average precipitation mm (inches)	59.7 (2.35)	37.1 (1.46)	52.3 (2.06)	62.0 (2.44)	71.6 (2.82)	56.4 (2.22)	100.4 (3.95)	105.9 (4.17)	79.3 (3.12)	75.4 (2.97)	84.1 (3.31)	92.0 (3.62)	876.2 (34.49)
Average precipitation days (≥ 1.0 mm)	6.7	5.5	4.8	4.5	5.2	5.2	8.8	10.0	7.5	7.5	7.1	6.4	79.2
Mean monthly sunshine hours	58.9	104.5	186.0	219.0	210.8	216.0	189.1	176.7	150.0	117.8	66.0	27.9	1,722.7
Source 1: Sistema de Clasificación Bioclimática Mundial
Source 2: allmetsat.com (sunshine only)

== Economy and infrastructure ==
Industries include fishing and potato and vegetable farming, sometimes in greenhouses.

=== Transportation ===
The Tilichiki Airport is located to the south of Tilichiki, and it is also connected by ferry service to the port of Korf.
