= Circles of latitude between the 55th parallel north and the 60th parallel north =

Circles of latitude

Following are circles of latitude between the 55th parallel north and the 60th parallel north:

== 56th parallel north ==
56th parallel north (interactive map)

The 56th parallel north is a circle of latitude that is 56 degrees north of the Earth's equatorial plane. It crosses Europe, Asia, the Pacific Ocean, North America, and the Atlantic Ocean.

At this latitude the sun is visible for 17 hours, 37 minutes during the summer solstice and 6 hours, 57 minutes during the winter solstice.

=== Around the world ===
Starting at the Prime Meridian and heading eastwards, the parallel 56° north passes through:

Coordinates	Country, territory or sea	Notes
56°0′N 0°0′E	North Sea	
56°0′N 8°7′E	Denmark	Jutland (mainland)
56°0′N 10°17′E	Kattegat	
56°0′N 10°33′E	Denmark	Island of Samsø, passing through the northern tip for about 400 meters
56°0′N 10°33′E	Kattegat	
56°0′N 11°55′E	Denmark	Island of Sjælland, passing just south of Helsingør
56°0′N 12°35′E	Øresund	
56°0′N 12°43′E	Sweden	Scania, passing just south of Helsingborg
56°0′N 14°27′E	Hanöbukten	
56°0′N 14°37′E	Sweden	Blekinge
56°0′N 14°44′E	Baltic Sea	
56°0′N 21°4′E	Lithuania	Klaipėda County
56°0′N 25°52′E	Latvia	Passing just north of Daugavpils
56°0′N 27°49′E	Belarus	Vitebsk Region
56°0′N 28°43′E	Russia	For about 13 km
56°0′N 28°55′E	Belarus	For about 17 km
56°0′N 29°12′E	Russia	Passing just north of Moscow
56°0′N 137°25′E	Sea of Okhotsk	
56°0′N 155°40′E	Russia	Kamchatka Peninsula
56°0′N 162°5′E	Bering Sea	
56°0′N 160°34′W	United States	Alaska - the Alaska Peninsula
56°0′N 158°25′W	Pacific Ocean	Gulf of Alaska - passing just south of the Semidi Islands, and just north of Chirikof Island, Alaska, United States; Passing just south of Kuiu Island, Alaska, United States
56°0′N 133°35′W	United States	Alaska - Kosciusko Island, Prince of Wales Island, Etolin Island and the Alaska Panhandle
56°0′N 130°1′W	Canada	British Columbia - passing 2.5 km south of Hudson's Hope; Alberta; Saskatchewan; Manitoba - passing just North of Thompson; Ontario - passing just north of Fort Severn
56°0′N 87°26′W	Hudson Bay	
56°0′N 79°53′W	Canada	Nunavut - Flaherty Island and Innetalling Island
56°0′N 78°59′W	Hudson Bay	
56°0′N 76°46′W	Canada	Quebec; Newfoundland and Labrador
56°0′N 60°49′W	Atlantic Ocean	
56°0′N 6°0′W	United Kingdom	Scotland - Island of Jura
56°0′N 5°48′W	Sound of Jura	
56°0′N 5°41′W	United Kingdom	Scotland, passing through Helensburgh and then Falkirk town centre
56°0′N 3°21′W	Firth of Forth	Passing through the Forth Bridge, and just north of Edinburgh
56°0′N 2°53′W	United Kingdom	Scotland, passing through Dunbar
56°0′N 2°30′W	North Sea	

== 57th parallel north ==
57th parallel north (interactive map)

The 57th parallel north is a circle of latitude that is 57 degrees north of the Earth's equatorial plane. It crosses Europe, Asia, the Pacific Ocean, North America, and the Atlantic Ocean.

At this latitude the sun is visible for 17 hours, 53 minutes during the summer solstice and 6 hours, 43 minutes during the winter solstice. On June 21, the sun is at 56.44 degrees in the sky and on December 21, the sun is at 9.56 degrees in the sky. During the summer solstice, nighttime does not get beyond nautical twilight, a condition which lasts throughout the month of June. It is possible to view both astronomical dawn and dusk every day of the month of April.

The maximum altitude of the Sun is > 18.00º in October and > 11.00º in November.

The only capital city on the 57th parallel north is Riga.

=== Around the world ===
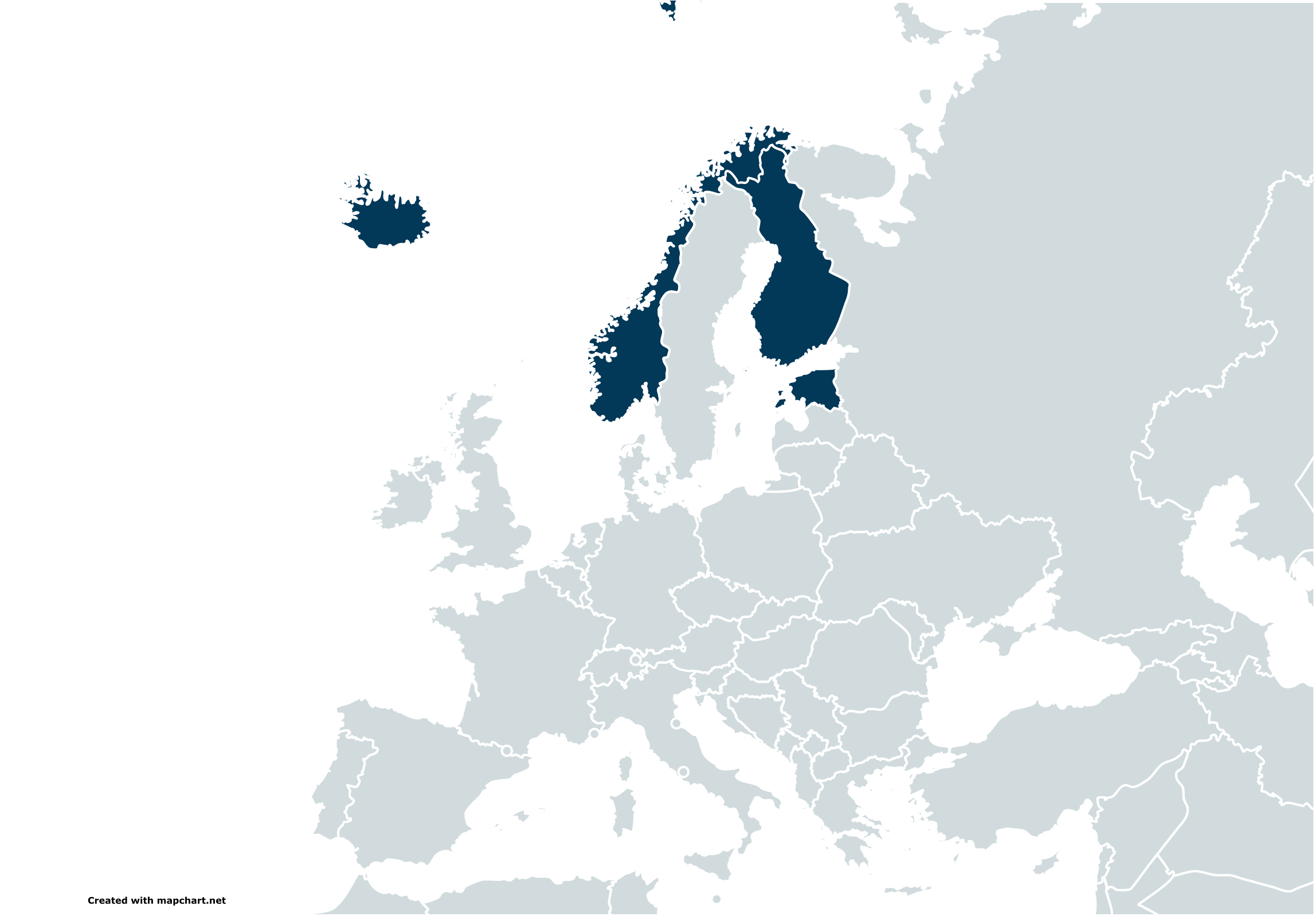
European countries entirely north of 57° N

Starting at the Prime Meridian and heading eastwards, the parallel 57° north passes through:

Coordinates	Country, territory or ocean	Notes
57°0′N 0°0′E	Atlantic Ocean	North Sea
57°0′N 8°26′E	Denmark	North Jutlandic Island and Jutland mainland
57°0′N 10°21′E	Atlantic Ocean	Kattegat
57°0′N 12°21′E	Sweden	Halland, Jönköping, Kronoberg and Kalmar counties
57°0′N 16°32′E	Atlantic Ocean	Kalmar Strait, Baltic Sea
57°0′N 16°47′E	Sweden	Island of Öland
57°0′N 16°55′E	Atlantic Ocean	Baltic Sea
57°0′N 18°13′E	Sweden	Island of Gotland
57°0′N 18°24′E	Atlantic Ocean	Baltic Sea
57°0′N 21°22′E	Latvia	Courland, Semigallia
57°0′N 23°32′E	Atlantic Ocean	Gulf of Riga, Baltic Sea
57°0′N 23°54′E	Latvia	Passing through Riga. Vidzeme, Latgale
57°0′N 27°43′E	Russia	Passing through Ivanovo
57°0′N 138°45′E	Pacific Ocean	Sea of Okhotsk
57°0′N 156°31′E	Russia	Kamchatka Peninsula
57°0′N 162°51′E	Pacific Ocean	Bering Sea; Passing just south of Otter Island and Saint Paul Island, Alaska, United States
57°0′N 158°40′W	United States	Alaska - Alaska Peninsula
57°0′N 156°33′W	Pacific Ocean	Gulf of Alaska
57°0′N 154°32′W	United States	Alaska - Kodiak Island and Sitkalidak Island
57°0′N 153°17′W	Pacific Ocean	Gulf of Alaska
57°0′N 135°50′W	United States	Alaska - Kruzof Island
57°0′N 135°45′W	Pacific Ocean	Sitka Sound
57°0′N 135°15′W	United States	Alaska - Baranof Island
57°0′N 134°43′W	Pacific Ocean	Chatham Strait; Passing just south of Admiralty Island, Alaska, United States
57°0′N 134°30′W	Pacific Ocean	Frederick Sound
57°0′N 134°0′W	United States	Alaska - Kupreanof Island and the Alaska Panhandle
57°0′N 132°3′W	Canada	British Columbia, Alberta, Saskatchewan, Manitoba
57°0′N 89°54′W	Arctic Ocean	Hudson Bay; Passing just north of the Belcher Islands, Nunavut, Canada
57°0′N 76°42′W	Canada	Nunavut, Quebec, Newfoundland and Labrador
57°0′N 61°22′W	Atlantic Ocean	
57°0′N 7°31′W	United Kingdom	Island of Barra, Scotland
57°0′N 7°22′W	Atlantic Ocean	Sea of the Hebrides
57°0′N 6°27′W	United Kingdom	Island of Rùm, Scotland
57°0′N 6°15′W	Atlantic Ocean	Sea of the Hebrides
57°0′N 5°50′W	United Kingdom	Scotland
57°0′N 2°10′W	Atlantic Ocean	North Sea

== 58th parallel north ==
58th parallel north (interactive map)

The 58th parallel north is a circle of latitude that is 58 degrees north of the Earth's equatorial plane. It crosses Europe, Asia, the Pacific Ocean, North America, and the Atlantic Ocean.

At this latitude the Sun is visible for 18 hours, 11 minutes during the summer solstice and 6 hours, 27 minutes during the winter solstice.

=== Around the world ===
Starting at the Prime Meridian and heading eastwards, the parallel 58° north passes through:

Coordinates	Country, territory or ocean	Notes
58°0′N 0°0′E	North Sea	
58°0′N 6°59′E	Norway	Markøy and Austre Seli, Agder
58°0′N 7°0′E	Atlantic Ocean	North Sea
58°0′N 7°2′E	Norway	Lindesnes peninsula, Agder; Passing 2.3 km (1.4 mi) north of mainland Norway's southernmost point
58°0′N 7°6′E	Atlantic Ocean	Skagerrak Passing between Våre Island to the north and Udvåre Island to the south, Vest-Agder
58°0′N 7°20′E	Norway	Hille Island, Agder
58°0′N 7°23′E	Atlantic Ocean	Skagerrak
58°0′N 7°30′E	Norway	Skjernøya Island, Agder
58°0′N 7°32′E	Atlantic Ocean	Skagerrak Passing south of Uvår and Songvår Islands, Agder
58°0′N 11°32′E	Sweden	Tjörn Island, Västra Götaland County
58°0′N 11°45′E	Atlantic Ocean	Hakefjorden
58°0′N 11°49′E	Sweden	Västra Götaland County, Lake Vättern (southernmost point of Visingsö), Jönköping County, Östergötland County, Kalmar County
58°0′N 16°47′E	Atlantic Ocean	Baltic Sea; Passing just north of the islands of Gotland and Fårö, Sweden
58°0′N 22°1′E	Estonia	Island of Saaremaa, Saare County
58°0′N 22°11′E	Atlantic Ocean	Gulf of Riga, Baltic Sea
58°0′N 24°25′E	Estonia	Pärnu County
58°0′N 24°55′E	Latvia	For 19.8 km (12.3 mi), Valmiera district
58°0′N 25°15′E	Estonia	For 2.7 km (1.7 mi), Viljandi County
58°0′N 25°18′E	Latvia	For 8.6 km (5.3 mi), Valmiera district
58°0′N 25°27′E	Estonia	Viljandi County, Valga County and Põlva County
58°0′N 27°41′E	Russia	Northwestern, Central, Volga, Ural Federal Districts, Krasnoyarsk Krai, Irkutsk Oblast, Zabaykalsky Krai, Zabaykalsky Krai, Yakutia, Khabarovsk Krai; Passing through Perm and Ust-Ilimsk
58°0′N 140°33′E	Pacific Ocean	Sea of Okhotsk
58°0′N 157°40′E	Russia	Kamchatka Peninsula, Kamchatka Krai
58°0′N 161°59′E	Pacific Ocean	Bering Sea
58°0′N 157°37′W	United States	Alaska - Alaska Peninsula
58°0′N 155°2′W	Pacific Ocean	Shelikof Strait, Gulf of Alaska
58°0′N 153°5′W	United States	Alaska - Raspberry Island and Afognak Island
58°0′N 152°47′W	Pacific Ocean	Gulf of Alaska
58°0′N 136°31′W	United States	Alaska - Yakobi Island, Chichagof Island, Admiralty Island and the mainland
58°0′N 133°3′W	Canada	British Columbia, Alberta, Saskatchewan, Manitoba
58°0′N 92°49′W	Arctic Ocean	Hudson Bay
58°0′N 77°12′W	Canada	Quebec, Newfoundland and Labrador
58°0′N 62°9′W	Atlantic Ocean	
58°0′N 7°6′W	United Kingdom	Island of Lewis and Harris, Scotland
58°0′N 6°23′W	The Minch	
58°0′N 5°19′W	United Kingdom	Scotland
58°0′N 3°52′W	North Sea	

=== Climate ===
In general, this parallel sees significant differences in temperature and precipitation with proximity to warm ocean currents. The moderation from the Gulf Stream ensures a moderate oceanic climate in much of Western Europe and on the immediate coastline of Alaska, whereas moving inland on continental masses, subarctic climates predominate as the dark winters dominate the temperature cycle. In the transitional area centred on the Baltic Sea this latitude sees a humid continental climate with warm summers and snowy winters somewhat below freezing.

Where cold ocean currents dominate such as near Hudson Bay the climate is polar, rendering in severe winter conditions and very subdued summers. This type of climate is seen in the surroundings of Inukjuak in Quebec, Canada, where the sea ice eliminates winter moderation, but the thawing of the cold water renders in very cool summers as well. In more continental cold areas such as these winters commonly go below −30 °C or −22 °F even during the day. Further west in inland areas winters are often as severe, but summers average above 22 °C or 71.6 °F, similar to the Baltic region where climates are much gentler.

== 59th parallel north ==
59th parallel north (interactive map)

The 59th parallel north is a circle of latitude that is 59 degrees north of the Earth's equatorial plane. It crosses Europe, Asia, the Pacific Ocean, North America, and the Atlantic Ocean.

At this latitude the Sun is visible for 18 hours, 30 minutes during the summer solstice and 6 hours, 11 minutes during the winter solstice.

If latitude in northern hemisphere is 59°45′ or smaller, every day in August can view both nautical dawn and nautical dusk.

=== Around the world ===
Starting at the Prime Meridian and heading eastwards, the parallel 59° north passes through:

Coordinates	Country, territory or oceans	Notes
59°0′N 0°0′E	Atlantic Ocean	North Sea
59°0′N 5°34′E	Norway	Jæren, Rogaland
59°0′N 5°40′E	Atlantic Ocean	Byfjorden, Boknafjorden
59°0′N 5°34′E	Norway	Hundvåg and Vassøy Islands, Rogaland
59°0′N 5°48′E	Atlantic Ocean	Idsefjorden, Boknafjorden
59°0′N 6°4′E	Norway	Rogaland, Agder, Telemark
59°0′N 9°45′E	Atlantic Ocean	Langesundsfjorden, Skagerrak; Passing over Langøya, Geiterøya, Store Arøya and Stokkøya islands
59°0′N 9°51′E	Norway	Vestfold
59°0′N 10°3′E	Atlantic Ocean	Skagerrak; Passing south of Ferder lighthouse and Oslofjorden
59°0′N 11°2′E	Norway	Andholmen and Søndre Sandøy, Hvaler islands, Østfold
59°0′N 10°3′E	Atlantic Ocean	Sekken sound, Skagerrak for 1.9 km
59°0′N 11°7′E	Sweden	Strömstad Municipality, Västra Götaland County for 19 km
59°0′N 11°27′E	Atlantic Ocean	Iddefjord, Skagerrak for 1 km
59°0′N 11°28′E	Norway	Halden Municipality for 13.6 km
59°0′N 11°42′E	Sweden	Västra Götaland County, Lake Vänern, Värmland County, Örebro County, Södermanland County, Stockholm County
59°0′N 18°12′E	Atlantic Ocean	Baltic Sea
59°0′N 22°30′E	Estonia	Island of Hiiumaa
59°0′N 22°52′E	Atlantic Ocean	Baltic Sea
59°0′N 23°8′E	Estonia	Island of Vormsi and the mainland. Passing through Lake Peipus
59°0′N 27°44′E	Russia	Passing through Rybinsk Reservoir
59°0′N 142°2′E	Pacific Ocean	Sea of Okhotsk
59°0′N 150°29′E	Russia	Zavyalov Island
59°0′N 150°36′E	Pacific Ocean	Sea of Okhotsk
59°0′N 151°14′E	Russia	
59°0′N 152°57′E	Pacific Ocean	Sea of Okhotsk
59°0′N 159°44′E	Russia	Kamchatka Peninsula
59°0′N 163°5′E	Pacific Ocean	Litke Strait, Bering Sea
59°0′N 163°54′E	Russia	Karaginsky Island
59°0′N 164°43′E	Pacific Ocean	Bering Sea
59°0′N 161°49′W	United States	Alaska
59°0′N 153°36′W	Pacific Ocean	Gulf of Alaska - passing just north of the Barren Islands
59°0′N 138°10′W	United States	Alaska
59°0′N 137°30′W	Canada	British Columbia - for about 13 km (8.1 mi)
59°0′N 137°16′W	United States	Alaska
59°0′N 134°24′W	Canada	British Columbia, Alberta, Saskatchewan, Manitoba (not far north of Churchill).
59°0′N 94°43′W	Arctic Ocean	Hudson Bay; Passing just south of the Ottawa Islands, Nunavut, Canada
59°0′N 78°21′W	Canada	Nunavut, Quebec
59°0′N 68°58′W	Arctic Ocean	Ungava Bay
59°0′N 65°54′W	Canada	Nunavut, Quebec, Newfoundland and Labrador
59°0′N 63°13′W	Atlantic Ocean	
59°0′N 3°22′W	United Kingdom	Mainland, Orkney, Scotland
59°0′N 2°55′W	Arctic Ocean	North Sea

=== Notable cities and towns on 59°N ===
- Stockholm, Stockholm County, Sweden
- Tallinn, Harju County, Estonia
- Magadan, Magadan Oblast, Russia

== 60th parallel north ==
60th parallel north (interactive map)

The 60th parallel north in Canada, marking the southern borders of Yukon, Northwest Territories, and the Nunavut mainland.

The 60th parallel north is a circle of latitude that is 60 degrees north of Earth's equator. It crosses Europe, Asia, the Pacific Ocean, North America, and the Atlantic Ocean.

In Canada, the 60th parallel forms the southern mainland boundary of the northern territories of Yukon, Northwest Territories, and Nunavut with the western provinces of British Columbia, Alberta, Saskatchewan, and Manitoba. Accordingly, "north of 60" is an expression often used for the territories. The 60th Parallel Territorial Park is on Mackenzie Highway between Alberta and Northwest Territories and it has a visitor centre there in the homeland of the Yellowknives Dene First Nation and the North Slave Métis Alliance.

Between 1776 and 1950, the 60th parallel formed the southern limit of the Royal Greenland Trade Department's exclusive monopoly on trade near the Dano-Norwegian and later Danish colonies of Greenland (1776–1782) and South Greenland (1782–1950).

Although it lies approximately twice as far away from the Equator as from the North Pole, the 60th parallel is half as long as the Equator line, due to the cosine of 60 degrees being 0.5. This is where the Earth bulges halfway as much as on the Equator.

At this latitude, the Sun is visible for 18 hours, 52 minutes during the June solstice and 5 hours, 52 minutes during the December solstice. The maximum altitude of the Sun is 53.44° on 21 June and 6.56° on 21 December. The maximum altitude of the Sun is > 15.00º in October and > 8.00º in November.

The lowest latitude where white nights can be observed is approximately on this parallel.

During the summer solstice, nighttime does not get beyond nautical twilight, a condition which lasts throughout the month of June. It is possible to view both astronomical dawn and dusk every day between August 22 and April 21.

=== Around the world ===
Malachy Tallack wrote a book, Sixty Degrees North: Around the World in Search of Home, about his travels along the general line of the parallel, starting and finishing at Shetland.

Starting at the Prime Meridian and heading eastwards, the parallel 60° north passes through:

Coordinates	Country, territory or ocean	Notes
60°0′N 0°0′E	Atlantic Ocean	North Sea
60°0′N 5°3′E	Norway	Islands of Stolmen and Selbjørn, Vestland
60°0′N 5°12′E	Atlantic Ocean	Bekkjarviksundet, Selbjørnsfjorden, North Sea
60°0′N 5°15′E	Norway	Island of Huftarøy, Vestland
60°0′N 5°17′E	Atlantic Ocean	Langenuen, North Sea
60°0′N 5°22′E	Norway	Islands of Reksteren and Tysnesøya, plus the mainland of Vestland
60°0′N 5°52′E	Atlantic Ocean	Hardangerfjorden, North Sea
60°0′N 5°59′E	Norway	Mainland: Folgefonna glacier, Telemark, Buskerud, Akershus, Oslo, Innlandet, Østfold; Passing just north of the capital Oslo
60°0′N 12°23′E	Sweden	Passing through Fagersta; Passing just north of Uppsala
60°0′N 18°53′E	Atlantic Ocean	Baltic Sea
60°0′N 20°8′E	Finland	Högskär, Bäckö and several smaller islands, Åland Islands
60°0′N 20°58′E	Atlantic Ocean	Baltic Sea
60°0′N 23°30′E	Finland	Passing through Ekenäs
60°0′N 23°58′E	Atlantic Ocean	Baltic Sea
60°0′N 24°26′E	Finland	Porkkala peninsula
60°0′N 24°30′E	Atlantic Ocean	Baltic Sea, Gulf of Finland; Passing just south of Helsinki, Finland and the island of Gogland, Russia
60°0′N 27°48′E	Russia	Moshchny Island
60°0′N 27°54′E	Atlantic Ocean	Gulf of Finland, Baltic Sea
60°0′N 29°44′E	Russia	Island of Kotlin (city of Kronstadt)
60°0′N 29°47′E	Atlantic Ocean	Gulf of Finland, Baltic Sea
60°0′N 30°5′E	Russia	Passing through Saint Petersburg, Lake Ladoga
60°0′N 154°30′E	Pacific Ocean	Shelikhov Gulf, Sea of Okhotsk
60°0′N 161°28′E	Russia	Kamchatka Peninsula
60°0′N 165°14′E	Pacific Ocean	Bering Sea
60°0′N 166°10′E	Russia	Pylgin Range
60°0′N 166°33′E	Pacific Ocean	Olyutor Gulf, Bering Sea
60°0′N 170°9′E	Russia	Olyutor Peninsula
60°0′N 170°26′E	Pacific Ocean	Bering Sea
60°0′N 167°8′W	United States	Alaska - Nunivak Island
60°0′N 165°39′W	Pacific Ocean	Etolin Strait, Bering Sea
60°0′N 164°9′W	United States	Alaska
60°0′N 152°38′W	Pacific Ocean	Cook Inlet, Gulf of Alaska
60°0′N 151°44′W	United States	Alaska - Kenai Peninsula, Evans Island, Elrington Island, Latouche Island and Montague Island
60°0′N 147°24′W	Pacific Ocean	Gulf of Alaska
60°0′N 144°24′W	United States	Alaska - Wingham Island, Kayak Island and a small section of mainland
60°0′N 143°50′W	Pacific Ocean	Gulf of Alaska
60°0′N 141°53′W	United States	Alaska
60°0′N 139°3′W	Canada	Yukon / British Columbia border Northwest Territories / British Columbia border Northwest Territories / Alberta border - passes through Wood Buffalo National Park and beside Fort Smith, NT; Northwest Territories / Saskatchewan border Nunavut / Manitoba border
60°0′N 94°49′W	Arctic Ocean	Hudson Bay; Passing just north of the Ottawa Islands, Nunavut, Canada
60°0′N 77°17′W	Canada	Quebec; Passing just south of Puvirnituq, Quebec
60°0′N 69°46′W	Arctic Ocean	Ungava Bay; Passing just south of Kangirsuk, Quebec, Canada
60°0′N 65°7′W	Canada	Quebec, Newfoundland and Labrador
60°0′N 64°9′W	Atlantic Ocean	Border between the Davis Strait (to the north) and the Labrador Sea (to the south)
60°0′N 44°52′W	Greenland	Passing south of Narsaq; crossing mainland at Narsarmijit; going through Cape Farewell Archipelago, passing just north of Itilleq Island
60°0′N 43°9′W	Atlantic Ocean	
60°0′N 1°21′W	United Kingdom	Islands of Mainland and Mousa, Shetland Islands, Scotland
60°0′N 1°11′W	Atlantic Ocean	North Sea

=== Notable cities and towns on 60°N ===
- Whitehorse, Yukon, Canada
- Fort Smith, Northwest Territories, Canada
- Bergen, Vestland, Norway
- Oslo, Norway
- Helsinki, Uusimaa, Finland
- Espoo, Uusimaa, Finland
- Saint Petersburg, Russia

== See also ==
- Circles of latitude between the 50th parallel north and the 55th parallel north
- Circles of latitude between the 60th parallel north and the 65th parallel north
