= Olyutor Gulf =

Bay in the Bering Sea, Russia

- Олюторский залив
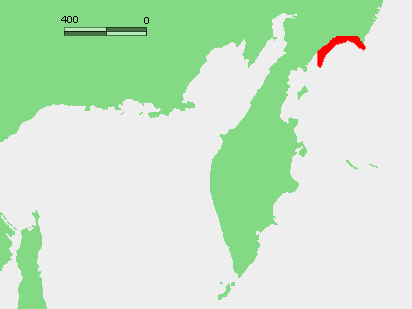
- Location

- Location in Kamchatka Krai
- Location: Russian Far East
- Coordinates: 60°14′N 168°21′E
- River sources: Pakhacha
- Ocean/sea sources: Bering Sea
- Basin countries: Russia
- Max. length: 83 kilometres (52 mi)
- Max. width: 228 kilometres (142 mi)
- Average depth: 1,000 metres (3,281 ft)
- Settlements: Tilichiki

The Olyutor Bay (Russian: Олюторский залив) is a gulf or bay of the Bering Sea in Olyutorsky District, northern part of Kamchatka Krai, Russia.

== Geography ==
It is bounded on the west by the Govena Peninsula which separates it from Korfa Bay and on the east by the Olyutor Peninsula, the southern part of the Olyutor Range. Beyond Cape Olyutor lies the Bering Sea.

It extends roughly 83 kilometres (52 mi) inland and is 228 kilometres (142 mi) at its widest. The deepest spot is about 1,000 metres (3,281 ft). The western shore is dominated by the Pylgin Range, which has a maximum elevation of 1,357 metres (4,452 ft). The bay is normally covered by fast ice from December to May. It has a large tidal range of up to 1.9 metres (6 ft).

== See also ==
- Shirshov Ridge
