= North Slave Métis Alliance =

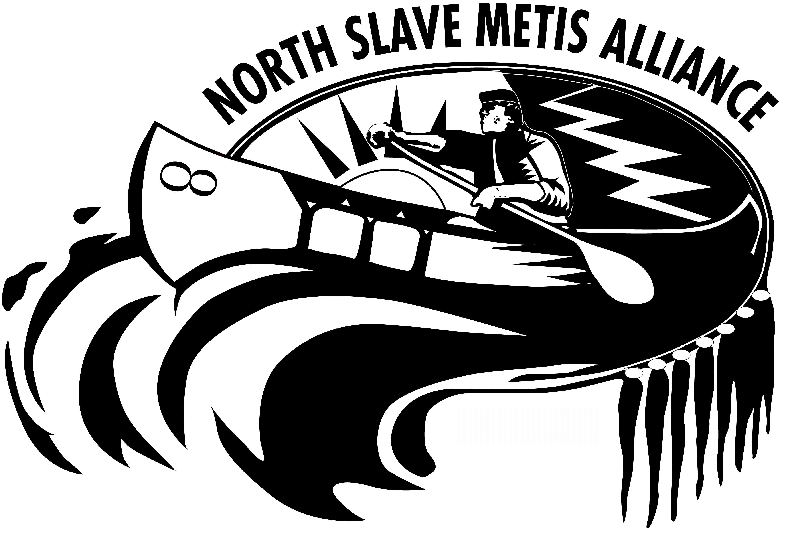
- Founded: 1996
- Type: Non-profit
- Purpose: Unite the membership of the community of Indigenous Métis of the North Slave Region area of the Northwest Territories
- Location: Yellowknife, Northwest Territories, Canada
- Region served: Northwest Territories
- Key people: Marc Whitford (current President)
- Website: http://www.nsma.net/

The North Slave Métis Alliance is a non-profit society that represents the Indigenous rights-bearing Métis people of the Northwest Territories, who primarily exercise their Indigenous rights north and east of Great Slave Lake. The NSMA’s mandate includes: The assertion, protection, and implementation of the Indigenous rights of the North Slave Métis People; and the exercise of Métis responsibility to protect the environment and to promote and enhance Métis education, economic, social, and cultural development. The NSMA is vitally concerned with the protection, preservation, and sustainable use of its traditional lands and resources. With that in mind, the NSMA is committed to principles of economic sustainability, environmental stewardship, and self-determination in respect to its traditional lands and resources.

The North Slave Métis Alliance (NSMA) has been registered as a non-profit society in the Northwest Territories since 1996. The organization exists for the stated purpose of negotiating a regionally based comprehensive claim centred in the North Slave Region of the Northwest Territories. Prior to 1996, their members were represented in the 1975-1990 Dene-Métis Comprehensive Claim negotiation process by the Métis Nation of the Northwest Territories (MNNWT), which was formed in 1972 to represent all Indigenous Métis in the Northwest Territories. This organisation was disbanded after the Final Agreement was rejected, and the pan-territorial process was abandoned in favor of the pursuit of regional claims. The North Slave Métis Alliance was endorsed by the MNNWT as the North Slave Métis regional land claim organisation before the MNNWT was disbanded. The alliance represents Métis in Yellowknife, Behchokǫ̀ (Rae-Edzo), Whatì, Gamèti (Rae Lakes), and Wekweeti (Snare Lake). The NSMA sponsors a number of local events, such as the annual Aboriginal Day celebration in downtown Yellowknife, which includes a parade, fish fry, and musical performances near city hall.

In 2013, the NSMA won its caribou harvest lawsuit against the government of the Northwest Territories in the Supreme Court of the Northwest Territories. The court found that the government of the Northwest Territories had an obligation to consult and accommodate the NSMA and failed in its obligation as a Crown actor. The court recognized that the members of the NSMA hold Indigenous rights over their traditional lands.

== Leadership ==
NSMA presidents serve a four-year term. The successive presidents of the NSMA have been:

President	From	To
Marc Whitford	June 2023	Present
William (Bill) Enge	November 2004	2023
Robert "Sholto" Douglas	April 2003	November 2003
Bob Turner	December 2002	2003
Clem Paul	1996	2002

== History of the North Slave Métis people ==
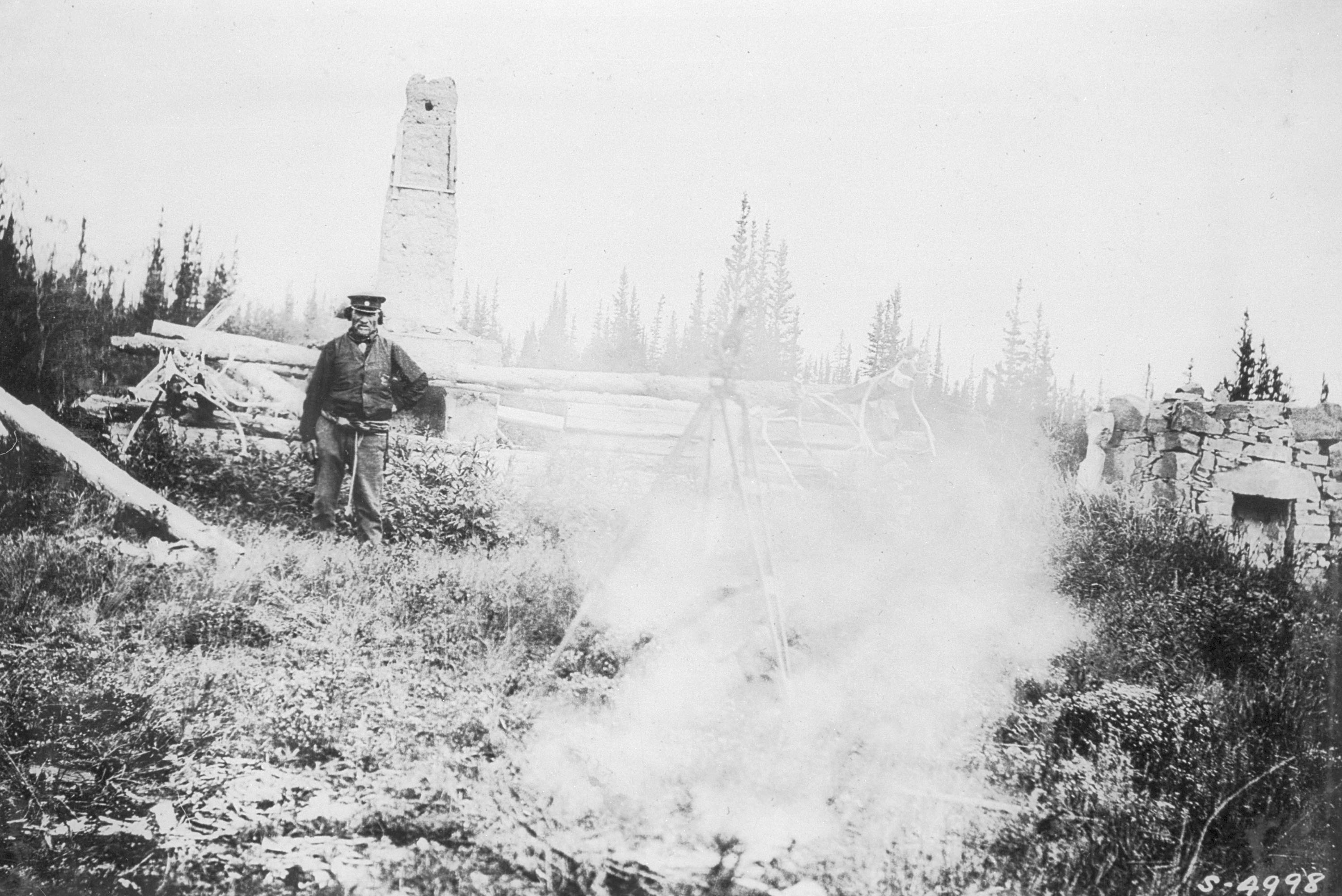
Sousi Beaulieu wearing a traditional ceinture fléchée (Métis sash)

The North Slave Métis have continuously used and occupied the territory north and east of Great Slave Lake since the mid-18th century. By the early-19th century, the North Slave Métis community in the Great Slave Lake area was distinct from other Indigenous groups. Outsiders easily identified them, largely because of their occupation and employment patterns. They were "prized as fur-trade employees for their language ability, skills in living on the land, and influence in the Indian populations". North Slave Métis people tended to be highly mobile and have a regional consciousness. Communities were characterized by a regional network within which there would be certain fixed settlements, connected by transportation systems of river routes, cart trails, and portages along which people settled. Their traditional territory followed hunting, trapping, and trading trails north to the Great Bear Lake and east into what is now Nunavut. Historic North Slave Métis settlements, such as Old Fort Rae, Lac La Martre, Yellowknife River, Old Fort Providence, Fort Resolution, Beaulieu Fort (now known as Łutselk'e), and Fort Reliance, existed before European powers established effective political and legal control over the geographic area.

=== Notable North Slave Métis ===
- François Beaulieu II (1771 - † Nov 1872)- Beaulieu II was one of the "founding fathers" of the Great Slave Lake area Métis. The Beaulieu family was already established in the region when the European fur trade first arrived and took up residency in the area. Beaulieu and his family inhabited many regions of the north, demonstrating the regional nature of the Métis.
