= List of protected areas of the Northwest Territories =

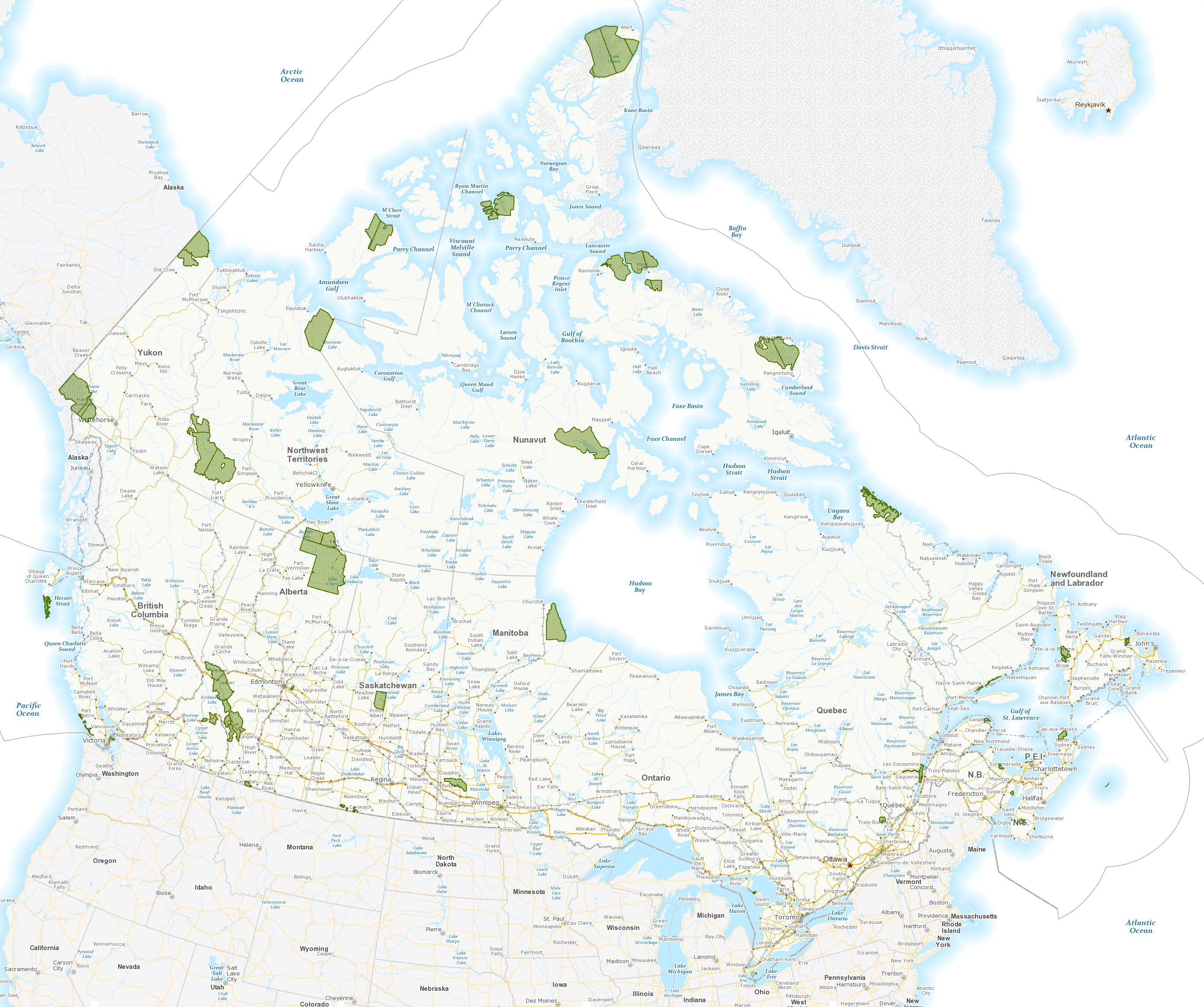
Canada's National Parks and National Reserves by provinces and territories

This is a list of protected areas of the Northwest Territories in Canada.

== National parks ==
- Aulavik National Park
- Nahanni National Park Reserve
- Nááts'ihch'oh National Park Reserve
- Pingo Canadian Landmark
- Thaidene Nëné National Park Reserve
- Tuktut Nogait National Park
- Wood Buffalo National Park (In Alberta also)

== Territorial parks ==
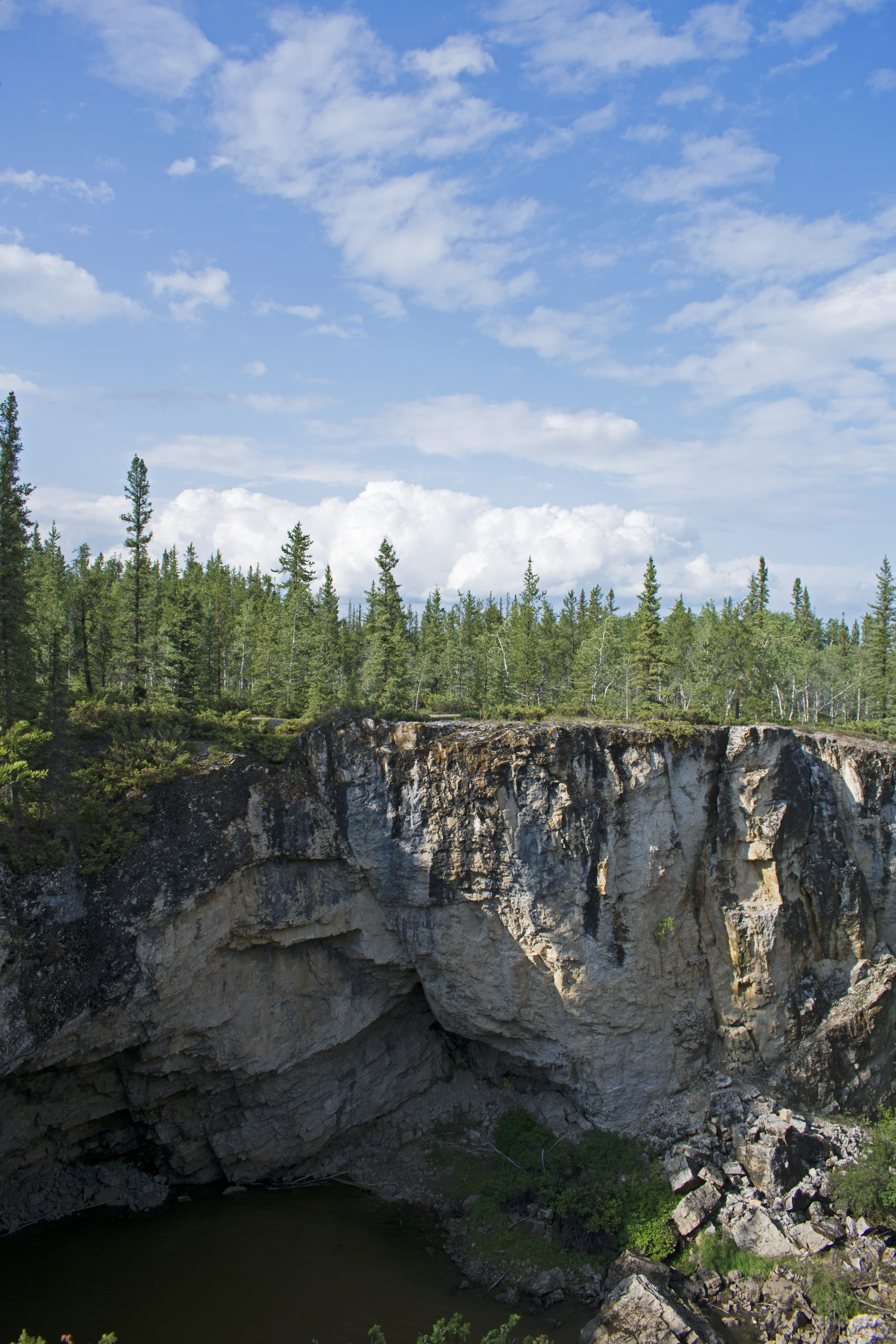
The rock above the waterfall in McNallie Creek Territorial Park

== Indigenous protected and conserved areas ==
=== Dehcho Region ===
- Edéhzhíe Protected Area

== Other ==
- Thelon Wildlife Sanctuary

== See also ==
- List of territorial parks in the Northwest Territories
- List of Canadian protected areas
- List of national parks of Canada
