= 2006 Kamchatka earthquake =

M 7.6 earthquake in Russia

2006 Kamchatka earthquakes
- Location within Far Eastern Federal District
- UTC time: 2006-04-20 23:25:02
- ISC event: 10697894
- USGS-ANSS: ComCat
- Local date: April 21, 2006
- Local time: 12:25:02
- Magnitude: 7.6 M_{w}
- Depth: 22.4 km (14 mi)
- Epicenter: 60.91°N 167.12°E
- Type: Dip-slip
- Areas affected: Russia
- Total damage: $55 million
- Max. intensity: MMI X (Extreme)
- Aftershocks: 6.6 M_{w} Apr 29 at 16:58; 6.6 M_{w} May 22 at 11:12
- Casualties: 40 injured

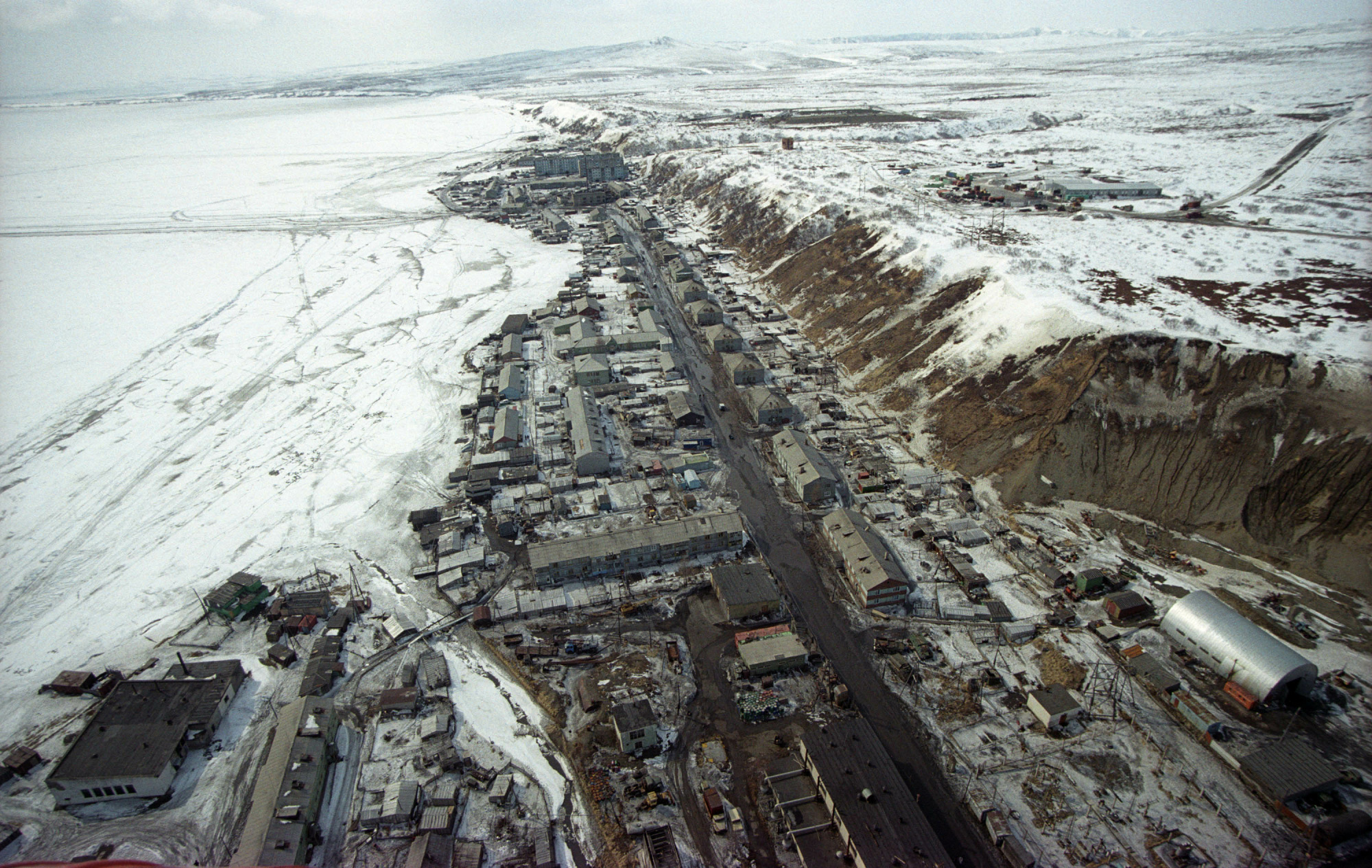
2006 Koryakia earthquake

The 2006 Kamchatka earthquake occurred on April 21, 2006 at 12:25 PM local time. This shock had a moment magnitude of 7.6 and a maximum Mercalli intensity of X (Extreme). The hypocenter was located near the coast of Koryak Autonomous Okrug at an estimated depth of 22 km, as reported by the International Seismological Centre. This event caused damage in three villages and was followed by a number of large aftershocks. Two M6.6 earthquakes struck on April 29 at 16:58 UTC and again on May 22 at 11:12 UTC. These earthquakes caused no deaths; however, 40 people were reported injured.

== Tectonic setting ==
The northern part of the Kamchatka Peninsula lies away from the convergent boundaries of the Kuril–Kamchatka Trench and the Aleutian Trench but across the boundary between two blocks within the North American plate, the Kolyma-Chukotka and Bering Sea microplates. This boundary accommodates both active shortening and right lateral strike-slip across a series of large SW–NE trending faults.

== Earthquake ==
The focal mechanism of the earthquake was consistent with reverse faulting on a northwest-dipping fault. Fieldwork carried out immediately after the earthquake and in the following summer identified a 140 km long zone of surface rupture. This rupture consisted of a series of en echelon surface breaks. The type of observed displacement varied from dominantly reverse faulting to oblique reverse-right lateral to dominantly strike-slip. The vertical component of displacement was locally in the range 4–5 m, the horizontal component was always less than 3 m.

== See also ==
- List of earthquakes in 2006
- List of earthquakes in Russia
- Kamchatka earthquakes
- Kamchatka Peninsula
