= Shirshov Ridge =

Seabed ridge in the Bering Sea

Coordinates: 57°56′N 170°44′E

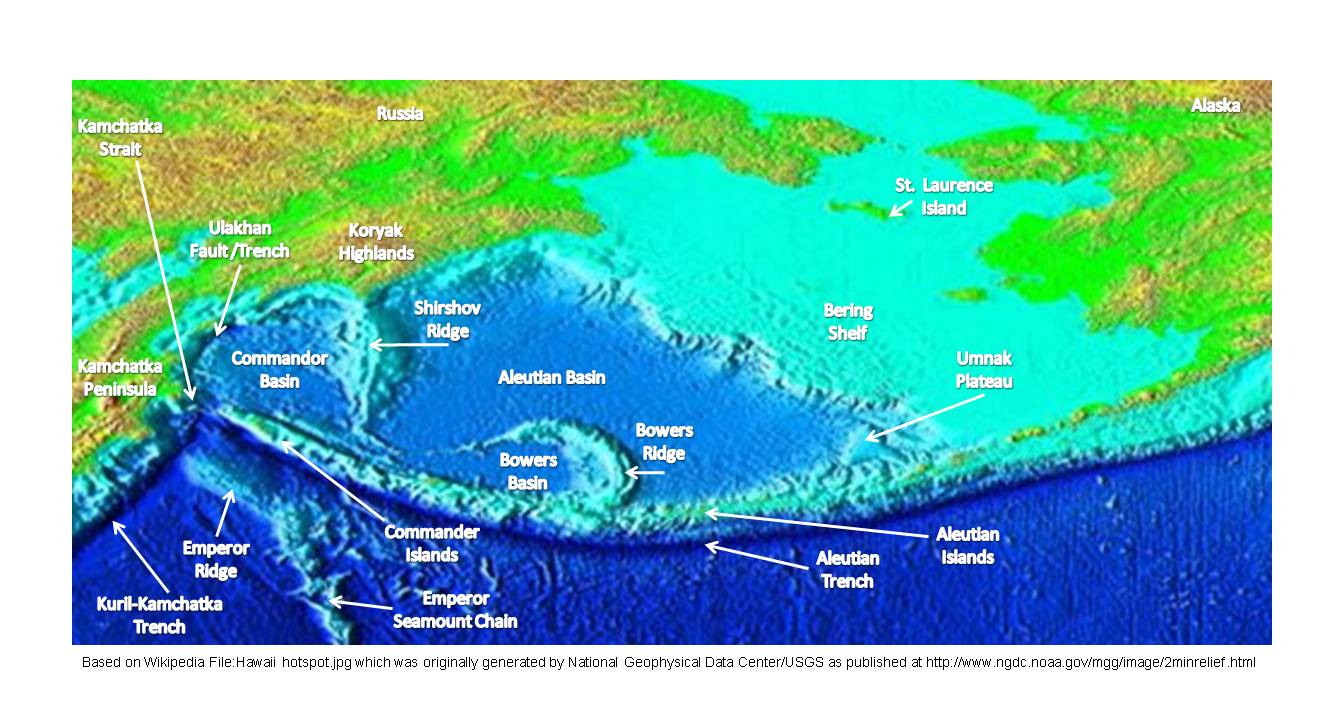
Aleutian Basin features.

The Shirshov Ridge is an underwater ridge located on the eastern border of the Commander Basin below the Kamchatka Peninsula. It extends directly southward for a distance of 750 km (470 mi) toward the Aleutian Arc in the eastern part of the Bering Sea (see figure).

The Shirshov Ridge rises 2–2.5 km above the surrounding basins. Although not immediately evident from the morphology, the Shirshov Ridge southern end extends to meet the northwesternmost portion of Bowers Ridge. The continuity is evident in structural maps of basement rocks, in magnetic surveys, and in free air gravity field surveys. The connection has been distorted by a sinistral shear fault, which has displaced the point of connection by ~350 km.

== See also ==
- Olyutor Range
