= Alyutors =

Chukotkan ethnic group of Kamchatka Krai, Russia

Нэмэлу nəməlʔu

Total population
- 96 (2021 census) Approximately 2000-3000 people.

Regions with significant populations
- Russia: Kamchatka: 96 (2021 census)

Languages
- Russian, Alyutor

Related ethnic groups
- other Chukotko-Kamchatkan peoples

The Alyutors (Russian: Алюторцы; self designation: Алутальу, or Alutal'u; Alyutor: нэмэлу, nəməlʔu;) are an ethnic group (formerly classified as a subgroup of Koryaks) who live on the Kamchatka Peninsula and Chukchi Peninsula of the Russian Far East. Today most of them live in Koryak Okrug of Kamchatka Krai.

The name also occurs as Olyutors or Olutors, as well as Olyutorka, a settlement where many of the Alyutor people formerly lived.

According to the 2021 Russian census, 96 people identified as Alyutors, but some estimates suggest that there could be approximately 2,000 to 3,000 of them living in Russia in the present day.

== Language ==
Alyutors spoke the Alyutor language (also known as Nymylan language), which belongs to the Chukotko-Kamchatkan language family; however less than 10% of the Alyutors still speak it. Most present Alyutors instead speak Koryak and Russian. Today, many Russian experts believe it to be a separate language, though it was previously considered a dialect of the Koryak language.

== History ==
The Alyutors are mentioned in the very first chronicles about the Russian colonisation of Kamchatka. In 1697, the Russian Cossacks imposed taxes on the Alyutors, who would show armed resistance in the next few years. After the suppression of the 1751 uprising, the number of the Alyutors significantly decreased. Also, they were constantly under attack from the Chukchis, who often confiscated their reindeer herds. In the late 18th century, the Alyutors were an isolated and secluded group of people, which helped them to avoid the smallpox epidemics almost unharmed. Also, such isolation helped them to preserve their traditional way of life.

Traditionally the Alyutors were engaged in reindeer breeding, fishing, trapping, and hunting. They positioned their settlements along the rivers on elevated spots with good visibility around them. Octagonal earth houses with vertical walls meant for 3 to 5 families were the only type of housing among the Alyutors up until the 19th century. Beginning in the 1950s and continuing through the 1970s, Alyutor children were sent to boarding schools which increased their loss of the Alyutor language and decreased their training in Alyutor traditions. Many Alyutors became teachers, doctors, geologists, and zoo technicians during the Soviet period.

Presently, the Alyutor traditions, culture, and art are endangered because of the decreases in reindeer population and reproduction caused by the worsening ecology of the region. Most Alyutors are practitioners of shamanism and Orthodox Christianity.

== See also ==
- Alyutor language
