= Priamurye Governorate-General =

1884–1917 Governorate-General of the Russian Empire

Priamurye Governorate-General Приамурское генерал-губернаторство (Russian)
- Governorate-General of Russian Empire
- 1884–1917
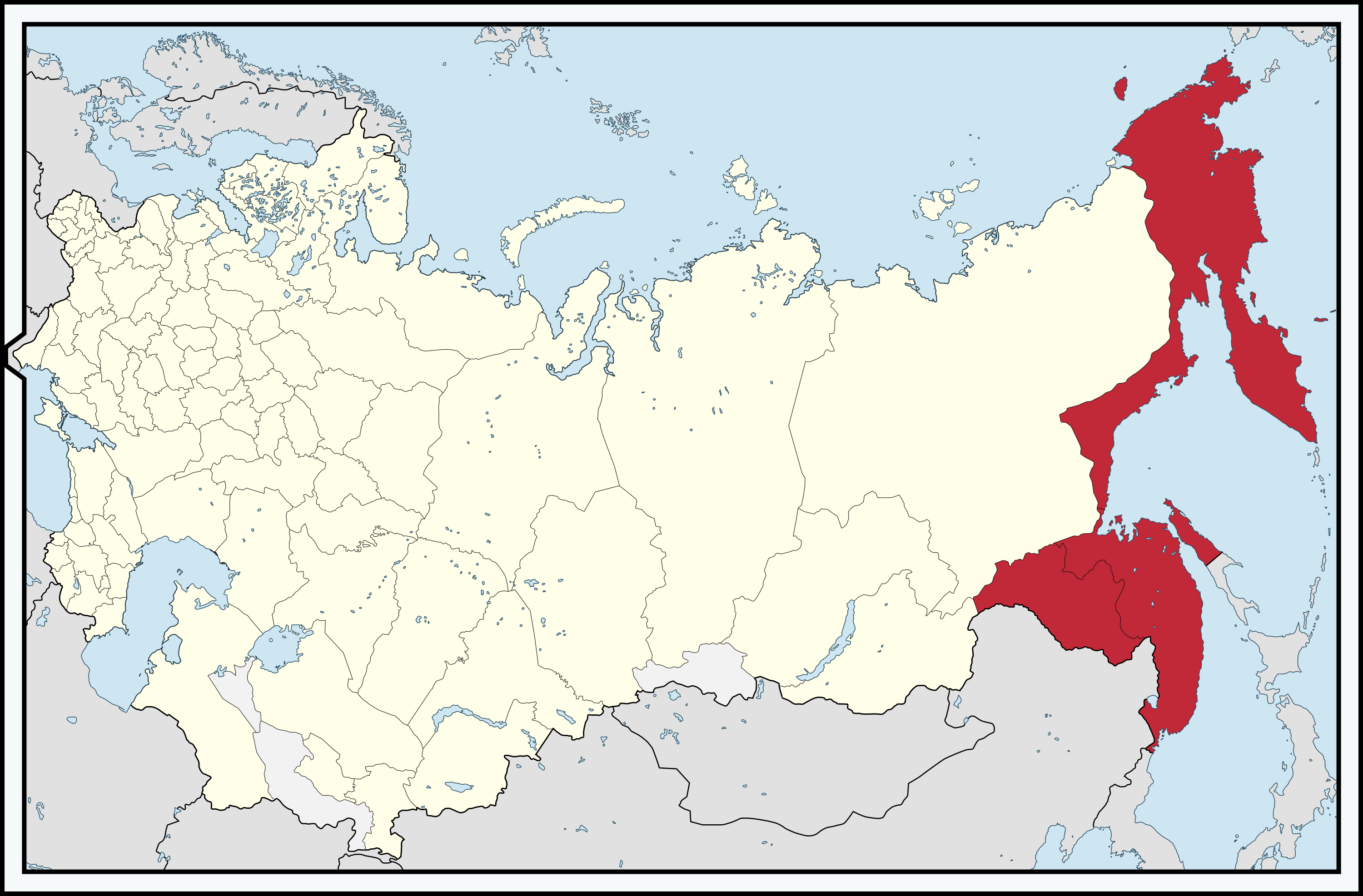
- Map of the Governorate-General; the Transbaikal Oblast is not included, although it was part of the colony.
- Capital: Khabarovsk
- History
  - Established: 1884
  - Disestablished: 1917
Preceded by
Eastern Siberian Governorate-General
Succeeded by
Far Eastern Republic
Karafuto Prefecture
State of Buryat-Mongolia
- Today part of: China; Russia; Japan (Note: Disputed; see Kuril Islands dispute for further information.)

Priamurye Governorate-General (Russian: Приамурское генерал-губернаторство, romanized: Priamurskoye general-gubernatorstvo), also known as the Amur Governorate-General or the Trans-Amurian Territory, was a Governorate-General of the Russian Empire located in the Russian Far East. This territory is often described as a colony that existed from 1884 until the 1917 Russian Revolution. It was established as part of an effort to prevent the Qing dynasty from reclaiming territories seized by unequal treaty and facilitate Russian settler-colonialism. It had a diverse population, including Russians, Ukrainians, Chinese, Koreans, Japanese, Buryats and several other indigenous peoples.

The territory was also informally known as the Priamurye Krai (Priamursky Krai, Russian: Приамурский край). After reaching the Pacific Ocean's eastern coast in the 17th century, Russia took control of Outer Manchuria with the 1860 Convention of Peking. In the two decades between the Convention of Peking and the establishment of the Governorate-General Russia strengthened its military and police presence in the region, relying on local Koreans to secure stability through a sedentary agrarian population. Convicts from metropolitan Russia and Trans-Siberian Railway workers additionally served as a sedentary population of ethnic Russians. The economy was primarily based on Asian labour, including Japanese fishermen and Sino-Korean farmers and labourers.

== Background and establishment ==
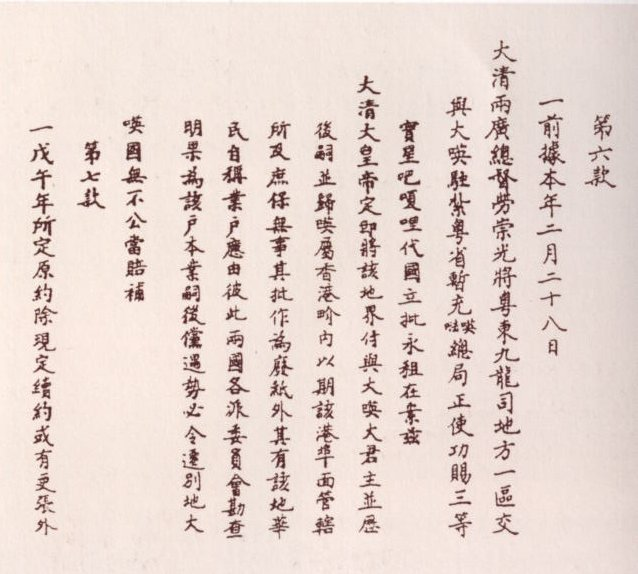
The 1860 Convention of Peking (text pictured) established Russian governance over Outer Manchuria.

The Russian Empire first reached the coast of the Pacific Ocean in the 17th century. During the mid-19th century, Russia took control of most of the region, including the Qing-controlled region of Outer Manchuria. In contrast to much of the rest of Siberia, which had been already effectively integrated into metropolitan Russia, the Russian Far East was largely indigenous, and during the 19th century, a local administration was established staffed by a native bureaucracy.

Russian interests were at first largely military, and following the 1860 Convention of Peking the Russian government focused little on the local economy. This lack of development was later lamented by admiral Ivan Delyanov, who contrasted the state of Outer Manchuria with the rapid expansion of British Hong Kong, which the Qing had ceded in the same treaty. Russian military and administrative leaders later noted with regret that the years between 1860 and 1884 were "two lost decades" in which disagreements over local bureaucracy prevented the development of a Far Eastern colony, administered separately from Siberia. Historian Kimitaka Matsuzato has argued against these claims, however, noting that during this period Russia continually built up its military force both in the Far East and its colonies in Central Asia in response to the Congress of Berlin and Chinese efforts to stabilise and strengthen the Qing dynasty. Priamurye Governorate-General was established on 16 June 1884 after three oblasts (Note: Amur Oblast, Primorskaya Oblast and Transbaikal Oblast, later joined by Kamchatka Oblast and Sakhalin Oblast in 1909.) were removed from the authority of the Eastern Siberian Governorate-General and placed under the control of the newly established Priamurye Governorate-General by an edict of Emperor Alexander III.

== Military and police presence ==
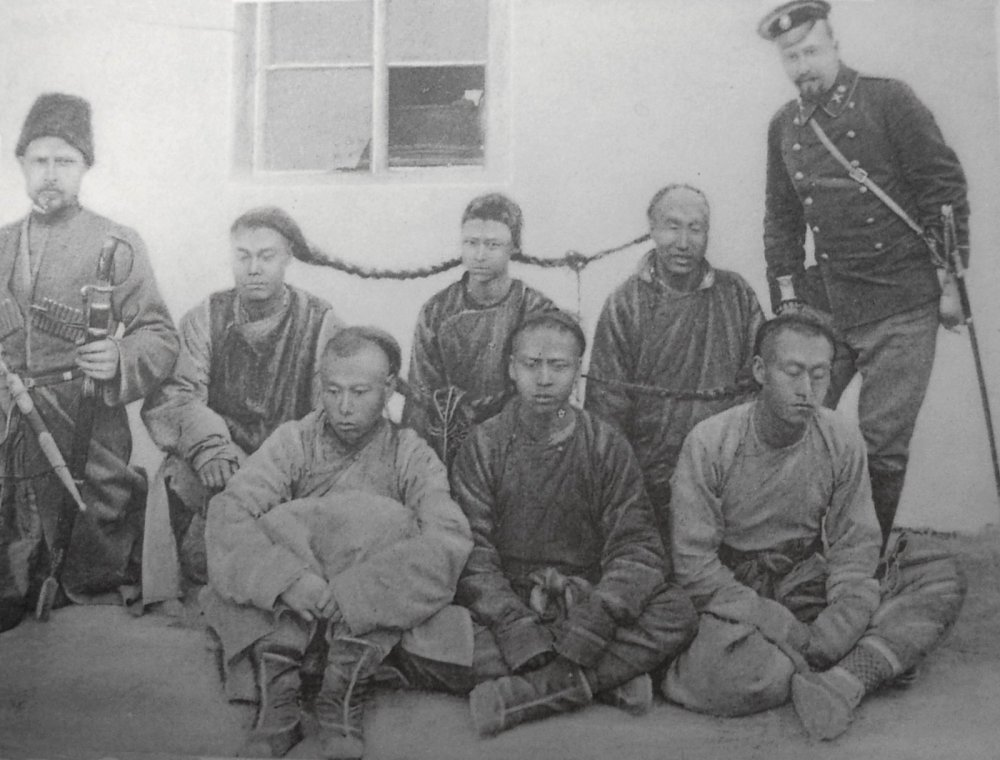
Honghuzi bandits arrested by Russian officials along the Chinese Eastern Railway, early 1900s. The dominance of the honghuzi in Priamurye led to the Russian government's creation of a large police force and prison system.

The Meiji Restoration and the end of the Japanese policy of sakoku, French, American and Japanese expeditions to Korea and increasing Qing assertiveness (as in a 1883 border war with Russia and the 1884 Sino-French War) led to increasing attention on the Pacific in diplomatic circles. The increasing authority of Wu Dacheng, commanding general of the Chinese province of Jilin, also caused alarm for Russia, especially with his open interest in reclaiming Outer Manchuria, which the Qing government shared. The threat posed by Wu had been one of the reasons for the Governorate-General's establishment, and the Ministry of War was involved in the territory from its inception.

Honghuzi banditry, as well as the frequent flow of goods and people between Outer Manchuria, Inner Manchuria and Korea led to the funding of a large police force in Priamurye. A prison was opened in the capital, Khabarovsk on 30 March 1886. It was followed by a Russian Orthodox church on 19 September 1899, which was created with the intention of assisting in the "spiritual education" of detainees. The Amur and Ussuri Cossack hosts played a significant role in policing, and were directly subordinated to the Governor-General.

As Russia continued to press into China around the turn of the century, Priamurye was tasked with defence of Russian concessions. The Chinese Eastern Railway north of Mukden (now Shenyang) fell under the jurisdiction of Priamurye, as did other territories. This brought the administration into conflict with that of Russian Dalian, which was given overlapping orders. The conflict was gradually resolved in favour of Dalian, with military presence and colonists moving from Outer Manchuria to Inner Manchuria, as well as the rapid growth of Harbin compared to Vladivostok and Khabarovsk. Priamurye, as well as Russia's concessions in China, were briefly governed as part of the Viceroyalty of the Far East from 1903 until 1905, when Russia's defeat in the Russo-Japanese War led to the loss of Dalian to Japan, the dissolution of the viceroyalty and the return of remaining concessions to Priamurye's control.

Priamurye's authorities strove to control the Chinese population, to little avail, and at times regarded them as representative of a hostile state. Russian forces stationed in the territory during the Boxer Rebellion engaged in massacres of Chinese civilians, killing thousands of local residents. The 1904–1905 Russo-Japanese War significantly involved Priamurye, and Matsuzato argues that efforts to expand military installations Priamurye. Honghuzi were frequently utilised by Japanese military commanders in order to terrorise Russian populations. The Russian colonial and military administration forcefully removed Chinese and Korean populations from the town of Vladivostok, and following Russia's defeat by Japan and the beginning of the Russian Revolution of 1905, violently cracked down on unrest among soldiers, citing the October Manifesto as a justification.

The February Revolution of 1917 led to the establishment of multiple soviets soon after news of the revolution reached Priamurye on 16 March [O.S. 3 March] 1917. The Vladivostok Soviet, a ten-member body including one Bolshevik, two Mensheviks and two Socialist Revolutionaries, was established with a stated mission of managing the local military garrison, protecting cargo in the port of Vladivostok. The large number of soldiers among its members made it a potent political force in the city, though military and police activities continued as they had before the soviet's establishment. In Khabarovsk, however, the local soviet took a much more radical approach; Governor-General Nikolay Gondatti and general Arkady Nishchenkov were arrested within two days and several other administrators were also held by the soviet administration. The Khabarovsk Soviet, led by Menshevik D. I. Titkin (later internationalist Menshevik Nikolai Valukin), seized control of the administration and declared it to be under the control of Khabarovsk's local soviet. Historian John J. Stephan describes Priamurye as ceasing to exist on 16 March 1917, though he notes that the colonial administration continued to function.

In contrast to metropolitan Russia, where the soviets acted as a form of opposition to the post-revolutionary Russian Provisional Government and the Russian Republic, the soviets in Priamurye largely supported it, and the administration continued to function after Aleksandr Rusanov was appointed to the newly-minted title of commissioner over the region. The Russian Social Democratic Labour Party's branches, particularly Bolsheviks, spread rapidly throughout the summer and autumn of 1917 as the local Bolsheviks (led by Chicago-based Russian émigrés such as Bill Shatoff and Alexander Krasnoshchyokov) chose to favour local conditions in their programme over rigid adherence to the theses of Vladimir Lenin and the Petrograd Soviet. Following the October Revolution these Bolsheviks established Red Guard units comprising Austro-Hungarian and German prisoners of war, Koreans, soldiers, Amur Flotilla sailors and factory workers. They overthrew Rusanov and his entourage and declared the Far East to be subordinated to the Petrograd Soviet on 24 December 1917. The entire region descended into chaos within three months of the putsch as the Russian Civil War reached the Far East.

== Economy ==
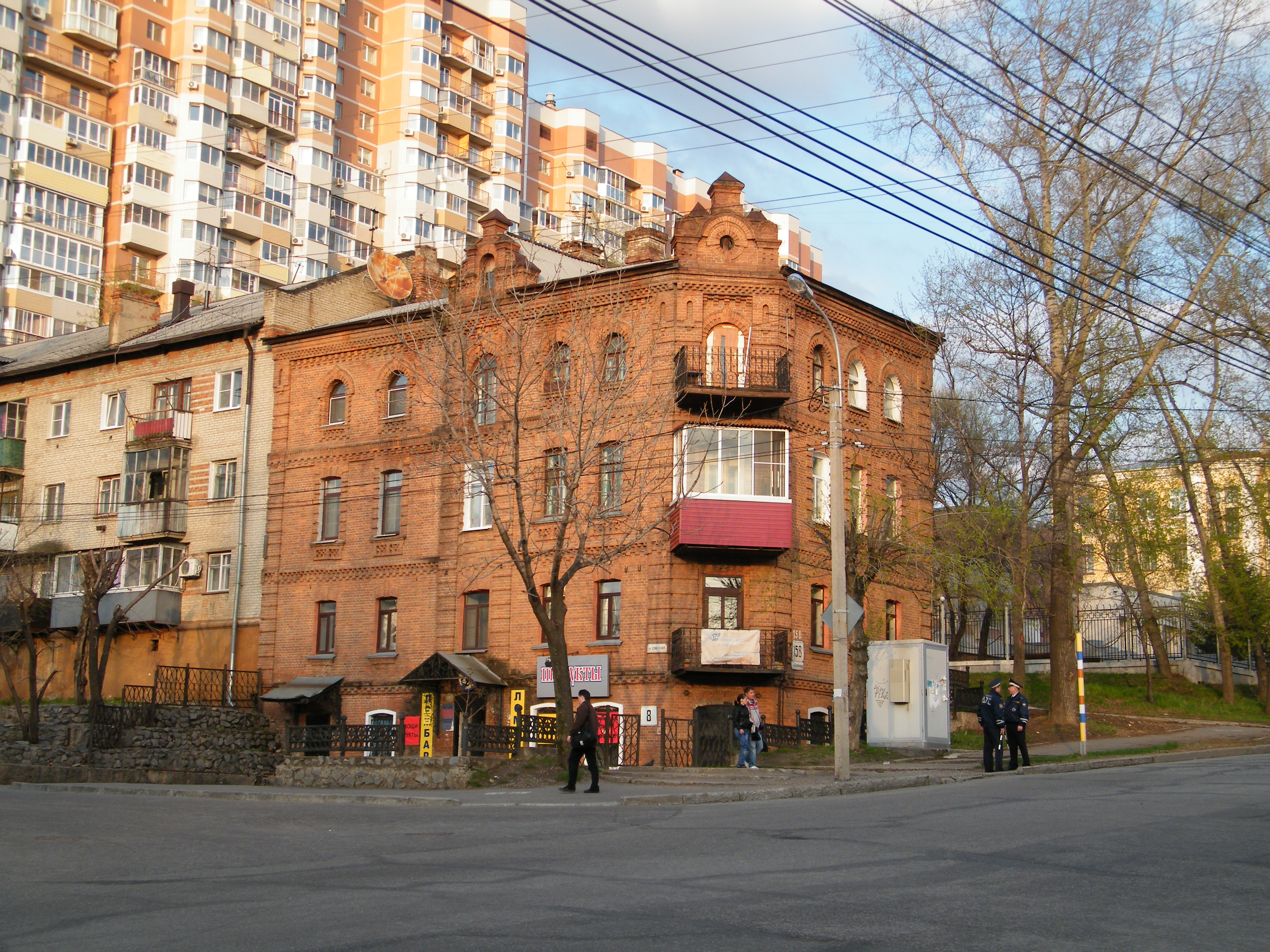
The Khabarovsk home of Chinese merchant Ji Fengtai. A large East Asian merchant class existed in Priamurye, and the colony was also dependent on East Asian workers for hard labour.

Priamurye was largely agrarian in nature. East Asian labourers, of whom there were tens of thousands, outnumbered their Russian equivalents in the colony, much to the consternation of administrators. Chinese and Korean workers were usually farmhands, miners, fishers or haulers. Certain political figures, such as Governor-General Paul Simon Unterberger and Georgy Lvov, regarded East Asian workers as a threat to the Russian race. Unterberger in particular wrote in 1910, "I prefer a Russian wasteland to a land cultivated by Koreans. [...] I will not have it on my conscience that I gave Russian land to any yellows for plunder." Such an assessment was resisted by other officials, such as Amur Oblast deputy Feofilakt Chilikin, who argued that while greater surveillance of "yellows" was necessary, it would be impossible to remove them from the economy.

Japanese fishers operating in Russian territorial waters comprised a significant portion of the maritime economy, as did freight from China and Korea. The territorial government financed itself by instituting a moderate fee on fish exported by Japanese fishing hauls in Russian territorial waters. This, along with Korean agriculture and Chinese-established commercial transportation networks, was intended to serve as the basis for Priamurye's economic development without the usage of government funds. While the Russian government encouraged this, however, it issued contradictory orders against the hosting of East Asians as workers and increased regional economic integration.

The free-trade zone between Priamurye and Inner Manchuria caused the emergence of a large Chinese merchant class in the territory, with traders coming from as far south as Guangdong to buy and sell ginseng, kelp, sea cucumbers, crab and alcohol. Opium was also produced by Chinese farms and sold in both Priamurye and China proper. Chinatowns also existed in Vladivostok and Khabarovsk, where they were known as Millionka and the Chinese village, respectively. Chinese workers, often from Shandong, were frequently hired as labour by Russian enterprises, working in the Amur goldfields and Vladivostok shipyards. By 1915, the number of gold miners who were Chinese was 76%. Nine in ten workers at Vladivostok's docks were also Chinese, as was almost all unskilled labour on Russia's railways in the Far East.

== Ethnic relations ==
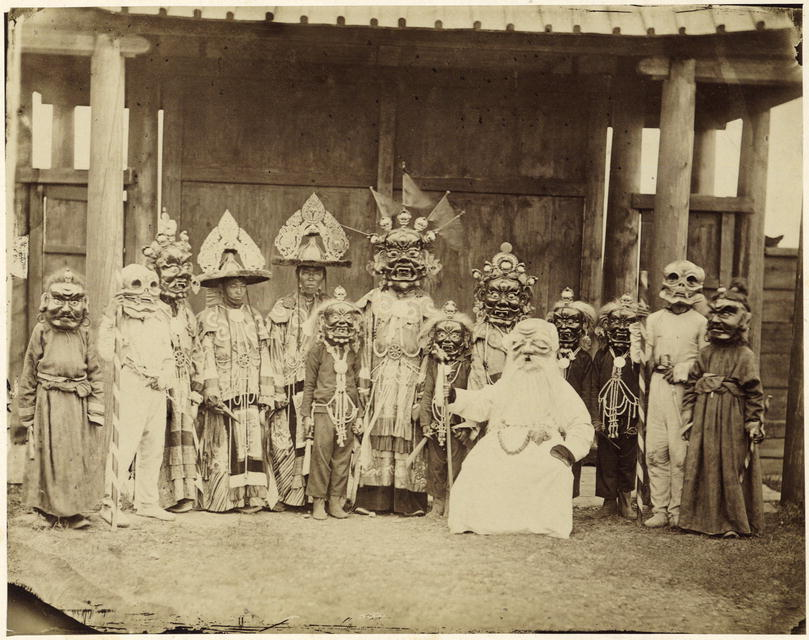
A cham dance ceremony at Tamchinsky datsan, 1890s

Priamurye was fundamentally a settler colony, and Russia pursued settler colonialism at various times in line with its resettlement policy. Convicts from metropolitan Russia were used to settle the region, as were workers on the Trans-Siberian Railway. The process of settling peasants in the region caused unrest among the Cossacks, who regarded their infringement upon their territories with disdain, but the administration of the Governorate-General favoured the peasants due to the Cossacks' nomadic nature. This in turn led some Ussuri Cossacks to employ Chinese and Koreans as farmhands.

The native Buryat population, centred in the Transbaikal Oblast, gradually developed a sense of identity, culminating in Buryat intellectuals' public proposals for indigenous self-government during the Russian Revolution of 1905. They were originally permitted to organise clan-based steppe dumas, though these were abolished at the turn of the century. The Buryat nationalist movement also had significant influence from Tibetan Buddhism, with Choynzon-Dorzho Iroltuyev, the head of the Buddhist faith among Buryats as the Khambo Lama, expressing support for Transbaikal autonomy.

Regarded as inorodtsy, most Buryats were barred from holding positions in academia or other public fields, with the notable exception of Gombojab Tsybikov. Another group was the zaamurtsy (Russian: заамурцы, lit. 'trans-Amurians'), who favoured what historian Ivan Sablin has referred to as a "proto-regionalist" policy akin to the Siberian regionalism movement, though he notes that the zaamurtsy never formed a unified group. According to Sablin, this regionalist movement led to the eventual establishment of the Far Eastern Republic during the Russian Civil War. The most common positions amongst the zaamurtsy were expanding the zemstvo system to Priamurye and the restoration of the free-trade zone after its 1909.

=== East Asians ===
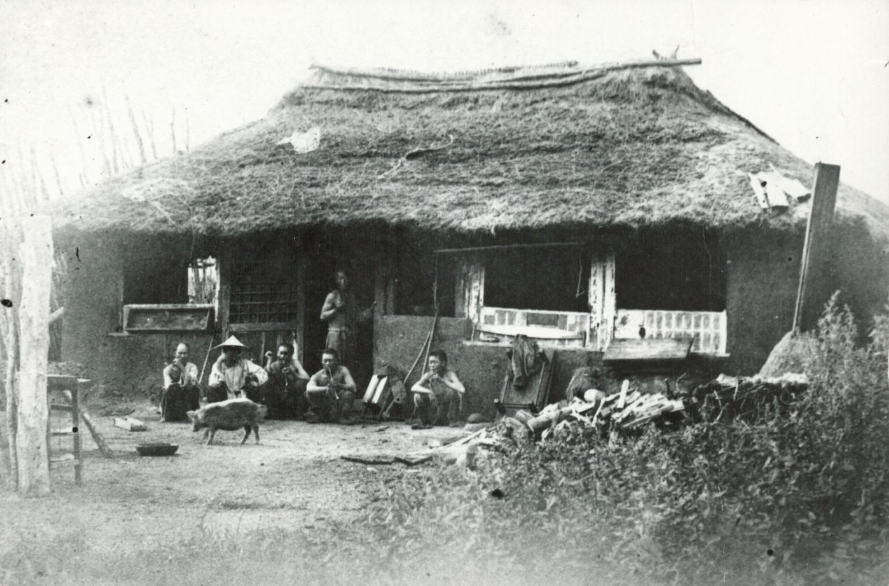
A Korean home in Nakhodka (Korean: 나홋카), 1893

The Governorate-General included significant populations of Chinese people, Koreans and Japanese people compared to relatively low numbers of ethnic Russians. Russia's initial settlement plans had been thwarted by the territory's size, which made the development of a native sedentary population less than ideal in the government's eyes, and distance from the metropole, which made it inaccessible for most Russians. The discovery of a hamlet of Korean farmers on the banks of the Tumen River pleased the Russians, and Korean migrant workers were frequently allowed into the region.

The Russian government, however, was also deeply suspicious of the local Japanese and especially Chinese and Korean populations living in the region, and both mentions of a Yellow Peril and comparisons to Indians, Indochinese and Africans who had been colonised by Western European nations were common in both Russian and foreign Western rhetoric. Koreans' perceived belonging to the Joseon dynasty, which was a Qing tributary with ties to Japan, particularly sparked alarm, and Russian colonial officials frequently held conferences on the "Korean question" from the 1880s onward. A passport system was established, by which East Asians living in Priamurye were segregated from the Russian population and required to hold stamped documents demonstrating their status as Russian subjects. These passports could be seized by Russian police and re-stamped with a fine, non-payment of which would result in deportation.

Significant portions of the local Korean population were converted to Eastern Orthodoxy and they were often stripped of their status as inorodtsy, becoming recognised as legally equal to ethnic Russians. They were frequently used to settle territories that lacked existing sedentary populations in return for losing their inorodtsy status. Russian authorities, however, expressed frustration at the frequent transit of Koreans throughout Northeast Asia, and attempted in vain to crack down on it. Among Chinese and native communities, hui fang guilds served as the recognised local government above Priamurye, enforcing Chinese laws and self-defence militias.

The Japanese community, compared to its Chinese and Korean equivalents, was small and largely made up of individuals from Nagasaki. Despite their smaller numbers, they quickly formed an important part of the local economy, primarily engaging in services, trade and – among women – prostitution. Japanese nationalist organisations, such as the Gen'yōsha and the Black Dragon Society, were also active in Priamurye, and Japanese prostitutes' popularity among Russian soldiers made the region a haven of Kempeitai intelligence-gathering.

Increasing Japanese encroachment onto the Joseon dynasty worsened ethnic relations between Koreans and Japanese and led the Korean population to become increasingly politicised. Local Koreans formed paramilitaries and began attacking their Japanese counterparts. Itō Hirobumi, the first Prime Minister of Japan, was assassinated by An Jung-geun, a Korean political exile who had been living in Vladivostok prior to assassinating Itō.
