= Dejan Subotić =

Russo-Serbian military and state leader

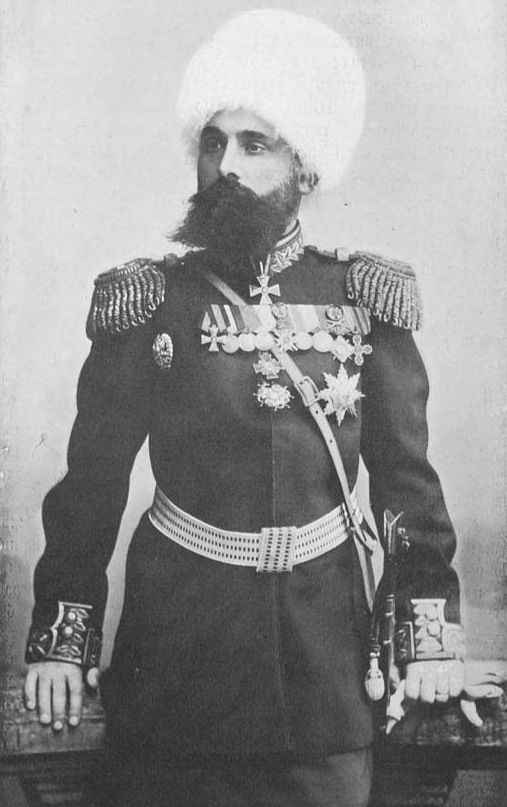

Governor General of Russian Turkestan
- In office 28 November 1905 – 1906
- Preceded by: Nikolai Tevyashev
- Succeeded by: Nikolai Grodekov

Governor General of Amur Oblast
- In office 1 November 1902 – 30 July 1903
- Preceded by: Nikolai Grodekov
- Succeeded by: Yevgeni Alekseyev

Governor General of Transcaspia
- In office 10 April 1901 – 14 December 1902
- Preceded by: Andrey Bogolyubov
- Succeeded by: Evgeny Ussakovsky

Administrator of Russian Dalian
- In office 18 September 1898 – July 1899
- Preceded by: Oskar Starck
- Succeeded by: Yevgeni Alekseyev

Military Governor of Primorskaya Oblast
- In office 11 June 1897 – 10 September 1898
- Preceded by: Paul Simon Unterberger
- Succeeded by: Nikolai Chichagov

Personal details
- Born: 7 May 1852 Vienna, Austrian Empire
- Died: 1920 (aged 67–68) Zagreb, Kingdom of Yugoslavia

Military service
- Allegiance: Russian Empire
- Branch/service: Imperial Russian Army
- Years of service: 1866–1906
- Rank: Lieutenant General
- Battles/wars: Russo-Turkish War; Boxer Rebellion

Dejan Ivanovich Subotić (also spelled Dejan Subotich and Dean Subbotich; 7 May 1852 – 1920) was a Russo-Serbian military and state leader, military governor of Russian Dalian (Primorye oblast; 1897–1898); Transcaspian Oblast (Zakaspiyskaya oblast, 1901–1902), general governor of Primorsky Krai (1902-1903), Military ataman of the Ussuri Cossack Host, Governor General of Amur Oblast (1903-1905) and Turkestan (1905-1906).

Dejan Subotić was the son of the well-known Serbian poet Jovan Subotić. Dejan's brother Ozren Subotić was a Serbian travel writer.

== Serbian-Turkish War ==
Dean Ivanovich Subotić was born in Vienna, Austrian Empire on 7 May 1852. He graduated from high school in Austria, and in 1867 joined the Russian military service in St. Petersburg. There he was educated at the Second Konstantinovsky Military Academy where he received the rank of second lieutenant and was appointed to the guards. From 1871 to 1874 he was enrolled at the prestigious His Imperial Majesty Nicholas General Staff Academy and the Naval Cadet Corps.

Upon graduation, he was sent to the artillery brigade of the Caucasian Grenadier Division of Grand Duke Mikhail Nikolayevich and promoted to lieutenant on 13 April 1875.

The following year he went to warring Serbia, to the headquarters of the Timok-Moravian army under the command of General Mikhail Chernyayev. According to Russian sources, he participated in a series of battles against the Turks, and on 5 February 1877, he was promoted to the rank of captain.

In the early spring of 1877, Subotić was re-enlisted in the Kiev Military District. Then, in September 1885, he became Chief of Staff of the 15th Infantry Division in Odessa, and from 6 March 1889 to 11 January 1893, he was again on duty in the Caucasian Grenadier Division in Tbilisi.

== Russian Far East ==
In March 1894, after being promoted to the rank of Major General, Subotić was sent to the Russian Far East where he succeeded Paul Simon Unterberger as the military administrator of the Primorskaya Oblast on 27 May 1897.

From 1897 to 1898 he was on duty as a military governor of the Primorsky Krai, and Ataman of the Ussuri Cossack Host. It was at the same time when his countryman, the chief engineer of Chinese Eastern Railway (CER) construction, Aleksandr Iosifovich Iugovich prepared the groundbreaking ceremonies for the CER to take place. Colonel (later Major General) Dmitry Horvat who would succeed Iugovich in 1903, was present in the capacity as head of administration of the Ussuri railway system. The highlight of the event was when Subotić unfurled the CER flag, a symbol of Russian and Chinese partnership and cooperation before 80 foreign delegates who had arrived specifically for the occasion.

Later, Subotić was sent to the city of Dalian to replace commander Oskar Starck on 18 September 1898 to July 1899 as military governor of Transcaspian Oblast. Then, on 12 August 1900, he was promoted to the rank of Lieutenant-General.

A year before Subotić's last promotion, a Boxer Rebellion broke out in China. Dissatisfied with foreign influences in China, rebels had launched a series of attacks on foreigners. In Beijing and other cities, a large number of Russians and Chinese people who were converted to Christianity were killed. Among them were 222 Orthodox Chinese, which the Russian Orthodox Church later had canonized as martyrs.

The so-called Boxers meanwhile attacked the Chinese eastern railway in Manchuria, the Chinese province of Heilongjiang. A significant part of the railway infrastructure, which Russia built, was destroyed or damaged, and there were also human losses. Unlike other parts of China, Boxers were targeting their attacks only on Russians in Manchuria. Russia intervened and regained control of Mukden (today Shenyang) and other parts of Manchuria. Russian intervention in Manchuria was one of the causes of the subsequent Russian-Japanese war. At that time, Dejan Subotić was engaged in defending the Russian eastern coast of unrest caused by the Boxer Rebellion and the pacification of Manchuria. He participated in the Chinese campaign as Governor-General of the Amur and Guandong. (Note: At that time "Guandong" (not to be confused with "Guangdong") was another name for Manchuria. It means "east of the Pass.") Subotić commanded the Mukden Operation that returned the city under Russian control. Making use of their artillery, his forces took Haicheng, Yingkou, Liaoyang, and other cities as they moved north towards Mukden. On October 1 they occupied Mukden without any fighting. On October 6, Subotić linked up with Russian forces advancing from the north, thus completing the invasion of Manchuria.

== Russian Turkestan ==
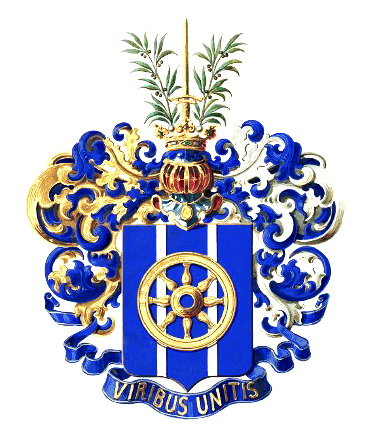
Coat of arms of Subotić family

After the Chinese campaign, Subotić served in Russian Turkestan until 1902, where he commanded the 2nd Turkestan Army Corps and was the head of the Transcaspian Oblast (in office: 1901-1902). During 1902 and 1903 he returned to the Far East as the general governor of the Amur Oblast (Priamur region), the commander of the Priamur military district and the commanding officer of the island's horsemen. At the same time, in 1903, he became a member of the Military Council of the Ministry of the Army.

During this time the Russian Imperial Geographical Society petitioned Subotić to allow Bronislaw Pilsudski to participate in Waclaw Sieroszewski's expedition to the island of Hokkaido to study the language of the Ainu people and their folklore for four months. The petition received his support and that of the Russian Ministry of Internal Affairs.

In October 1903, Subotić wrote to Army Minister Aleksey Kuropatkin that Russia should exploit Vladivostok, not the city of Dalian, as suggested by Sergei Witte. His reasons were sound: he knew the geopolitical volatility of the region, not to mention the economic implications of the time. Subotić read Spiridon Dionisovich Merkulov's 1903 book ("Possible Fates of Russian Trade in the Far East") which showed that "profits from the tea trade from China to European Russia via Vladivostok had fallen after the construction [1897-1902] of the CER (Chinese Eastern Railway)."

Two years later, Subotić commanded the Turkestan Military District, replacing the Governor-General Nikolay N. Teviashov (who died in 1905), and was the commanding officer of the Cossack army there. In 1906 Subotić and his assistant General Vladimir Viktorovich Sakharov were forced to resign on charges of supporting liberalism. Subotić's successor was General Nikolay I. Grodekov.

In 1918, Subotić became the Honorary Consul of the Kingdom of Serbia in Yalta. He died in Zagreb, Kingdom of Yugoslavia in 1920.

== Works ==
- "Amur Yellow Road and Our Policy in the Far East", 1907
- "Russian Tasks in the Far East", 1908

== Orders and decorations ==
- Order of Saint Stanislav, 3rd class (1880)
- Order of Saint Stanislav, 2nd degree (1887)
- Order of Saint Anna, 2nd Class (1890)
- Order of Saint Vladimir, 4th degree (1894);
- Royal favor (1896);
- Order of Saint Vladimir, 3rd class (1896);
- Order of Saint Stanislav, 1st Class (1899);
- Order of St. George, 4th degree for military distinctions in the Chinese campaign (12/22/1900);
- Order of Saint Anna, 1st Class (1903);
- Order of Saint Vladimir, 2nd degree (1905).

Other States:

- Order of the Cross of Takovo, 4th degree (Serbia, 1906);
- Order of the Star of Romania, 4th degree (Romania, 1878);
- Cross "Danube Crossing"(Romania, 1877). This form of the Danube cross was awarded to Russian soldiers who crossed the Danube in April 1877 during the War of Independence against Ottoman Turkey, 1877–1878;
- Order of the Double Dragon, 2nd Class, 1st grade (China, 1896);
- Order of the Rising Sun, 2nd Class (Japan, 1898);
- Order of the Crown, 2nd Class (Prussia, 1900).

== See also ==
- Anto Gvozdenović
- Dmitry Horvat
