= Nikolay Gondatti =

Russian statesman (1860–1946)

Nikolay Lvovich Gondatti
- Николай Львович Гондатти
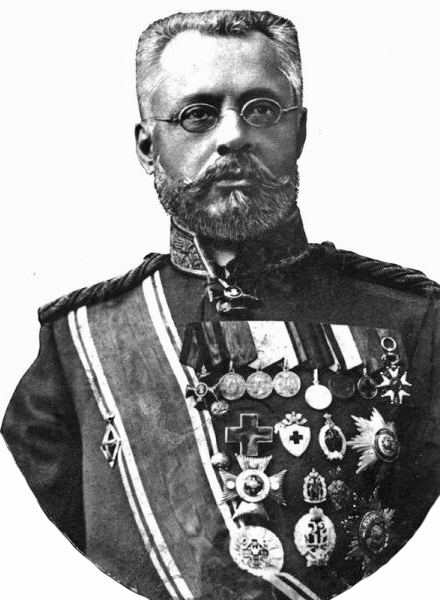

Tobolsk Governor
- In office January 13, 1906 – September 15, 1908
- Preceded by: Alexander Lappo-Starzhenetsky
- Succeeded by: Dmitry Gagman

27th Tomsk Governor
- In office September 15, 1908 – January 29, 1911
- Preceded by: Karl Nolken
- Succeeded by: Yegor Izvekov

8th Priamursky Governor-General
- In office January 30, 1911 – March 2, 1917
- Preceded by: Paul Simon Unterberger
- Succeeded by: Office abolished

Personal details
- Born: December 3, 1860 Moscow, Russian Empire
- Died: April 5, 1946 (aged 85) Harbin, Soviet Military Administration
- Spouse: Margarita
- Education: Law Faculty of Imperial Moscow University (1887); Physics and Mathematics Faculty of Imperial Moscow University (1887)
- Awards: Legion of Honour; Order of the Golden Kite; Order of Saint Vladimir; Order of Saint Stanislaus; Order of Saint Alexander Nevsky; Order of Noble Bukhara; Medal "In memory of the reign of Emperor Alexander III"

Nikolay Lvovich Gondatti (December 3, 1860 – April 5, 1946) was a Russian statesman, a researcher of Northern and Northeastern Siberia. Stallmeister of the Court of His Imperial Majesty Nicholas II, Active State Councillor. A member of many Russian scientific societies.

== Biography ==
=== Early years ===
Nikolay Gondatti was born in 1860 in Moscow to the family of an Italian professional sculptor Ludwig Gondatti and a Russian woman Yekaterina of a simple origin from Tula).

At the age of 15, Nikolay entered the Nizhny Novgorod Aleksandrovsky Institute, which at that time represented a secondary school with a classical liberal education. In 1881 he graduated with a gold medal.

In 1887 he graduated with honors from the Faculty of Law and Faculty of Physics and Mathematics (Natural History Department) of Moscow University. Every year, until 1892, he participated in expeditions and visited various provinces of the Russian Empire, Germany, England, Turkey, Asia Minor, Syria, Egypt, Austria, France, India, Ceylon, China, Japan and America; he had gold medals for the expedition to Western Siberia and for his collection of collections on sericulture.

In 1887, he was appointed a teacher of natural science at the School of the Order of Saint Catherine, and from January 1, 1888 – at the Moscow Alexander Institute.

=== Governor of Tomsk Governorate (1908–1911) ===
On September 15, 1908 he was appointed Tomsk governor, arrived in Tomsk on October 18, 1908.

With his participation in the city of Tomsk opened the Higher Women's Courses. In 1909, participates in a meeting in Saint Petersburg on the needs of Siberia.

An honorary citizen of the city of Novonikolayevsk (now Novosibirsk). The title was awarded on May 3, 1910 for numerous achievements in helping the city in the fire of May 1909. Here is how it is stated on the official website of the city of Novosibirsk:

On May 11, 1909, a terrible disaster happened in Novonikolayevsk – a large fire that started in the central part of the city, which quickly spread in the direction of the Ob. The city burned for four days. According to the city council, 794 courtyards were burned out. 8 thousand people were left homeless. A major administrator, a researcher of Northern and Northeastern Siberia, and Tomsk Governor Nikolay Lvovich Gondatti, who began the investigation of the causes of the disaster and questioned city officials, arrived to inspect the fire. After the trial, the governor took effective measures: he assisted in obtaining insurance, participated in organizing the release of building materials for the restoration of the city at the expense of the treasury, helped the city government in implementing the urban planning policy. For these services, Nikolay Gondatti became an Honorary resident of the city of Novo-Nikolaevsk. The city soon recovered and continued to grow with even greater rapidity.

By the decision of the Tomsk City Council of February 9, 1911, Nikolay Gondatti was awarded the title of Honorary Citizen of the city of Tomsk.

In 1910 he was appointed head of the Amur Expedition. The Amur expedition under the leadership of Gondatti was the last scientific action of pre-revolutionary Russia, and the results were very significant. On the expedition treasury released 600 thousand rubles. This well-organized and equipped expedition, contrary to expectations, had almost no effect on the tsarist government's resettlement policy, although its works (more than 40 volumes) were promptly published.

=== Amur Governor-General (1911–1917) ===
In this post, he did a lot for the economic, social and cultural development of the region, firmly defended it against the expansion of Japan and China. Under the governorship of Gondatti in the Amur region, social activity intensified, the Kedrovaya Pad nature reserve was established, a teacher's institute was opened in Khabarovsk in 1914, schools were built in the villages. Gondatti paid special attention to the life of the indigenous population of the Amur region, prohibited the sale of alcoholic beverages in camps. He was a direct participant and chief guardian of the construction of a unique bridge across the Amur River and the Amur Railroad, thanks to which the Amur Territory overcame its isolation and was able to become part of the economic system of Russia. He succeeded in realizing plans for connecting the Ussurian railway with the Amur railway with access to the Trans-Baikal railway. He initiated the construction of the port of Vladivostok and the clearing of the mouth of the Amur River near Nikolayevsk, and in every way encouraged the development of trade, crafts, agriculture and industry. Negative about the influence of China, Korea and Japan in the Russian Far East, he was also a supporter of attracting foreign capital to the region. Such vital issues as the development of the veterinary service and the formation of the meteorological service in the region, the organization of extensive land management work and the dacha settlement near Vladivostok, the creation of the first reserve and the department of the Russian society of Oriental studies did not remain out of his attention. As the first civil governor-general, who also had a great intellectual potential, Nikolay Gondatti had a beneficial effect on the moral atmosphere in the region, on the development of science, education and culture here. "Dear to my heart region", – this is how he defined his attitude to the Amur region in one of the articles in the newspaper. Indeed, he, like Nikolay Grodekov, cordially treated the region, its population. He devoted 16 years of fruitful work to the far eastern outskirts of Russia, having traveled from the head of the circumpolar district, Chukotka, to the highest rank in the local administrative bureaucracy of Russia, the governor-general of a vast and young region, who held an extremely responsible geopolitical position. The style of work of the Governor-General was characterized by initiative, perseverance in defending the interests of the region in front of the government, studying the state of affairs on the spot, demanding of subordinates. Friendliness and accessibility attracted people to him. Nikolay Lvovich possessed another valuable quality, without which one cannot fully understand many of his actions – he was an ascetic, that is, a man ready for the common good to accomplish the feat, able to endure discomfort for the sake of an important country: endure hardship and physical overload. Nikolay Gondatti was awarded the title of honorary citizen of the city of Khabarovsk in 1911.

Gondatti's career ended in March 1917 with the abdication of Nicholas II. A public security committee elected in Khabarovsk decided to arrest Gondatti as soon as he arrived on a train from a business trip. Gondatti was arrested and sent under escort to Petrograd, to the Emergency Commission to investigate the iniquities and abuses committed by the tsarist ministers and major dignitaries. The commission did not find any serious abuse of power by Gondatti, and he was released. At the end of May 1917, Gondatti resigned.

At the invitation of the University of Helsingfors (Helsinki), he lectured on ethnography.

=== Head of the Land Department of the Chinese Eastern Railway ===
In the city of Harbin since December 1918. In July 1922, the Amur Zemstvo Council proposed Gondatti to the post of Provisional Ruler of the Amur State, but Gondatti withdrew his candidacy. He avoided the "doubtful", in his opinion, cooperation with the Merkulovs. It is known for certain that Gondatti refused to become the banner of counter-revolution in the Far East. In 1923, at the request of the Bolsheviks, was arrested by the Manchurian authorities. Under pressure from Japan, the Bolsheviks put him not in prison, but in the hospital. In Harbin, he worked together with Nikolay Sviyagin, whom he met and worked in Russia. Both died and were buried in Harbin.

The reference book "The Whole Harbin" for 1925 reports that Nikolay Gondatti, since 1918, heads the scientific and land department of the Chinese Eastern Railway and rents a rather modest apartment in a corner building along Bolshoy Prospekt. In Harbin, Nikolay Gondatti was active in social and scientific work. He soon became chairman of the Society of Russian Orientalists, the oldest Russian research association in Manchuria, which existed from 1909 to 1927. In 1920, the question was raised about opening a technical school in Harbin, as the Chinese Eastern Railway began to feel an acute need for technical personnel and sought to hire them. The Society for the Establishment of a Russian-Chinese Technical School in the City of Harbin was organized, which was headed by Lieutenant-General Dmitry Horvat, and Nikolay Gondatti was appointed chairman of the board. Classes in the new school began on October 18, 1920. The technical school gradually developed its technical equipment and strengthened its authority.

On April 2, 1922, the Russian-Chinese Technical School was transformed into a Russian-Chinese Polytechnic Institute – the first higher technical educational institution in Harbin. The main burden of managing the reorganization of this university, negotiations with the senior management of the Chinese Eastern Railway and the Harbin community organizations regarding its future development plans fell on the shoulders of Nikolay Gondatti, the head of the Land Department of the Chinese Eastern Railway Board, who in 1923 became the chairman of the board of the society for the establishment of the Russian-Chinese Polytechnic Institute and later Harbin Polytechnic Institute.

With the help of Nikolay Gondatti in Modyagou in August 1924 the Kazan-Bogorodsky monastery was founded. At the end of 1924, he was chairman of the Manchurian Agricultural Society, whose main task was the dissemination of agricultural knowledge and work to improve local livestock and agricultural crops in Northern Manchuria. Thus, while in exile, Nikolay Gondatti held major administrative and public posts, doing his best for the good of the Russian people who found themselves not in their will in a foreign country.

Nikolay Gondatti died in Harbin in April 1946. He was buried at the New Cemetery, which to this day has not survived.

== Awards ==
For service, Gondatti was awarded the Order of Saint Vladimir, 3rd and 4th classes, Order of Saint Stanislaus, 2nd and 3rd classes, including one for studying the Siberian suburbs, Order of Saint Alexander Nevsky, a silver medal in memory of the reign of Emperor Alexander III and a bronze medal "For the works on the first General Population Census of 1897".

In 1898, the Russian Geographical Society awarded Gondatti the Fyodor Litke Large Gold Medal for Ethnography (for all the work that he transferred during his stay among the Chukchi and for the research already published). In 1901, the Imperial Academy of Sciences – the Big Golden Medal named after Academician Ber (1901).

Awards of foreign countries: the Japanese Order of the Golden Kite, the Chinese Order of the Double Dragon, the Bukhara Order of the Golden Star, the French Order of the Legion of Honour.

Nikolay Lvovich Gondatti was an honorary citizen of the cities of Beryozovo, Tyumen, Tomsk, Novo-Nikolaevsk, Yekaterinburg, Khabarovsk, Surgut.

== Remembrance ==
- In the Tobolsk Governorate, in the Tarsky district of the Atir volost, the Gondatyevsky settlement was named after him.
- Since July 1909, the name of the governor Gondatti was given to one of the volosts on the Tomsk Railway (part of the Trans-Siberian Railway): Gondatiev volost of the Tomsk Governorate. Now it is the territory of the modern Bolotninsky District.
- From 1912 to 1920, his name (Gondatti) was the city of Shimanovsk – a new station of the Amur railway (part of the Trans-Siberian Railway), the administrative center of the Gondatiev volost of the Amur Oblast.
- In the new district of Tyumen there is Nikolay Gondatti Street (located in the Tyumen microdistrict; the name was given in 2007).
- In the town of Novo-Nikolaevsk, Tomsk Province, in 1909, Gondatti Street was named in his honor (in 1920, it was renamed Uritsky Street).

== List of works ==
Nikolay Gondatti was the author of several printed works, which are mainly reports on his scientific trips.

- Nikolay Gondatti. The cult of the bear of the natives of North-Western Siberia. – Reports of the Society of lovers of Natural Science, Anthropology and Ethnography. – Volume 48, Issue 2. – Moscow, 1888.
- Nikolay Gondatti. Traces of paganism among the natives of North-Western Siberia. – Moscow, 1888.
- Nikolay Gondatti. Traces of pagan beliefs of Manzus. – Reports of the Society of lovers of Natural Science, Anthropology and Ethnography, works of the ethnographic department, volume 8. – Moscow, 1880.
- Nikolay Gondatti. General Report of the Amur Expedition for 1910 – Issue 1. – Saint Petersburg: Vladimir Kirshbaum Printing House, 1911. – 288 pages.

== Photos ==
One of the surviving photos baked a meeting of the Amur Governor-General Nikolay Gondatti with the family Old Believers. The meeting of the Governor-General with Semeiskie Old Believers – settlers from Transbaikalia in one of the villages near the town of Alekseevsk (present-day Svobodny) is depicted. Part of a series of 5 photos. In the foreground is an arch of poles entwined with branches, decorated with tricolor flags. Under the arch, Nikolay Gondatti and his retinue of immigrant officials, on the edges the group of Old Believers.

== Sources ==
- Vsevolod Miller. Materials on adverbs of foreigners of the Anadyr district, collected by Nikolay Gondatti // "Living Antiquity", 1897, issue II, 7th year.
- Nina Dubinina. Amur Governor-General Nikolay Gondatti. – Khabarovsk: Amur Geographical Society, 1997. – 208 pages, illustrated.
- Andrey Yakovenko, Victor Gakhov. Tomsk governors. Tomsk, 2012
- Tatyana Mishunina. Nikolay Lvovich Gondatti (November 21, 1860 – April 05, 1946)
- "Nikolai Lvovich Gondatti". Series "Honorary Citizens of Novosibirsk". Novosibirsk State Regional Library. – Novosibirsk, 1996.
- Gondatti, Nikolay Lvovich // Tomsk from A to Z: A brief encyclopedia of the city / Edited by Doctor of Historical Sciences Nadezhda Dmitrienko. – 1st ed. – Tomsk: NTL Publishing House, 2004. – page 77. – 440 pages. – 3,000 copies – ISBN 5-89503-211-7.
- Conversation with Nikolay Gondatti // Siberian Trade Gazette. Number 243. November 6, 1908. Tyumen.
- Nikolay Gondatti (biography) // Siberian Trade Gazette. Number 216. October 3, 1908. Tyumen.
- On the scholarship of the name of the former governor Nikolay Gondatti // Siberian Trade Gazette. Number 210. September 24, 1908. Tyumen.
- On the scholarship of Nikolay Gondatti // Siberian Trade Gazette. Number 214. September 30, 1908. Tyumen.
- Three years among the Chukchi // Siberian Trade Gazette. Number 67. March 25, 1899. Tyumen.
- Three years among the Chukchi (continued) // Siberian Trade Gazette. Number 73. April 2, 1899. Tyumen.
- Three years among the Chukchi (end) // Siberian Trade Gazette. Number 74. April 3, 1899. Tyumen.
- Nikolay Gondatti // Siberian Trade Gazette. Number 205. September 25, 1911. Tyumen.
