= Nikolay Baranov (1837) =

Nikolay Mikhailovich Baranov
- Николай Михайлович Баранов
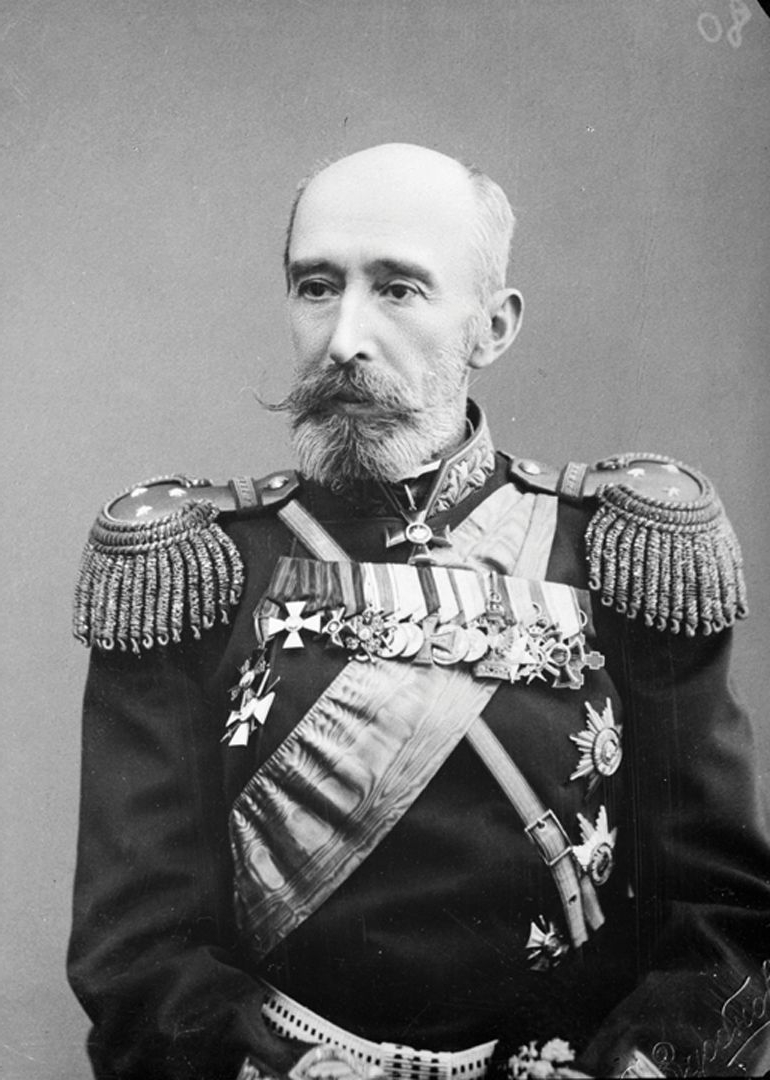

Arkhangelsk Governor
- In office July 16, 1881 – July 27, 1882
- Preceded by: Modest Koniar
- Succeeded by: Pyotr Poltoratsky

Nizhny Novgorod Governor
- In office July 31, 1882 – May 16, 1897
- Preceded by: Nikolay Bezak
- Succeeded by: Pavel Simon Unterberger

Senator
- In office 1897–1901

Personal details
- Born: August 18, 1837 Luchkino Estate, Kologriv Uyezd, Kostroma Governorate, Russian Empire
- Died: August 25, 1901 (aged 64)
- Resting place: Novodevichye Cemetery of Saint Petersburg
- Education: Naval Cadet Corps
- Awards: Order of Saint George; Order of the White Eagle; Order of Saint Vladimir; Order of Saint Anna; Order of Saint Stanislaus

Military service
- Allegiance: Russian Empire
- Branch/service: Navy
- Rank: Captain 1st Rank (1877); Lieutenant General

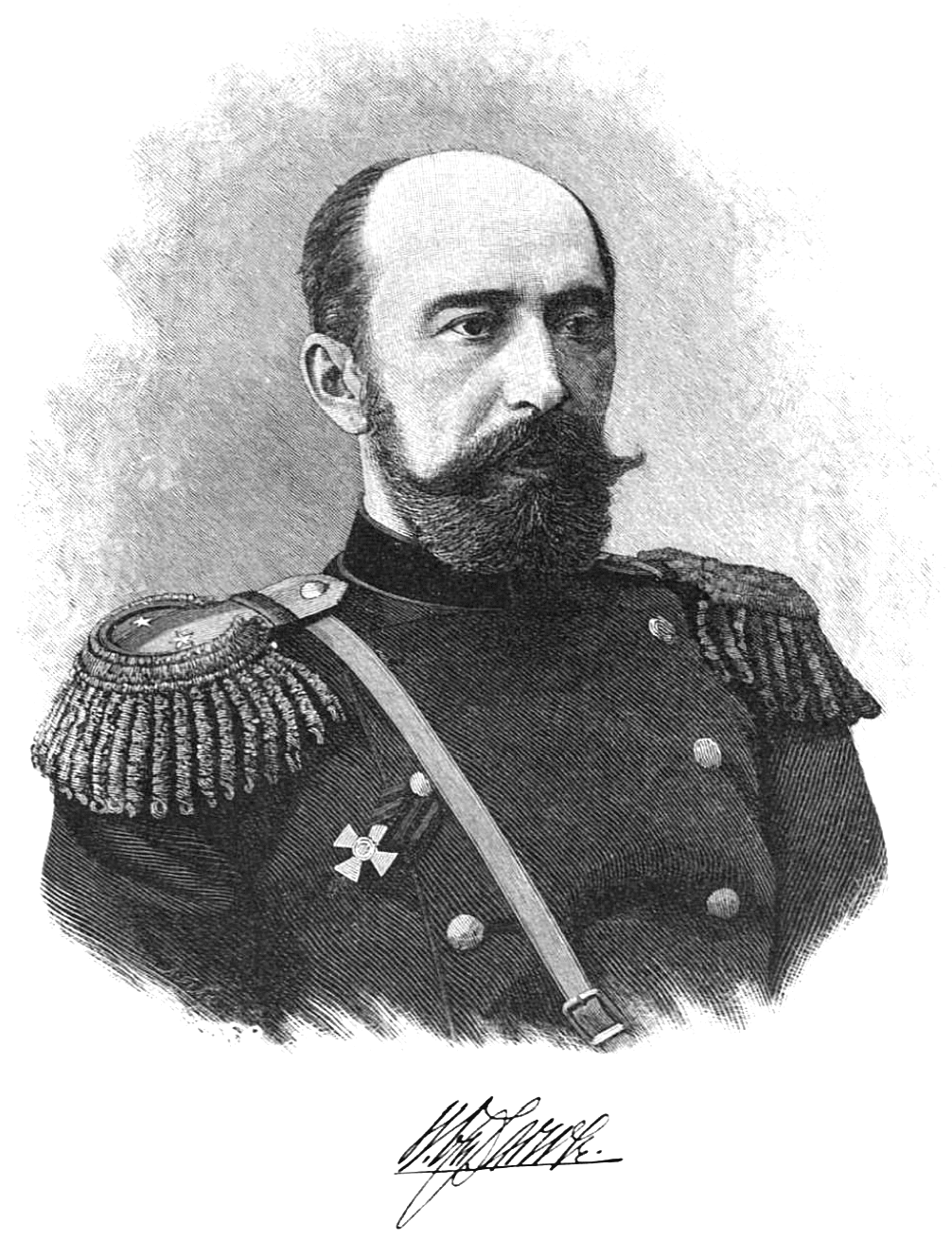
Major General Nikolay Baranov, Governor of Nizhny Novgorod. Engraving of Ad. Boehme from a photograph of David Leibovsky in Nizhny Novgorod (1892)

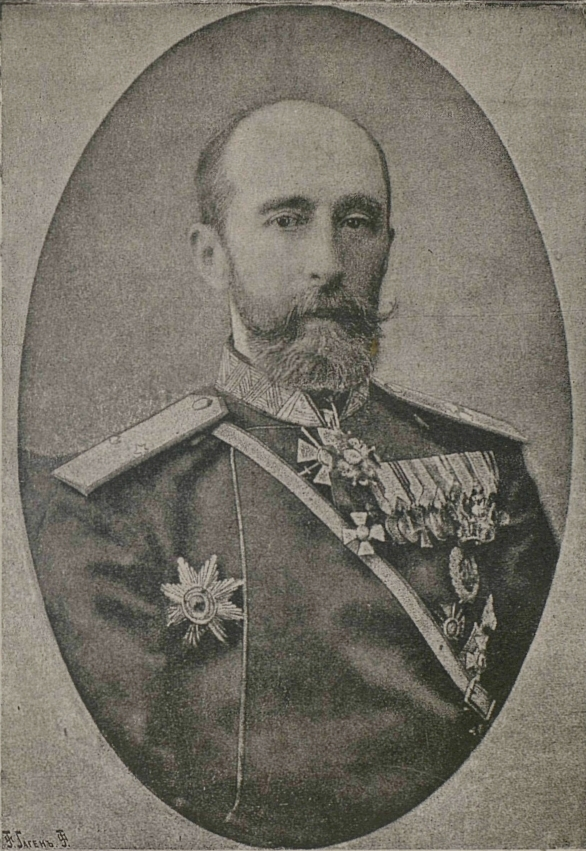
Major General Nikolay Baranov, 1892

Nikolay Mikhailovich Baranov (Russian: Никола́й Миха́йлович Бара́нов; August 6, 1837 – August 12, 1901) was a lieutenant general, Mayor of Saint Petersburg (from March 21 to August 24, 1881), Nizhny Novgorod Military Governor (from July 31, 1882, to May 16, 1897), and a senator. He was also inventor of the Baranov Rifle, Model 1869.

== Biography ==
Baranov was born on the Luchkino Family Estate of the Kologriv Uyezd of the Kostroma Governorate in an old but not rich noble family.

=== Navy career ===
Following the example of his father and uncle, Nikolai Baranov chose the career of a naval officer. Educated at the Naval Cadet Corps, from where he was graduated in 1854. He took part in the Crimean War, in 1856, he was promoted to the first officer's rank. In 1858, he transferred from the navy to the Russian Society of Shipping and Trade, then returned to the navy, headed the model workshop of the Petersburg Port. In 1866–1877, he headed the Maritime Museum, brought it to a brilliant state, was engaged in the creation of naval expositions at various Russian and international exhibitions. He carried out work on deepening the Kronstadt Harbor.

On the eve of the Russian–Turkish War of 1877–1878, he proposed, based on his experience in the Russian Society of Shipping and Trade, to arm and use high–speed commercial ships for attacks on enemy sea communications. He was one of the first to realize such an idea, having received under his command the steamer "Vesta". On July 15, 1877, he was awarded the Order of Saint George of the 4th Degree for the distinction and then granted to the adjutant wing. During the campaign on the Black Sea, this ship withstood an unequal battle with the Turkish battleship "Fehti–Bulen" (another transcription – "Fehti–Bulend"). Subsequently, commanding the steamer "Russia", he seized the Turkish transport "Mersin" with numerous enemy troops. Received all–Russian fame and was promoted to Captain of the 1st Rank. However, this was followed by a scandal: Lieutenant Zinovy Rozhestvensky published an article in which he described the battle as a "shameful flight" and accused Nikolai Baranov of exaggerating the merits of Vesta. In July 1878, a trial of this episode was scheduled, but a year later the Naval Ministry terminated the process against Rozhestvensky, suggesting that Baranov sue the lieutenant for civil insult. The offended captain asked for resignation, but he was refused, after which he submitted a memorandum to General Admiral Grand Duke Konstantin Nikolayevich, in which he listed all the offenses inflicted on him, including the unpaid prize money for the seizure of the Mersina. The enraged General Admiral brought the note to the attention of Alexander II, after which Baranov was put on trial "for indecent and offensive expressions" used in this note. In December 1879, Baranov was found guilty by the Saint Petersburg Naval Court and dismissed from service. On January 14, 1880, "it was most mercifully commanded to consider dismissed from service in consideration of his military merits".

In Saint Petersburg, he lived at 25 Znamenskaya Street.

=== Public service ===
In 1880, at the request of Mikhail Loris–Melikov, Captain 1st Rank Nikolai Baranov was pardoned and transferred to the police, "with the renaming of a colonel", and sent abroad to organize supervision of Russian revolutionaries.

At the beginning of 1881, Baranov was appointed Acting Governor of the Kovno Governorate.

After the assassination of Emperor Alexander II, he took up the post of Saint Petersburg Mayor in March–August 1881, to fight the terror of "Narodnaya Volya". His candidacy to Alexander III was advised by the Chief Prosecutor Konstantin Pobedonostsev, who wrote:

I dare to remind Your Majesty about Baranov. This is a person devoted to you. I know – and able to act when needed.
Here in Saint Petersburg people may be found. Baranov will come here tomorrow; I dare to say once again that this man can render a great service to Your Majesty, and I have moral authority over him.

The metropolitan police, together with the gendarmes, arrested everyone who, in one way or another, was involved in the murder of the emperor. Five of the main terrorists were publicly executed on the Semyonovsky Parade Ground, the rest received various sentences.

It seems that even under the patronage of the future Emperor Alexander III, when he was the heir, just shortly before the first of March, Baranov was again involved in the service, but not in the naval service, but in the military; he was made general and appointed governor of Grodno. After Grodno, when Emperor Alexander III ascended the throne, since Saint Petersburg was very restless at that time, some revolutionary attacks were made, then Baranov from Grodno was transferred as mayor here to Saint Petersburg. He was the mayor for a very short time, performed various tricks and, in the end, could not get along with the mayor, although Konstantin Petrovich Pobedonostsev was very supportive of him all the time.

— Sergey Witte. Memories

After resigning from the post of Saint Petersburg Mayor, he tried to return to "big politics", proposing various projects. Later he was appointed governor of Arkhangelsk.

In 1882–1897, the Nizhny Novgorod Governor. In Nizhny Novgorod, Baranov was not called "eagle" for nothing, because they knew that Baranov always took responsibility and knew how to protect his subordinates. He was the first to call the consequences of the poor harvest of 1891 a famine, and he fought against this famine as required by emergency circumstances. Formally acting "outside the law", Baranov saved his province. When a cholera epidemic began in Nizhny Novgorod in 1892, Baranov, with the same decisiveness, with the same enthusiasm, saved the All–Russian Fair not only from the epidemic, but also from the panic associated with it. On the Volga, floating hospitals–barracks were organized; when there was not enough space in them, Baranov, without hesitation, took his residence under the cholera hospital. When the first signs of cholera riots appeared, Baranov gave a short order:

I will hang the instigators in front of everyone and on the spot.

A man with an iron will in matters to which he attached importance to the state, Baranov in his private life was a gentle and extremely kind person. All in debt, pawning his own things, he helped not only his acquaintances, but even more often his subordinates. Respect for the press was a characteristic feature of Baranov. Perfectly owning the pen, he appeared with articles in periodicals at different times and on different issues. He insisted that the newspapers print accurate information about the course of the epidemic at a time when these figures were hidden in other cities: Baranov himself believed and knew how to convince others that truth saves, and lies and deception always only ruin.

Since 1897 – Senator.

Some contemporaries considered him a tyrant, an intriguer, a charlatan, but others were convinced that Baranov...

With his amazing activity, tireless work and reasonable manner of action, he showed the whole of Russia a clear example of what an administrator who really stands at the height of his appointment and is constantly guarding the interests of the government and society can create.

He died on July 30, 1901, abroad, was buried at the Novodevichy Cemetery in Saint Petersburg; the grave is lost. The grandson, Nikolai Voronovich, devoted several chapters to his grandfather in his memoirs.

== Interesting Facts ==
- At the post of Saint Petersburg Mayor, Nikolay Baranov established a special elective "council of twenty–five" (publicly known as the "Sheep Parliament"), which had two subcommittees: for organizing "under His Majesty's special guard" and for creating an artel of janitors. A special commission was created "on measures against the conduct of undermining" and "on the definition of the duties of the police and janitors for external supervision of houses". The "Sheep Parliament" did not produce any results and was soon disbanded.
- In memory of Nikolay Baranov, one of the destroyers of the Imperial Black Sea Fleet bore the name "Lieutenant–Commander Baranov" (launched in 1907, on June 18, 1918, sunk by the crew in the Novorossiysk Bay).

== Sources ==
- "Baranov Nikolay Mikhailovich". List of Generals by Seniority. Done Until May 1, 1901. Saint Petersburg: Military Typography. 1901. p. 225.
- Baranov Nikolay Mikhailovich // Military Encyclopedia: In 18 Volumes / Edited by Vasily Novitsky ... and Others – Saint Petersburg; Moscow: Printing House of the Ivan Sytin Partnership, 1911–1915
- Vyacheslav Bondarenko. 100 Great Deeds of Russia – Moscow, 2011
- Leonid Feigin. Nizhny Novgorod Governor, Major General Nikolai Mikhailovich Baranov: Biographical Information and an Overview of His Activities – Moscow, 1892
- Veniamin Stepanov. Lieutenant Commander Baranov – Odessa, 1909
- Yakov Dlugolensky. Civil–Military and Police Authorities in Saint Petersburg, 1703–1917 – Saint Petersburg, 2001. Pages 350–358
- Vladimir Vrubel. A Feat That Did Not Exist
- Captain of the 2nd Rank Nikolay Baranov and the Battle of the Steamer Vesta With a Turkish Battleship // Heroes and Figures of the Russian–Turkish War of 1877–1878 – Edition of Vasily Turba – Saint Petersburg, 1878 – Pages 55–60
- Valentin Pikul. Historical Miniatures. Be in Charge of the Fair. Publisher: AST, Veche, ISBN 5-17-010666-1, 2002
