= Paul Simon Unterberger =

Russo-German military governor (1842–1921)

- Lieutenant-General Paul Simon Unterberger in a Cossack uniform

7th Priamursky Governor-General
- In office November 18, 1905 – December 6, 1910
- Preceded by: Rostislav Khreschatitsky
- Succeeded by: Nikolay Gondatti

Nizhny Novgorod Governor
- In office May 28, 1897 – November 18, 1905
- Preceded by: Nikolay Baranov
- Succeeded by: Konstantin Frederiks

Military Governor of the Primorskaya Oblast and the ataman of the Ussuri Cossack Host
- In office October 1, 1888 – May 27, 1897
- Preceded by: Iosif Baranov
- Succeeded by: Dejan Subotić

Personal details
- Born: Paul Simon Unterberger; August 21 [O.S. 9] 1842 Simbirsk, Simbirsk Governorate, Russian Empire
- Died: February 12, 1921 (aged 78) Remplin Castle, Remplin, Mecklenburg-Schwerin, Weimar Republic
- Spouse: Emilie Luise Erdmann
- Children: 5
- Parent: Heinrich Friedrich Simon Unterberger (father)
- Education: Military Engineering-Technical University, Nikolaev Engineering School
- Awards: Order of the White Eagle; Order of Saint Anna; Order of Saint Vladimir; Order of Saint Stanislaus; Order of Saint Alexander Nevsky

Military service
- Branch/service: Military engineering
- Years of service: 1860–1910
- Rank: General Engineer

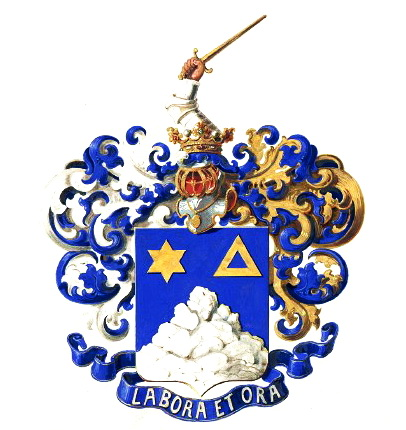
Coat of arms of the Unterbergers of 1890, in the General Armorial of the Noble Families of the Russian Empire

Paul Simon Unterberger (Russian: Па́вел Фёдорович У́нтербе́ргер, tr. Pável Fyodorovich Uńterbérger; August 21, 1842, Simbirsk, Russian Empire – February 12, 1921, Remplin, Weimar Republic) was a Russo-German military and state leader, military governor of the Primorskaya Oblast (1888–1897), Nizhny Novgorod Governor (1897–1905), Military ataman of the Ussuri Cossack Host, Amur Governor-General (1905–1910), General Engineer (December 6, 1906).

His other names are Pavel Fridrikhovich, Pavel-Simon and Simon Fridrikhovich Unterberger.

== Biography ==
Paul was born on August 21, 1842, to Heinrich Friedrich Simon Unterberger and Marie Rudolph. His father, the son of the carriage master from Riga, was one of the founders of the veterinary service of the Russian Empire, for which he was ennobled.

His ancestors had been Austrian Protestants from Salzburg. For religious reasons they moved to Prussia in the early 18th Century. His grandfather Simon Thomas Unterberger moved to Riga in the early 19th Century. After the Russian Revolutions, most members of the family, including Paul, moved back to the homeland of their ancestors.

In 1849, together with his father, Paul moved to Dorpat, where his father and uncle were appointed professors of the University of Dorpat. He graduated from the classical gymnasium.

In 1860 he entered the Nikolaev Engineering School, from which he graduated in 1862 as a second lieutenant. In 1868 he graduated from the Nikolaev Academy of Engineering in the first category with the rank of staff captain. After graduating from the academy, he was sent on a business trip to Europe, then left at the academy for teaching and research work.

In the years 1870–1871, Paul Simon Unterberger, in the rank of captain, was seconded to Turkestan to take part in a military campaign. After the campaign, he lost interest in academia and went to serve in Eastern Siberia.

In 1875–1877, in the rank of lieutenant colonel, he served in Irkutsk as a staff officer for special assignments under the district engineering department of the East Siberian Military District. He was engaged in construction work in the underdeveloped areas of the Far East. He conducted a large research work, studying the military geography of the territories included in the East Siberian governorship. During the uprising in Mongolia, he was seconded to Urga for the construction of fortifications at the Russian embassy. Then, overcoming difficulties, he proceeded for research purposes (as a specialist in military geography) through Mongolia and the Gobi Desert, visited Beijing, Tianjin, Shanghai, Hong Kong, and Japan.

One of the goals of the trip was to hire 134 workers in China for construction in the Khabarovka post area. Under the terms of the contract, workers were hired for 2 years.

In 1877–1878, he served as chairman of the Irkutsk Provisional Military Prison Commission. In April 1878, he was promoted to colonel and appointed head of the engineering part of the East Siberian Military District. He was engaged in the fortification of Nikolaevsk and especially of Vladivostok, where he initiated a large-scale construction plan for the Vladivostok Fortress. In 1879, he again visited Vladivostok and completed the development of a plan for the deployment of defensive structures.

On October 1, 1888, Unterberger was appointed military governor of the Primorskaya Oblast and commander of the Ussuri Cossack Host. On August 30, 1889, a fortress flag was raised over the fortifications of Vladivostok in connection with obtaining the status of a fortress of the 2nd rank. The role of Vladivostok increased, and in August 1890 the seat of the military governor of the Primorsky region and the regional administration was transferred from Khabarovsk to Vladivostok. In 1896 Unterberger received the rank of lieutenant general.

Paul Unterberger spent almost 9 years as a military governor of the Primorskaya Oblast. During this time, with his participation or with his knowledge, the Ussuriysk railway, port, floating and coastal docks, many residential and office buildings were built, medical and educational institutions were put into operation, trade developed, shipping on the coastal coast was established, nautical classes were initiated, large deposits of coal were discovered in Suchan and mining began, many settlements in the Primorye territory were founded.

In 1897, Unterberger was appointed governor of Nizhny Novgorod. When in May 1897, Pavel Unterberger handed over his affairs to the military governor of the Primorskaya Oblast, General Dean Subbotich, the city duma of Vladivostok, noting his services to the city, made him an honorary citizen of Vladivostok.

In Nizhny Novgorod, Unterberger made an impression with civil engineering and social activities: he built stone moorings, arranged places for mooring vessels. He initiated the redemption of the Boldin estate of Alexander Pushkin in order to create a state memorial museum. He also initiated the creation of the Nizhny Novgorod Society of Art Lovers. He was a member of 29 charitable societies, to which he regularly paid considerable contributions.

A demonstration took place during his governorship in Sormovo, and Peter Zalomov was arrested. The severity of the measures against the revolutionaries intensified the efforts of the Social Revolutionaries who, led by Boris Savinkov, were preparing an attempt on the Nizhny Novgorod governor.

Unterberger stayed in the post of the Nizhny Novgorod governor until the beginning of November 1905. A few days before the end of the governorship, he was promoted to senator.

On November 8, 1905, Lieutenant-General Paul Unterberger was appointed commander of the Amur Military District and ataman of the Amur Cossack troops, and 10 days later he was appointed Amur Governor-General. As governor-general, he made efforts to develop and settle the region. With his participation, new educational and medical institutions, including rural ones, were put into operation, development of polymetallic ores in Tetyukh was started, fisheries supervision was introduced, the Kamchatka and the Commander Islands were separated from the regional administration of the Primorsk region, new settlements were initiated. He contributed to the activities of Vladimir Arsenyev.

In foreign policy issues, he adhered to conservative positions, was extremely wary of Japan, despite the Russian-Japanese rapprochement after the Russo-Japanese War and the signing of a number of bilateral agreements of a general political and economic nature. He was also a strong opponent of the migration of Koreans to the Russian Far East. In 1910, on his initiative, a cross was installed in honor of Semyon Dezhnev at Cape Dezhnev.

Unterberger completed his service in the Far East on December 6, 1910, at the age of 68. He passed his duties to the Grand Master of the Stables Nikolai Gondatti and departed for Petersburg, where he was appointed a member of the State Council on December 6, 1910.

In 1912, Paul Unterberger published the work "The Amur Region. 1906–1910" on the basis of materials collected during his service.

After the revolution, Unterberger went to Germany to live with his wife, his daughter Maria and her husband, and he became manager at Remplin Castle, where he died at the age of 78.

== Awards and titles ==
Unterberger was a knight of many orders, including St. Stanislav, 1st class, St. Anna, 1st class, St. Vladimir, 2nd class, White Eagle, St. Alexander Nevsky with diamond.

On June 3, 1897, he was awarded the title of Honorary Citizen of the city of Vladivostok.

In 1902, the annual meeting of the Russian Geographical Society awarded Pavel Unterberger a small gold medal for his work "Primorskaya Oblast. 1856–1898".

== Bibliography ==
- Unterberger, Pavel (1900). Primorskaya Oblast. 1856–1898. Essay. Saint Petersburg. p. 324.
- Unterberger, Pavel (1912). Amur Region. 1906–1910. Essay. Saint Petersburg. p. 428.

== Tributes to Pavel Unterberger ==
- In honor of Pavel Fedorovich Unterberger (then – the ataman of the Ussuriysk Cossack Army), the Cossack village of Pavlo-Fedorovsky (now the village of Pavlo-Fedorovka of Primorsky Krai) founded in 1895 was named.
- In 1987, the name of Unterberger was immortalized on a memorial plaque "Figures of the Society for the Study of the Amur Territory – Primorsky Branch of the Geographical Society of the USSR" (Vladivostok, Peter the Great Street, 4).
- A memorial plaque on the facade of the former house of the governor-general (Vladivostok, Svetlanskaya Street, 52) tells about him.
- The mountain on the Muravyov-Amursky Peninsula in the south of Primorsky Krai is named after Unterberger.

== Sources ==
- Roman Avilov. Memories of Peter Pavlovich Unterberger as a source on the history of the Far Eastern Exodus // Vladivostok – the point of return: the past and the present of Russian emigration: international scientific conference, Vladivostok, October 6–8, 2014: program and theses. – Vladivostok: Far Eastern Federal University, 2014. p. 22–23.
- Roman Avilov. Working with the family archive of military émigré engineer Peter Unterberger in the study of the Vladivostok fortress // Vladivostok – point of return: the past and the present of Russian emigration: materials of the Second International Scientific Conference (Vladivostok, October 12–14, 2016) – Khabarovsk: editorial and publishing department Far Eastern Law Institute, Ministry of Internal Affairs of Russia, 2017. p. 11–18.
- Pavel Fedorovich Unterberger // Roman Avilov, Nikolay Ayushin, Vladimir Kalinin. Vladivostok fortress: troops, fortification, events, people. Part I. "Out of spite of the arrogant neighbor". 1860–1905 Vladivostok: Dalnauka, 2013. – p. 287-313.
- Dubinina, Nina (2008). Amur Governor-General Pavel Unterberger. Documentary and historical narration. Khabarovsk: RIOTIP. p. 400.
- Tatyana Ivanova. Worthy of a special monument: [Pavel Unterberger] [Text] / Tatyana Ivanova // Nizhny Novgorod worker. – 2001. – October 26 (No. 214).
- Vladimir Kalinin, Nikolay Ayushin. Governor // Russia and the Asia-Pacific Region. – 2000. – No. 2. – p. 112-121.
- Igor Makarov. "The measure proposed by the governor could lead to serious unrest". Pavel Friedrikhovich Unterberger. 1897–1905 [Text] / Igor Makarov // Igor Makarov. Governors and police chiefs: Nizhny Novgorod were. – Nizhny Novgorod: Publishing house "Books", 2005. – p. 268-277.
- Marine biographical directory of the Far East of Russia and Russian America. XVII – early XX centuries. – Vladivostok, 1998. – p. 187-188.
- Amir Khisamutdinov. "Do not lose faith in the Russian people" (On the activities of Pavel Unterberger in Primorye, including friendship with Vladimir Arsenyev) // Red flag. – 1990. – December 2 – p. 11.
- Hang Jun, Lee (2006). Governor-General of the Amur Region, Pavel Fedorovich Unterberger and his Korean policy. Moscow: MAX Press. p. 114. ISBN 978-5-317-01598-5.
- Welding, Olaf. Baltic German Biographical Dictionary 1710-1960. (1970), from the Baltic Biographical Dictionary Digital

Preceded by Nikolay Baranov	Nizhny Novgorod Governor; 1897–1905	Succeeded by Konstantin Frederiks
Preceded by Rostislav Khreschatitsky	Amur Governor-General; 1905–1910; Subordinate territory – Amur region	Succeeded by Nikolay Gondatti
