= Amur Military District =

Military district of the Russian Empire

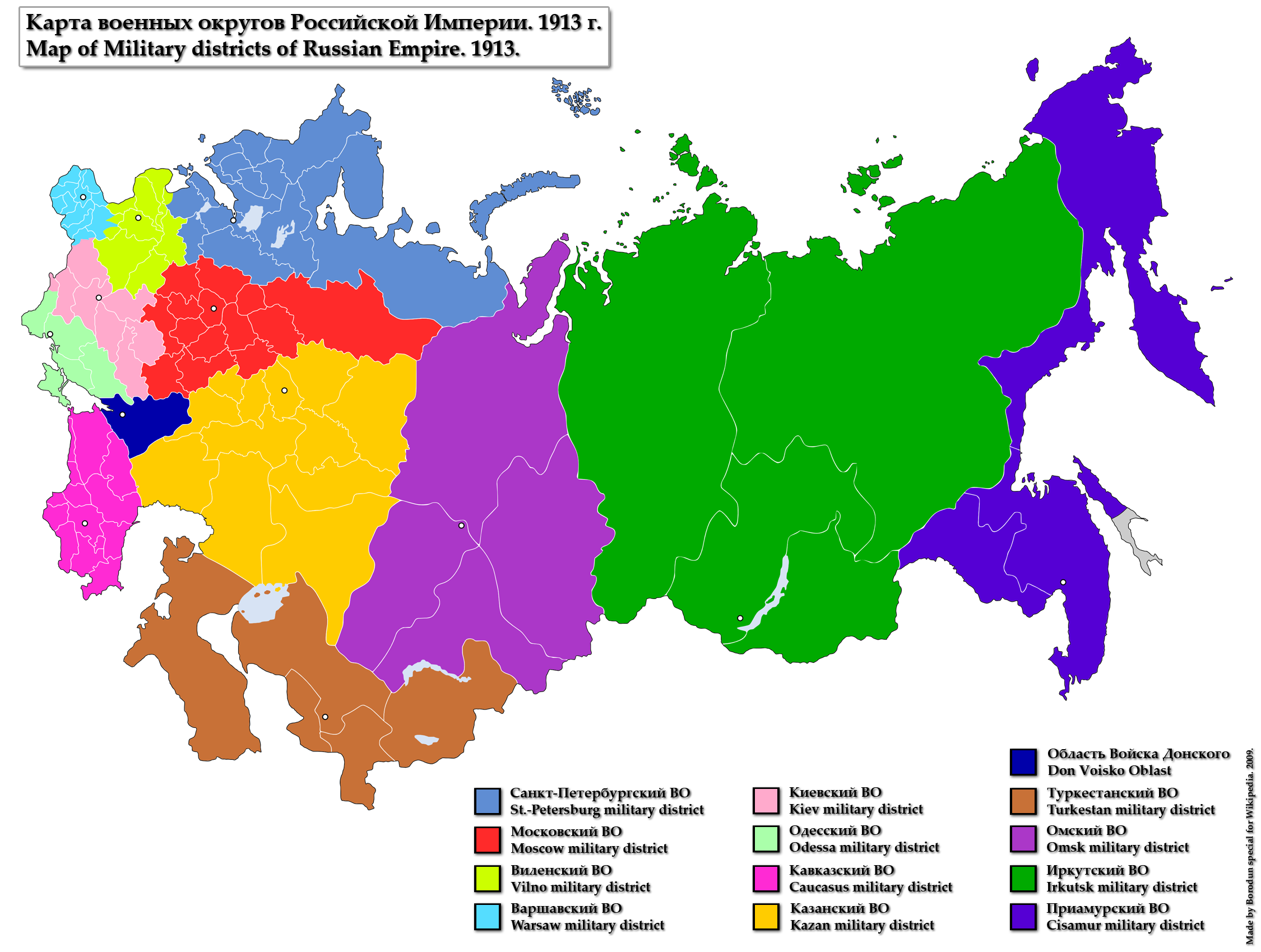
Amur Military District (1913) is the most eastern district on the map

The Amur Military District or Priamur Military District (Приамурский военный округ) was a Military district of the Russian Empire, which existed between 1884 and 1919.

== History ==
The Amur Military District was formed on May 20 (June 1) 1884, when the East Siberian Military District, originally formed in 1864, was divided into two separate military districts : the Irkutsk Military District and the Amur Military District. The center of the new district was the city of Khabarovsk.

After the Japanese-Chinese War of 1894–1895, and the emergence of Japan as a new military power into the Far Eastern arena, the position of the district changed dramatically. It became obvious that in the future, a clash between the Russian and Japanese empires would become more and more likely. A gradual strengthening of the troops in the sparsely populated Amur Military District began. By 1898, the Primorsky Dragoon Regiment was created and construction of the Vladivostok Fortress was started.

In the period between the Russian-Japanese War of 1904-1905 and the First World War 1914–1918, the troops of the district underwent serious transformations, In the spring of 1906, the Transbaikal Region was removed from the Amur Military District and added to the Irkutsk Military District. In the same year the Amur Military Flotilla was created to strengthen the defense of the border in the Amur basin and the mouth of the river.

With the outbreak of the First World War, most of the district's field troops, namely the 1st, 4th and 5th Siberian Army Corps, were sent to the Western Front.

After the February Revolution, the district was disbanded, but the commander remained in place until 31 May 1917.
The former military district would become the theater of the Russian Civil War and the Siberian Intervention.

== District Commanders ==
- Adjutant General, General of Infantry, Baron Andrey Korf (1884–1893),
- Lieutenant General Sergei Mikhailovich Dukhovsky (1893–1898),
- Lieutenant General (from 1900 - General of Infantry) Nikolai Ivanovich Grodekov (1898–1902),
- Lieutenant General Dejan Subotić (1902–1903),
- General of Infantry Nikolai Linevich (1903–1904),
- General of the cavalry Rostislav Aleksandrovich Khreschatitsky (1904–1905),
- Lieutenant General, (from 1906 - Engineer-General) Paul Simon Unterberger (1905–1910),
- Lieutenant General (from 1913 - General of Infantry) Platon Lechitsky (1910–1914),
- General of artillery Arkady Nikanorovich Nishenkov (1914- 31 May 1917).

== Sources ==
- the article in the Russian Wikipedia, Приамурский военный округ (Российская империя).
