= Russian Far East =

Geographical region

- Far Eastern Federal District (highlighted)
- Largest city: Khabarovsk
- Administrative centre: Vladivostok

Area
  - Total: 6,952,600 km^{2} (2,684,400 sq mi)

Population (2021)
  - Total: 7,975,762
  - Density: 1.1472/km^{2} (2.9711/sq mi)

The Russian Far East is a region in North Asia. It is the easternmost part of Russia and the Asian continent, and is coextensive with the Far Eastern Federal District, which encompasses the area between Lake Baikal and the Pacific Ocean. The area's largest city is Khabarovsk, followed by Vladivostok (which has served as the federal district's administrative center since 2018). The region shares international land borders with Mongolia, China, and North Korea to its south, as well as maritime boundaries with Japan to its southeast, and with the United States along the Bering Strait to its northeast.

Although foreign sources often consider the Russian Far East to be a part of Siberia, it has historically been categorized separately from Siberia in Russian regional and cultural schemes.

== Terminology ==
In Russia, the region is usually referred to as simply the Far East (Note: Russian: Дальний Восток, romanized: Dal'niy Vostok, IPA: [ˈdalʲnʲɪj vɐˈstok]). What is known in English as the Far East is usually referred to as the Asia-Pacific Region (Note: Russian: Азиатско-Тихоокеанский регион, romanized: Aziatsko-Tikhookeanskiy region, abbreviated АТР, ATR), or East Asia (Note: Russian: Восточная Азия, romanized: Vostochnaya Aziya), depending on the context.

== Geographical features ==
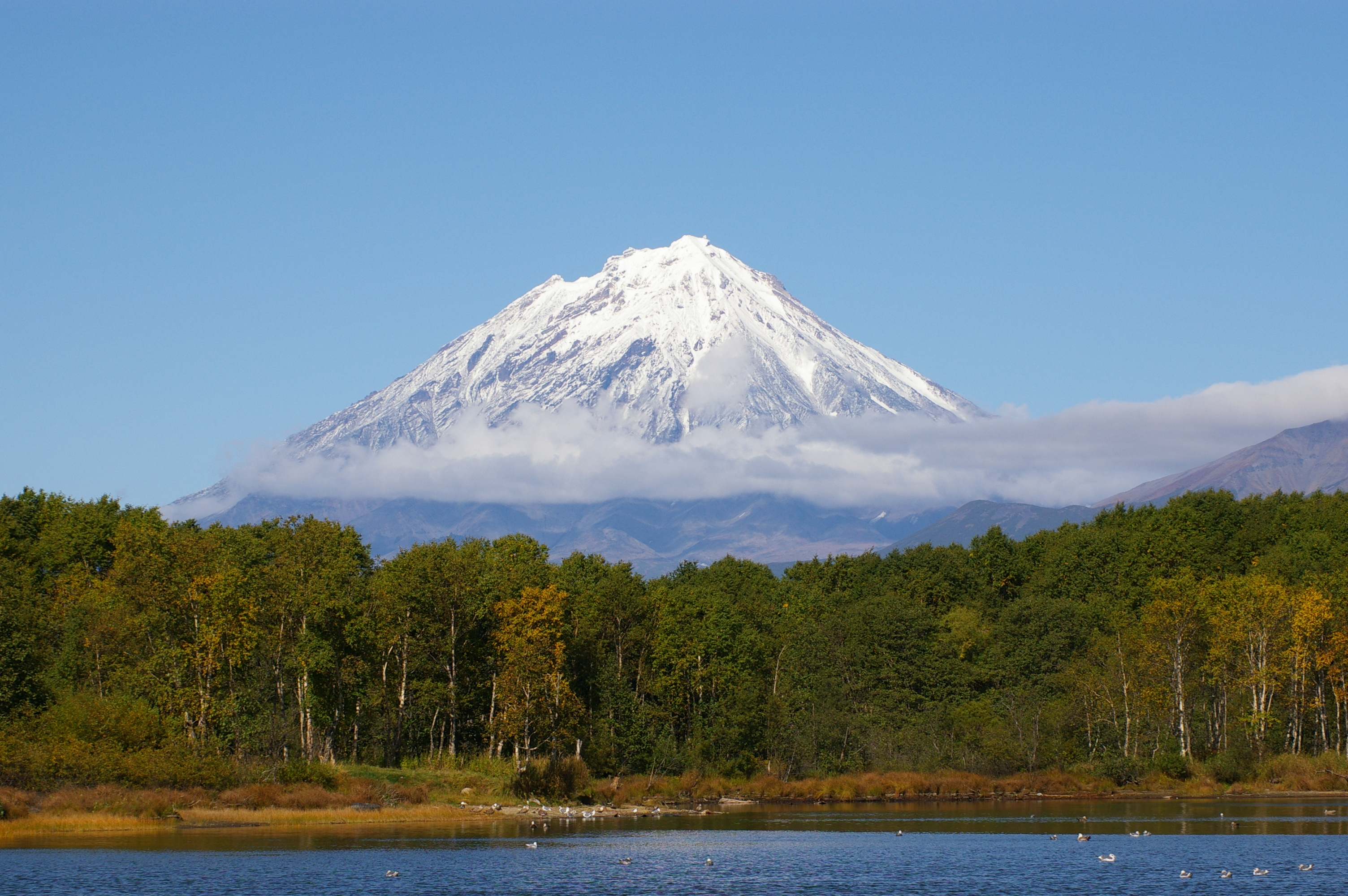
Koryaksky volcano, in Kamchatka

- Amur River
- Lena River
- Lake Baikal
- Klyuchevskaya Sopka volcano
- Kuril–Kamchatka Trench
- Sikhote-Alin mountain range

== History ==
=== Russian expansion ===
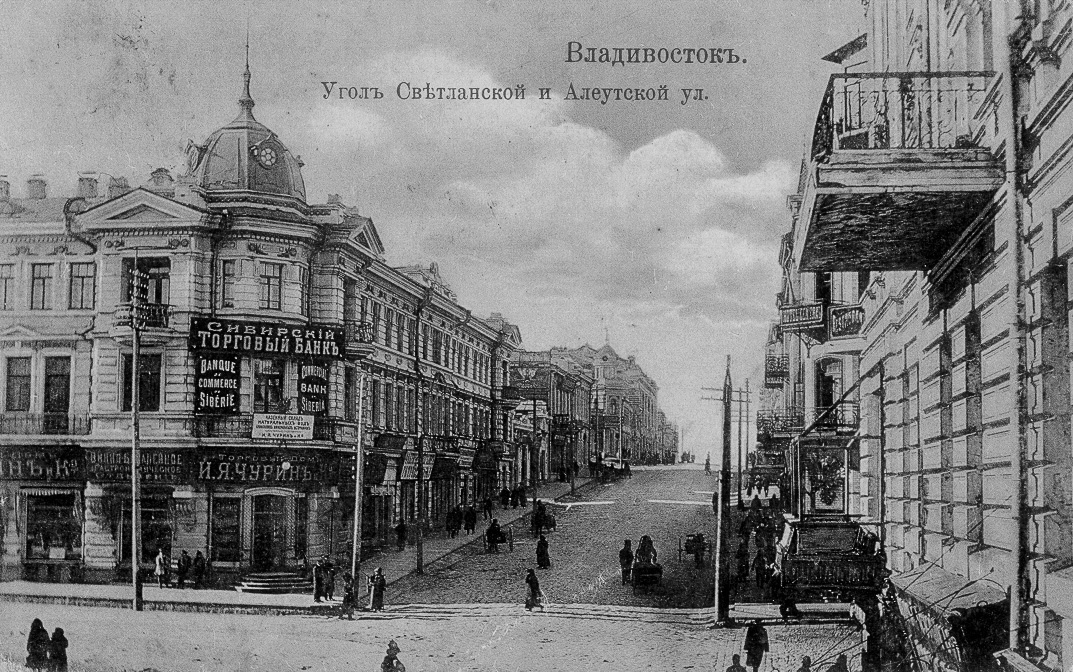
Vladivostok in the early 1900s

Russians reached the Pacific coast in 1647 with the establishment of Okhotsk, and the Russian Empire consolidated its control over the Russian Far East in the 19th century, after the annexation of part of Chinese Manchuria (1858–1860). Primorskaya Oblast was established as a separate administrative division of the Russian Empire in 1856, with its administrative center at Nikolayevsk-on-Amur (moved to Khabarovsk in 1880).

=== Administrative history ===
Several entities with the name "Far East" existed in the first half of the 20th century, all with rather different boundaries:

- 1920–1922: the Far Eastern Republic, which included Transbaikal, Amur, Primorskaya, and Kamchatka Oblasts and northern Sakhalin;
- 1922–1926: Far-Eastern Oblast, which included the Amur, Transbaikal and Kamchatka Governorates and others;
- 1926–1938: Far-Eastern Krai, which included the present-day Primorsky and Khabarovsk Krais.

Until 2000 the Russian Far East lacked officially defined boundaries. A single term "Siberia and the Far East" (Сибирь и Дальний Восток) often referred to Russia's regions east of the Ural Mountains without drawing a clear distinction between "Siberia" and "the Far East".

In 2000 Russia's federal subjects were grouped into larger federal districts, one of which, the Far Eastern Federal District, comprised Amur Oblast, the Chukotka Autonomous Okrug, the Jewish Autonomous Oblast, Kamchatka Oblast with the Koryak Autonomous Okrug, Khabarovsk Krai, Magadan Oblast, Primorsky Krai, the Sakha (Yakutia) Republic, and Sakhalin Oblast. In November 2018 Zabaykalsky Krai and the Republic of Buryatia were added; they had previously formed part of the Siberian Federal District. Since 2000, Russians have increasingly used the term "Far East" to refer to the federal district, though the term is often also used more loosely.

Defined by the boundaries of the federal district, the Far East has an area of 6.95 million square kilometres (2,680,000 sq mi)—over one-third of Russia's total area.

=== Russo-Japanese War ===
Russia in the early 1900s persistently sought a warm-water port on the Pacific Ocean for the Imperial Russian Navy as well as to facilitate maritime trade. The recently established Pacific seaport of Vladivostok (founded in 1860) was operational only during the summer season, but Port Arthur (leased by Russia from China from 1896 onward) in Manchuria could operate all year. After the First Sino-Japanese War (1894–1895) and the failure of the 1903 negotiations between Japan and the Tsar Nicholas II's government, Japan chose war to protect its domination of Korea and adjacent territories. Russia, meanwhile, saw war as a means of distracting its populace from government repression and of rallying patriotism in the aftermath of several general strikes. Japan issued a declaration of war on 8 February 1904. Three hours before Japan's declaration of war was received by the Russian government, the Imperial Japanese Navy attacked the Russian 1st Pacific Squadron at Port Arthur. Eight days later Russia declared war on Japan.

The war ended in September 1905 with a Japanese victory following the fall of Port Arthur and the failed Russian invasion of Japan through the Korean Peninsula and Northeast China; also, Japan had threatened to invade Primorsky Krai via Korea. The warring parties signed the Treaty of Portsmouth on 5 September 1905, and both Japan and Russia agreed to evacuate Manchuria and to return its sovereignty to China, but Japan was allowed to lease the Liaodong Peninsula (containing Port Arthur and Talien, aka Kwantung Leased Territory), and the Russian rail system in southern Manchuria with its access to strategic resources. Japan also received the southern half of the island of Sakhalin from Russia. In 1907, following the war, Russian authorities placed restrictions on Korean settlement and land tenure in border districts amid geopolitical concerns.

=== Soviet era ===
Between 1937 and 1939, the Soviet Union under Joseph Stalin deported over 200,000 Koreans to Uzbekistan and Kazakhstan, fearing that the Koreans might act as spies for Japan. Many Koreans died on the way in cattle trains due to starvation, illness, or freezing conditions. Soviet authorities purged and executed many community leaders; Koryo-saram were not allowed to travel outside of Central Asia for the next 15 years. Korean-language schools were closed in 1938 and instruction shifted to Russian, though spoken Koryo-mar survived in everyday use.

Development of numerous remote locations in the region relied on Gulag labour camps during Stalin's rule, especially in its northern half. After the death of Stalin in 1953 the large-scale use of forced labour waned and was superseded by volunteer employees attracted by relatively high wages.

==== Soviet–Japanese conflicts ====
During the Japanese invasion of Manchuria in 1931, the Soviets occupied Bolshoy Ussuriysky Island, Yinlong Island, and several adjacent islets to separate the city of Khabarovsk from the territory controlled by a possibly hostile power.

Indeed, Japan turned its military attention to Soviet territories. Conflicts between the Japanese and the Soviets frequently happened on the border of Manchuria between 1938 and 1945. The first confrontation occurred in Primorsky Krai, the Battle of Lake Khasan (July–August 1938) involved an attempted military incursion of Japanese-controlled Manchukuo into territory claimed by the Soviet Union. This incursion was founded in the beliefs of the Japanese side that the Soviet Union had misinterpreted the demarcation of the boundary based on the 1860 Treaty of Peking between Imperial Russia and Manchu China. Primorsky Krai was always threatened by a Japanese invasion despite the fact that most of the remaining clashes occurred in Manchukuo.

The clashes ended shortly before and after the conclusion of World War II (see Soviet–Japanese War) when a war-weakened Japan found its territories of Manchukuo, Mengjiang, Korea, and South Sakhalin invaded by Soviet and Mongolian troops (August 1945).

==== World War II ====
The Soviet Union and Japan maintained neutrality throughout most of World War II under the 1941 Soviet–Japanese Neutrality Pact. In August 1945, following the Yalta Conference, the Soviet Union launched the invasion of Manchuria, using Primorsky Krai and Transbaikal as staging grounds for operations across northeastern China and northern Korea.

After the Soviet invasion, the USSR returned Manchukuo and Mengjiang to China; Korea became liberated. The Soviet Union also occupied and annexed Japan's Kuril Islands and southern Sakhalin. The planned Soviet invasion of Japan proper never happened.

==== Cold War ====
During the Korean War, Primorsky Krai became the site of extreme security concern for the Soviet Union.

Vladivostok was the site of the Strategic Arms Limitation Talks in 1974. At the time, the Soviet Union and the United States decided quantitative limits on various nuclear weapons systems and banned the construction of new land-based ICBM launchers. In 1952, Vladivostok and several other cities in Primorsky Krai became closed cities due to the expansion of the Soviet Pacific Fleet.

Incursions of American reconnaissance aircraft from Alaska sometimes happened. Concerns of the Soviet military caused the infamous Korean Air Lines Flight 007 incident in 1983.

=== Russian Federation ===
In 2016, Russia enacted the Law on the Far Eastern Hectare, granting citizens one hectare (2.5 acres) of free land in the region to encourage resettlement.

== Demographics ==
=== Population ===
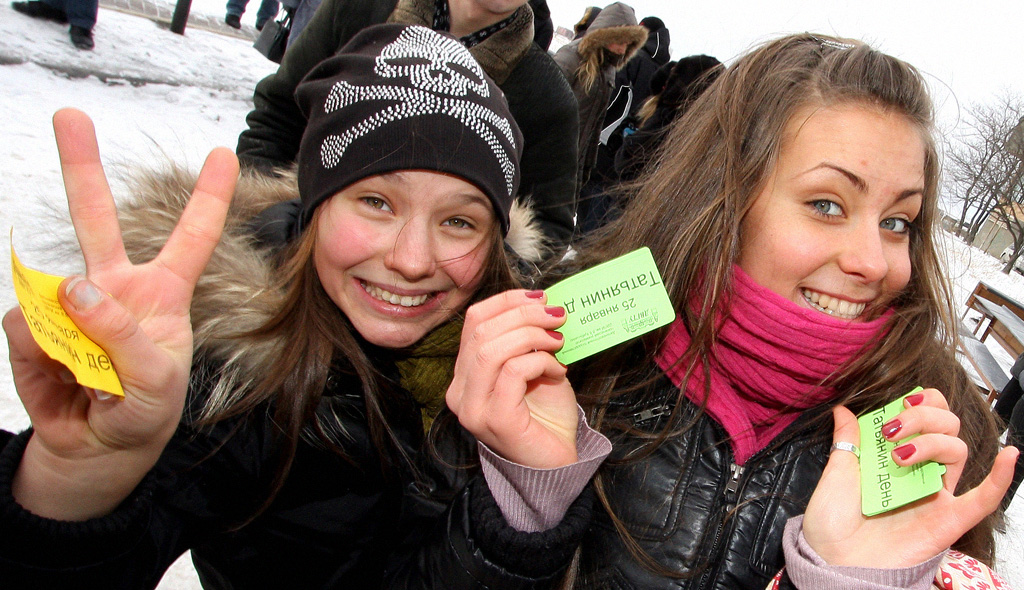
Students in Vladivostok celebrating St. Tatyana's Day, or Russian Students Day (2009)

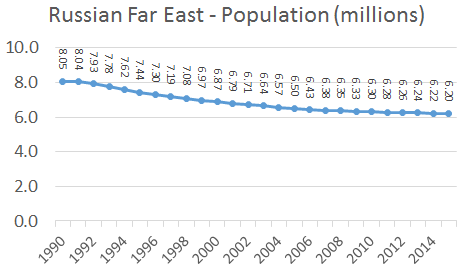
Graph depicting population change in the Russian Far East

According to the 2021 census, the Far Eastern Federal District had a population of 7.98 million. Most of it is concentrated in the southern parts. Given the vast territory of the Russian Far East, 7.98 million people translates to slightly more than one person per square kilometre, making the Russian Far East one of the most sparsely populated areas in the world. The population of the Russian Far East declined significantly following the dissolution of the Soviet Union, dropping by roughly 14% between 1991 and 2010. The Russian government has introduced several programs to stem depopulation, aiming to attract settlers from the near abroad and other regions of Russia.

Ethnic Russians make up the vast majority of the population.

=== Cities ===
75% of the population is urban. The largest cities are:

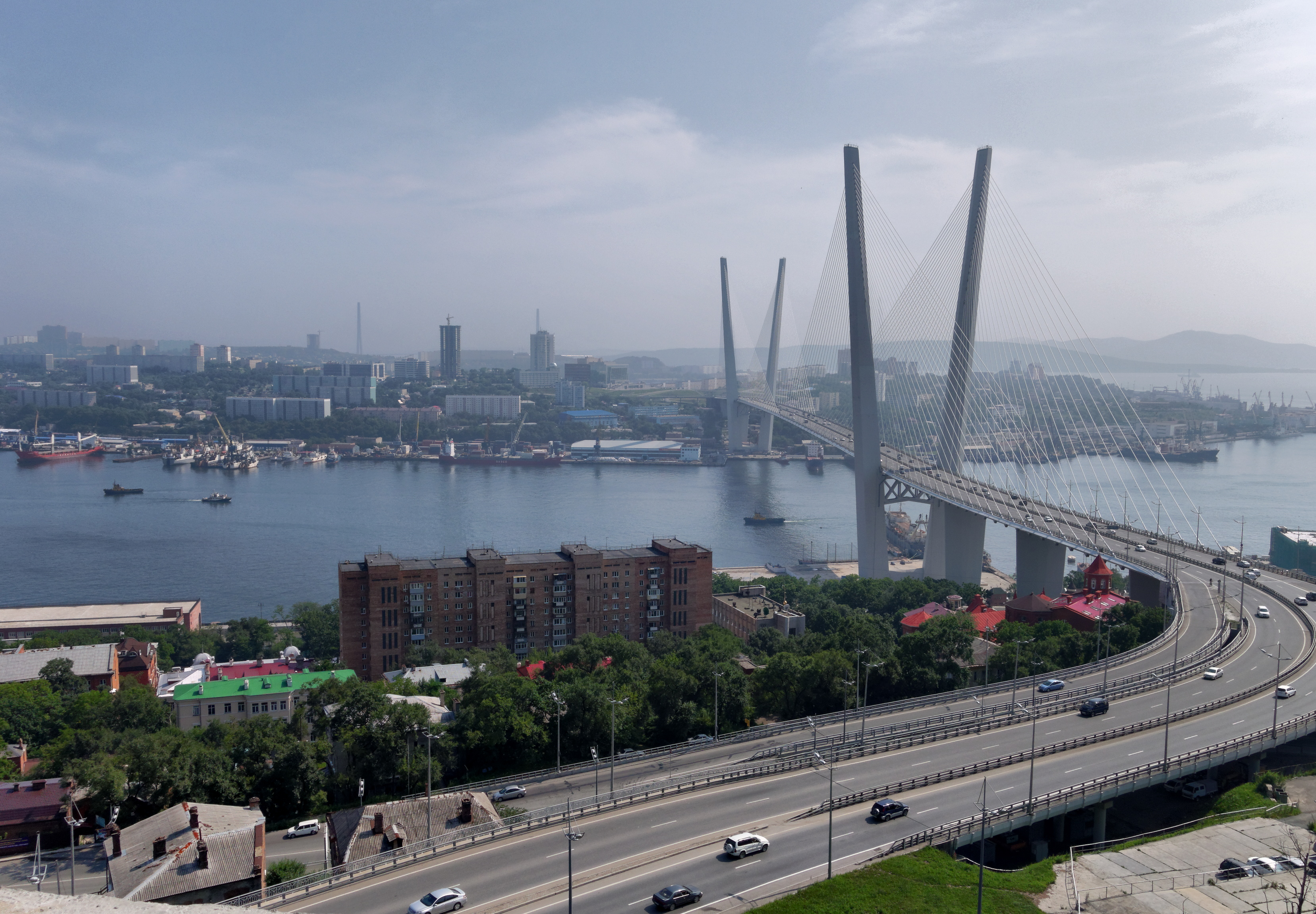
Vladivostok in 2015

- Khabarovsk
- Vladivostok
- Ulan-Ude
- Chita
- Komsomolsk-on-Amur
- Blagoveshchensk
- Yakutsk
- Petropavlovsk-Kamchatsky
- Yuzhno-Sakhalinsk
- Nakhodka
- Ussuriysk

=== Traditional ethnic groups ===
The original population groups of the Russian Far East include (grouped by language group):

- Mongolic: Buryats
- Turkic: Sakha
- Eskimo–Aleut: Aleuts, Siberian Yupiks (Yuits)
- Chukotko-Kamchatkan: Chukchi, Koryaks, Alutors, Kereks, Itelmens
- Tungusic: Evenks, Evens, Nanais, Orochs, Ul'ch, Udegey, Orok, Manchus
- Isolate: Yukaghirs, Nivkhs, Ainus

== Transportation ==
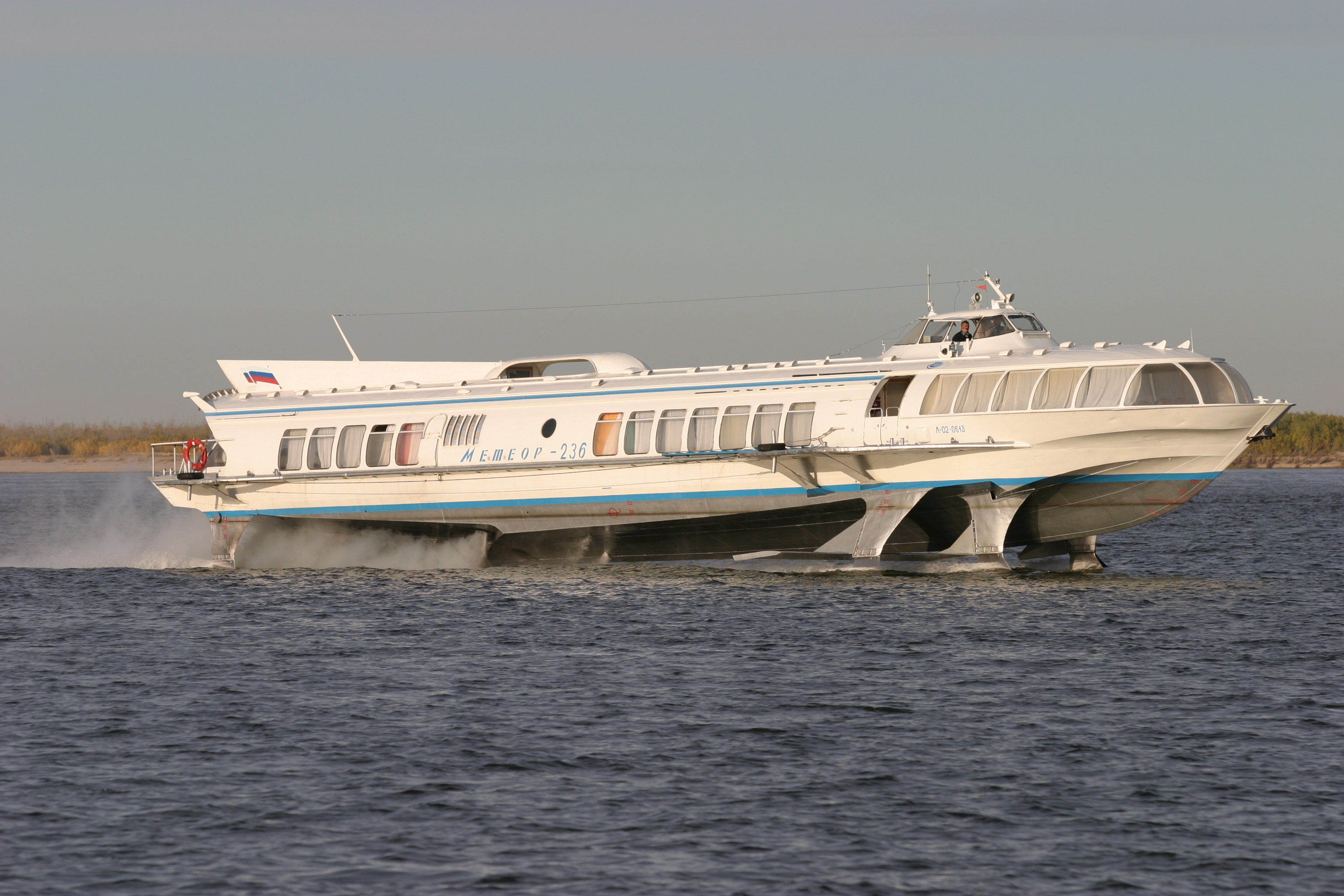
Transportation on the Lena River (2004)

The region was not connected with the rest of Russia via domestic highways until the R297 highway (formerly M58) was completed in 2010.

Uniquely for Russia, most cars have right-hand drive (73% of cars in the region), though they are still driven on the right-hand side of the road.

Railways are better developed. The Trans-Siberian Railway and Baikal–Amur Mainline (since 1984) provide a connection with Siberia (and the rest of the country). The Amur–Yakutsk Mainline is aimed to link the city of Yakutsk to the Russian railway network. Regular passenger trains have connected to Nizhny Bestyakh since 2019.

As in nearby Siberia, for many remote localities, aviation is the main mode of transportation to/from civilisation, but the infrastructure is often lacking due to the harsh climate associated with the region. In 2018, Russia announced a $235 million plan designed to upgrade existing airports within the Far East. Khabarovsk Novy Airport is one of the largest airports serving the Far East, connecting much of mainland Russia to the area, as well as certain regions of East Asia.

Maritime transport is important for delivering supplies to localities near the Pacific and Arctic coasts, and for shipping exports, especially oil, gas and ores.

== Fauna ==
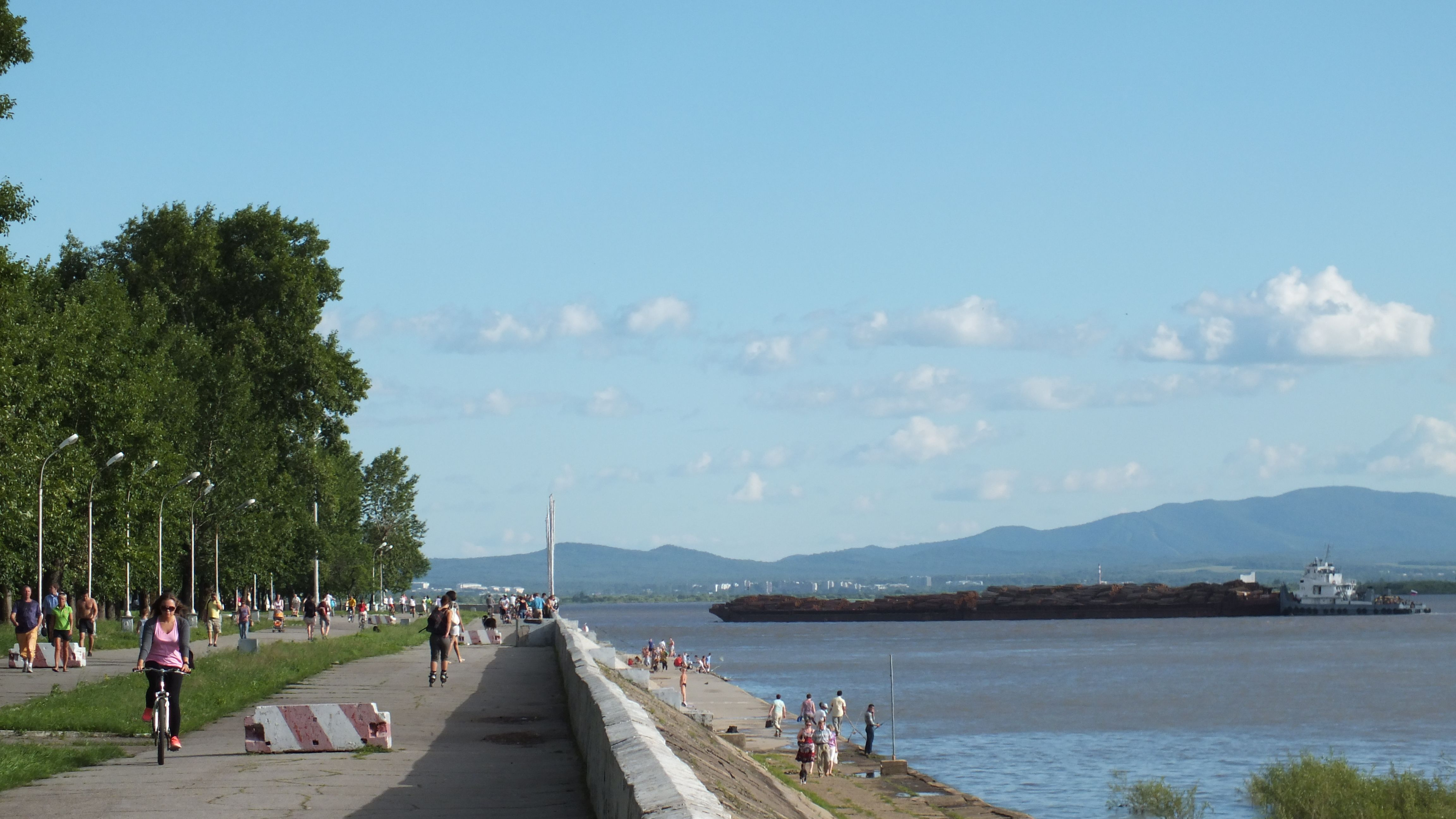
On the Amur in Khabarovsk

=== Order Galliformes ===
==== Family Tetraonidae ====
- Hazel grouse
- Siberian grouse
- Black grouse
- Black-billed capercaillie
- Willow ptarmigan
- Rock ptarmigan

==== Family Phasianidae ====
- Daurian partridge
- Japanese quail
- Ring-necked pheasant

=== Order Artiodactyla ===
- Sika deer
- Snow sheep
- Caribou
- Moose
- Wild boar
- Siberian roe deer
- Manchurian wapiti
- Siberian musk deer

=== Order Carnivora ===
==== Family Canidae ====
- Eurasian wolf
- Tundra wolf
- Arctic fox
- Red fox

==== Family Felidae ====
- Amur leopard
- Siberian tiger
- Eurasian lynx

==== Family Ursidae ====
- Ussuri black bear
- Eurasian brown bear
- East Siberian brown bear
- Kamchatka brown bear
- Ussuri brown bear
- Polar bear
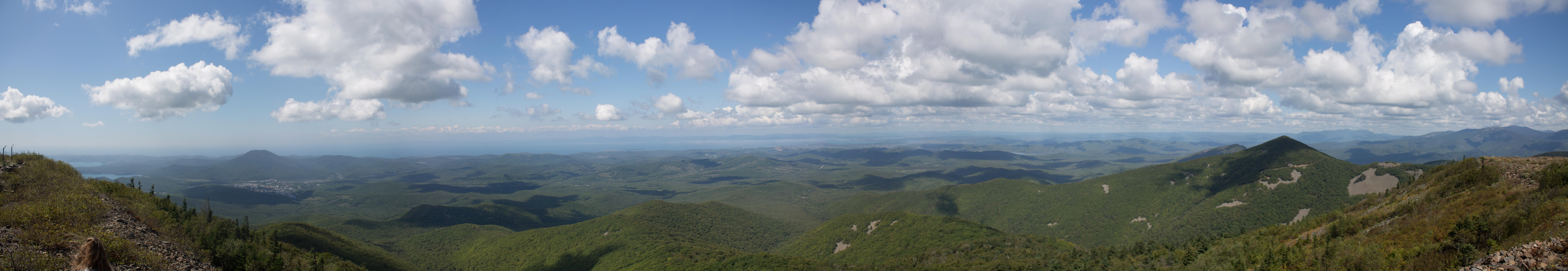
Sikhote-Alin is home to Amur tigers

== Flora ==
- Picea obovata
- Pinus pumila
- Alnus japonica

== See also ==
- Eastern Siberia
- Far North (Russia)
- Kolyma
- List of Russian explorers
- Far Eastern Republic
- Primorskaya Oblast
- Khabarovsk Campaign

== Bibliography ==
- Beer, Daniel. The house of the dead: Siberian exile under the tsars (Vintage, 2017).
- Bobrick, Benson. East of the Sun: the Epic Conquest and Tragic History of Siberia, (NY: Poseidon Press, 1992)
- Forsyth, James. History of the Peoples of Siberia, (Cambridge: University Press 1992)
- Glebov, Sergei. "Center, Periphery, and Diversity in the Late Imperial Far East: New Historiography of a Russian Region." Ab Imperio 2019.3 (2019): 265–278.
- Hartley, Janet M. Siberia, A History of the People, (New Haven: Yale University Press 2014)
- Haywood, A.J. Siberia: A Cultural History, (Oxford UP, 2010)
- Monahan, Erika. The merchants of Siberia: Trade in early modern Eurasia (Cornell UP, 2016).
- Naumov, Igor. History of Siberia, (London: Routledge, 2006)
- Reid, Anna. The Shaman's Coat: A Native History of Siberia, (NY: Walker & Comp., 2002)
- Stolberg, Eva-Maria (ed.), Siberian Saga: a History of Russia's Wild East, (2005)
- Vajda (ed.), Edward J. Languages and Prehistory of Central Siberia, (Philadelphia: John Benjamins, 2004)
- Wood, Alan. The History of Siberia, (London: Rutledge, 1991)
- Wood, Alan. Russian Far East 1581–1991, (London: Bloomsbury Academic, 2011)
