= Primorskaya Oblast =

Former Russian administrative division

Coordinates: 43.1167°N 131.9000°E

Primorskaya Oblast Примо́рская о́бласть Primorskaya oblast'
- Oblast of Russia and Far Eastern Republic
- 1856–1922
- Coat of arms

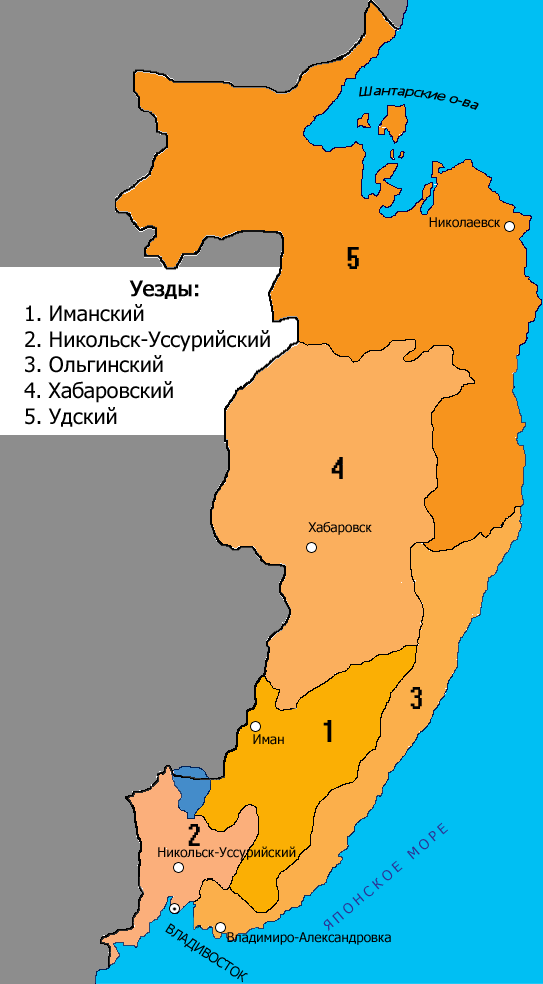
- Capital: Nikolayevsk-on-Amur (1856–1880); Khabarovka (1880–1888); Vladivostok (1888–1922)
- History
  - Established: 31 October 1856
  - Transformed into Primorskaya Governorate: 1922
Preceded by	Succeeded by
Manchuria	Primorskaya Governorate; Kamchatka Oblast
- Today part of: Russia

Primorskaya Oblast (Russian: Примо́рская о́бласть) was an administrative division of the Russian Empire and the early Russian SFSR, created on October 31, 1856 by the Governing Senate. The name of the region literally means "Maritime" or "Coastal." The region was established upon a Russian conquest of Daur people that used to live along Amur River. Before the Russian conquest of Outer Manchuria, the territory belonged to the Chinese region of Manchuria.

== History ==
The Amur region was raided by the 1651 Russian expedition of Yerofey Khabarov, after which the indigenous Daur people were either killed or fled further into territory of Qing China. After the Russian conquest, the territory became known as Outer Manchuria, or Russian Manchuria. The precursor of Primorskaya Oblast was the Albazino Voivodeship that existed 1882-86 and was abolished upon the conclusion of the Sino-Russian border conflicts. At first it was part of the Eastern Siberian General Government, but beginning 1884 within the Cis-Amur General Government.

Originally the oblast included the entire northeastern portion of Russia and territories of the Cis-Amur region. It was organized out of the newly acquired territories of the valley of the River Amur, Kamchatka Oblast, and Sakhalin. In 1858 the territory bordering along the left-bank of the Amur River to the outlet of the Ussuri River was transferred to the newly established Amur Oblast.

At that time the region only included four districts: Nikolayevsk, Sofiysk, Okhotsk, Kamchatka. According to the Peking Treaty, in 1860 the Ussuri Krai was annexed to the region, based on the Treaty of Aigun and the Convention of Peking. During 1880-1888 there was created a separate Vladivostok Military Governorate that included Muravyov-Amursky Peninsula and the port of Vladivostok. In 1884 Sakhalin was separated as a separate administrative territory.

The capital of the oblast was originally Nikolayevsk-on-Amur, during 1880-1888 – Khabarovka (presently named Khabarovsk), and during 1888 it was relocated to Vladivostok.

In 1920, Primorskaya Oblast was included in the Far Eastern Republic and in 1922 transformed into the Primorskaya Governorate.

From 1932-39, there existed a region with the same name that was part of the Far Eastern Krai of the Russian SFSR.

== Gallery ==
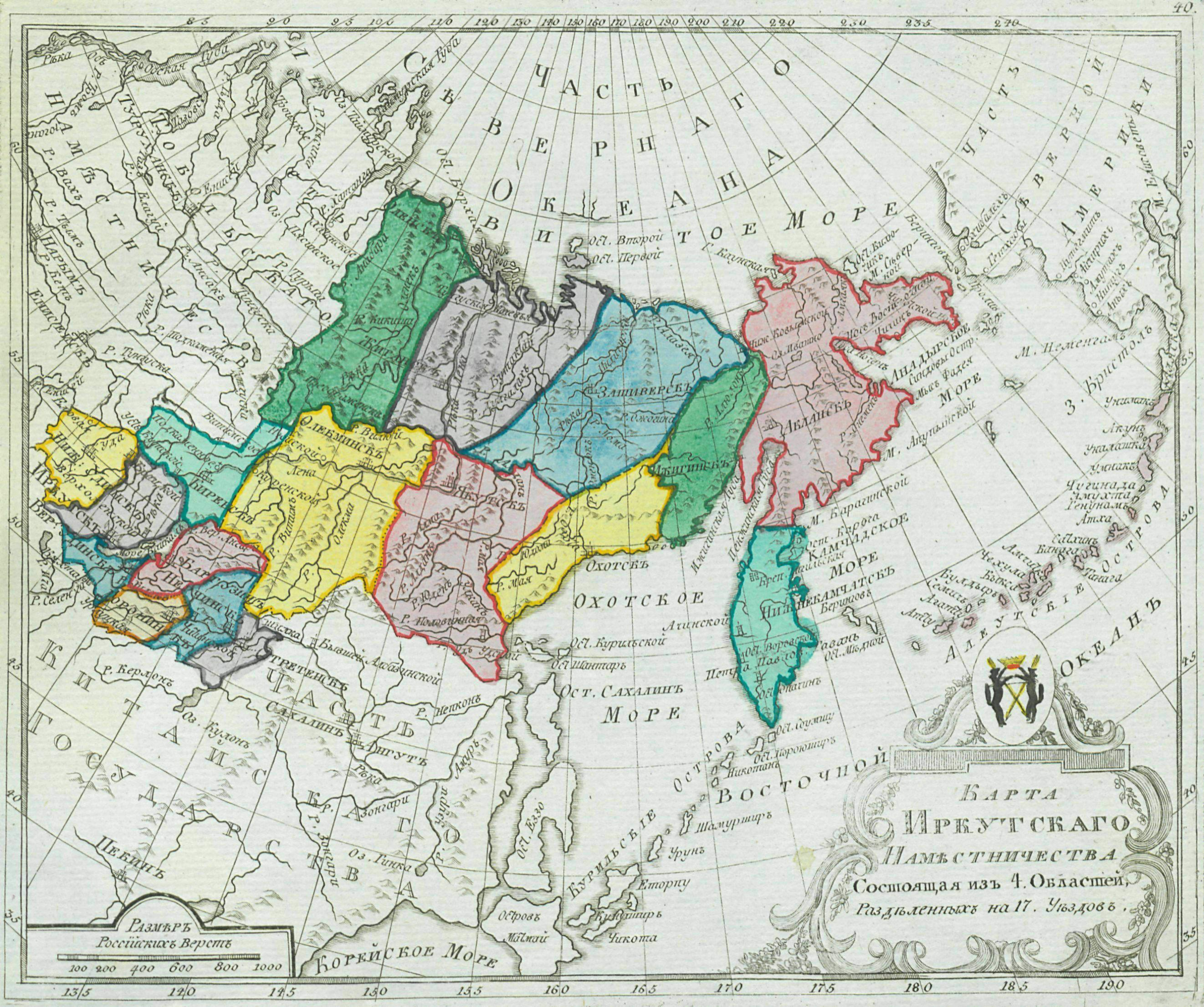
Irkutsk Vice-royalty in 1792.

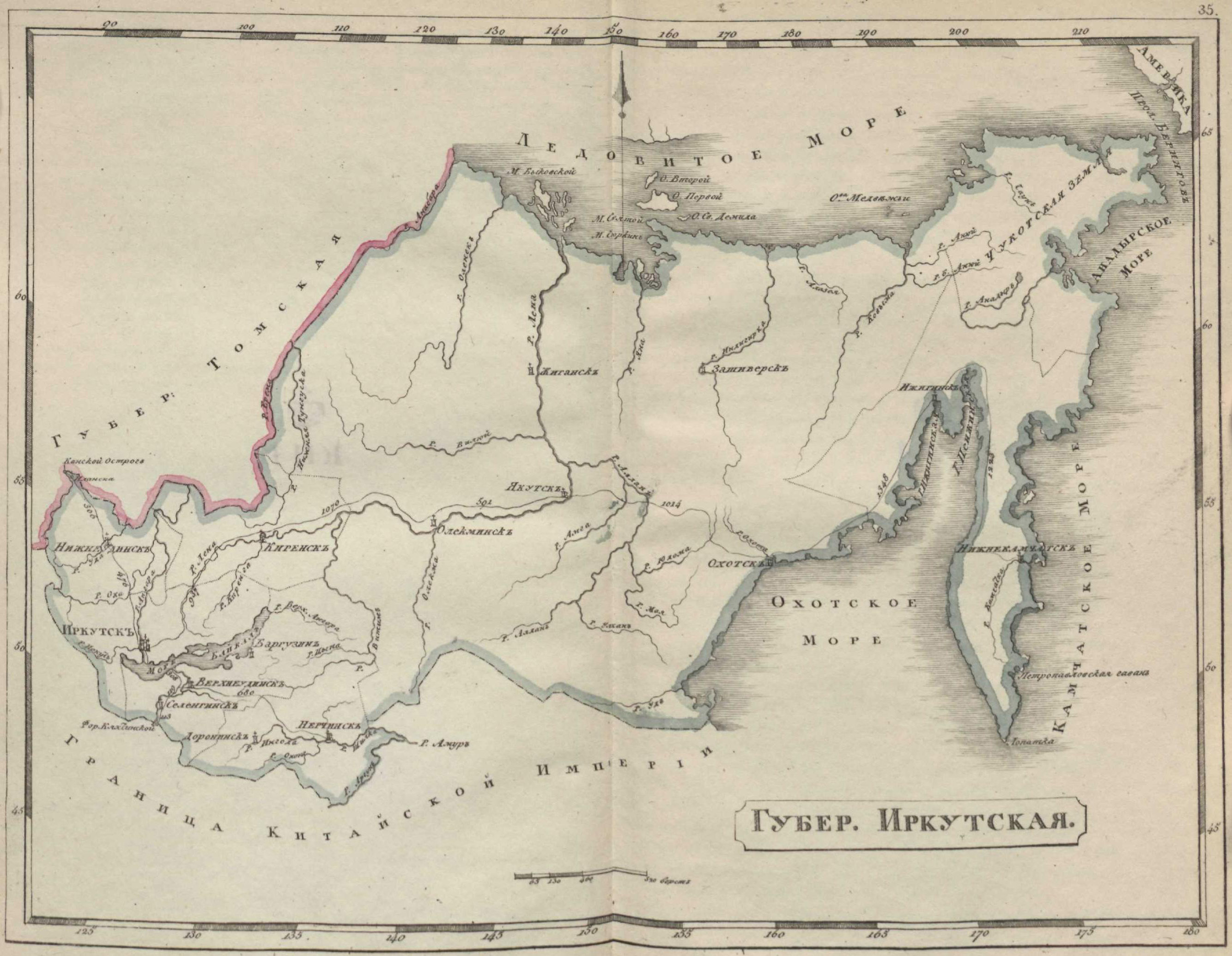
Irkutsk Governorate (Eastern Siberia) in 1808.

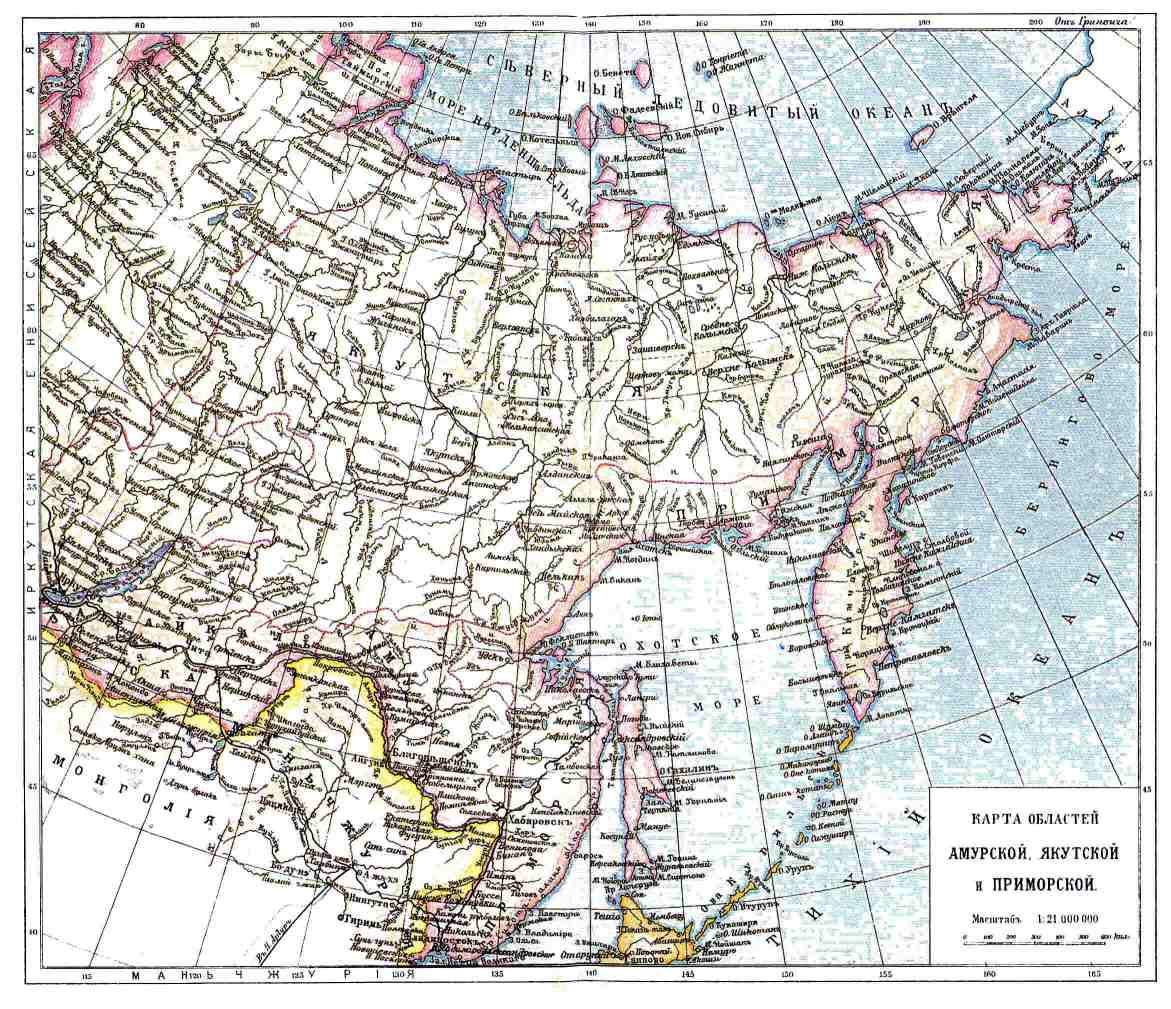
Eastern Siberia.

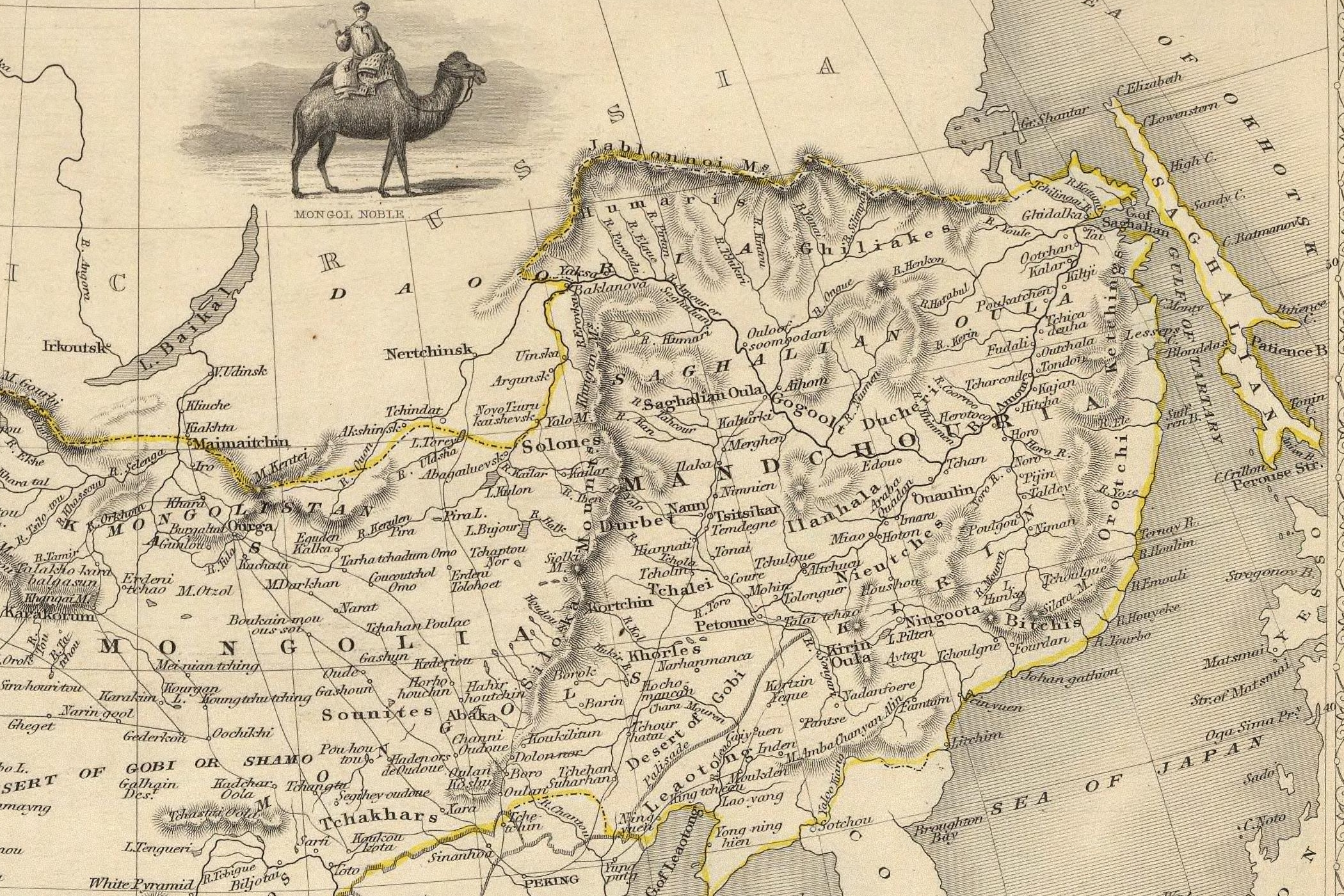
1851 map of Amur River region.

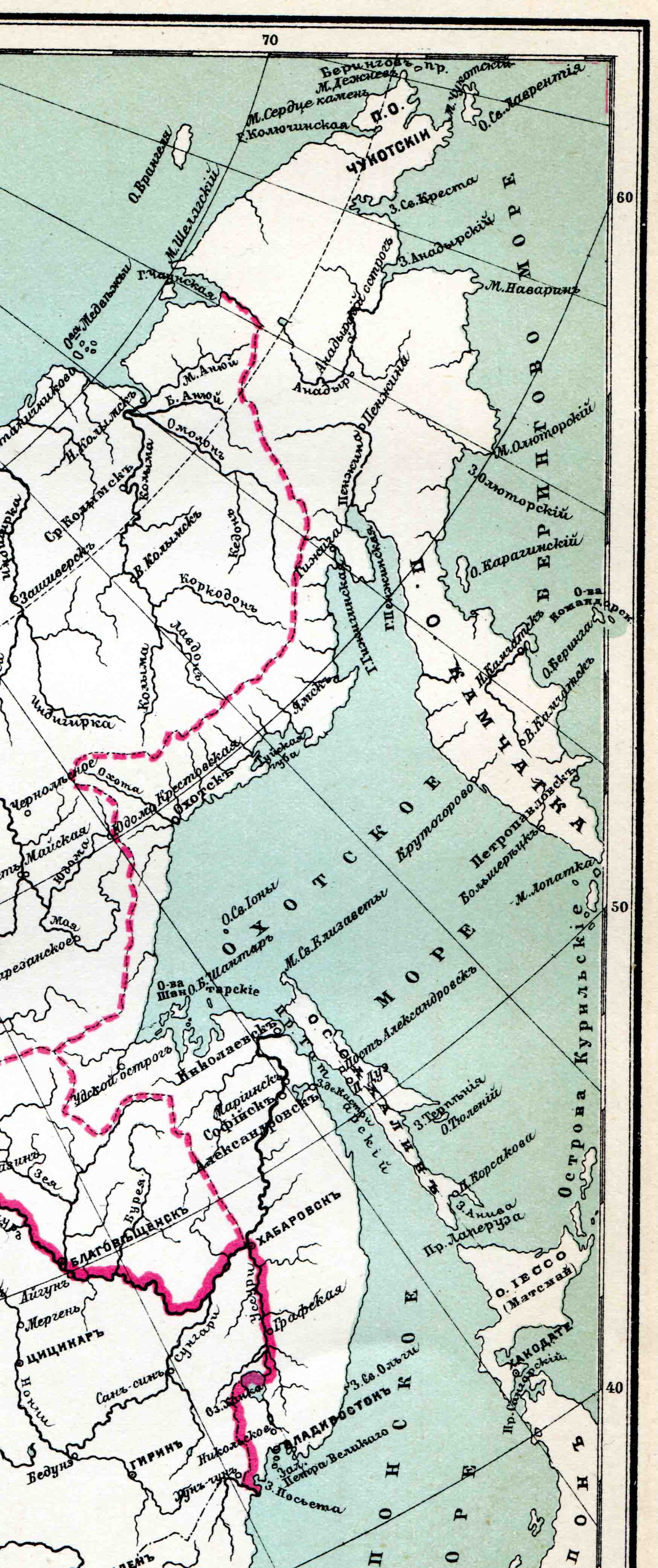
Map of Primorskaya Oblast in 1899

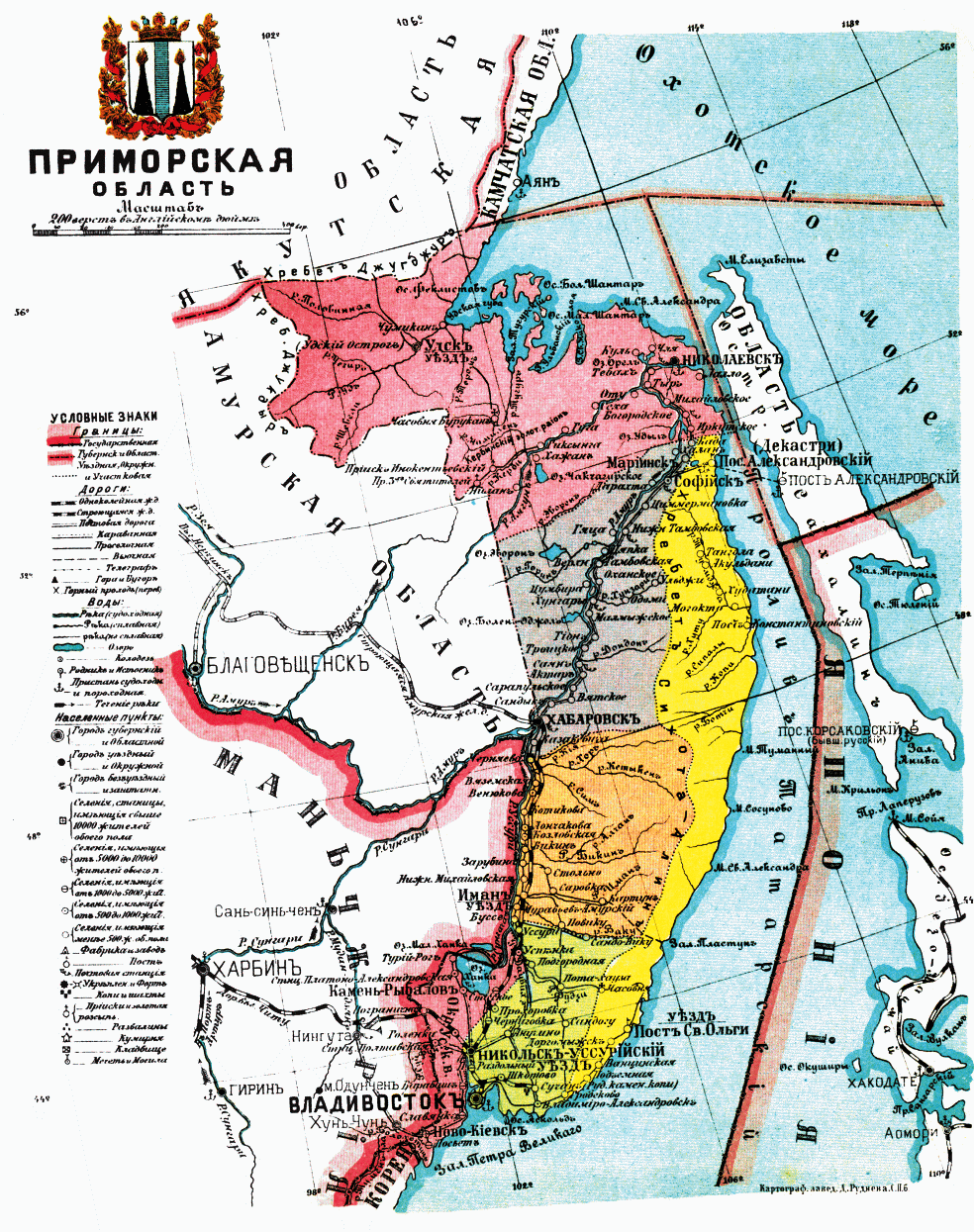
Map of Primorskaya Oblast in 1913

== Administrative divisions ==
In 1907

№	Region	Capital city			Area viorst²	Population
№	Region	Name	1897	1914	Area viorst²	Population
1	Khabarovsk uezd	Khabarovsk	14 971	53 127	221 506,6	75 500
2	Iman uezd	Iman	--	7 452	52 000,0	83 300
3	Nikolsk-Ussuriyski uezd	Nikolsk-Ussuriyskoye	10 868	46 667	67 847,0	179 000
4	Olginsky uezd	Vladimiro-Aleksandorvskoye	576	952	48 000,0	39 200
5	Udskiy uezd	Nikolaevsk	5 684	15 443	129 207,0	30 500
6	Ussuri Cossack regiment okrug	Vladivostok	28 933	65 728	87 906,0	125 600

== See also ==
- Amur Annexation
- 1855 Treaty of Shimoda, Japan-Russia delimitation treaty on Sakhalin and Kurile islands
