= List of shipwrecks in August 1867 =

The list of shipwrecks in August 1867 includes ships sunk, foundered, grounded, or otherwise lost during August 1867.

== 1 August ==
List of shipwrecks: 1 August 1867
Ship	State	Description
Defiance	United Kingdom	The steamship ran aground in the River Parrett. She was on a voyage from Bridgwater, Somerset to Ilfracombe, Devon. She was refloated with assistance from a tug.
Dyson	United Kingdom	The ship was wrecked at Arkhangelsk, Russia.
Edward and Christopher	(United Kingdom of Great Britain and Ireland) New Zealand	The schooner was wrecked at Stony Bay, close to the entrance to Akaroa Harbour, during a heavy gale.
Friedrich	United Kingdom	The ship was driven ashore at Arkhangelsk. She was refloated and taken into Arkhangelsk for repairs.
Heinrich	Flag unknown	The galiot was driven ashore at "Havannah". She was on a voyage from Saint Petersburg, Russia to London, United Kingdom.
I. O. U.	United Kingdom	The ship was destroyed by fire at Havana, Cuba.
Mary Ann Christina	(United Kingdom of Great Britain and Ireland) New Zealand	The schooner was wrecked on Ninety Mile Beach during a strong gale. She was driven ashore in order to save the crew, some 3 km south of the wreck of the Vixen (see below).
Ocean Bride	United Kingdom	The dandy was wrecked on the Denouilles Rocks, Jersey, Channel Islands. Her crew were rescued. she was on a voyage from Hartlepool, County Durham to Saint-Malo, Ille-et-Vilaine, France.
Star of Canada	United Kingdom	The ship was driven ashore and sank in the Saint Lawrence River. She was on a voyage from Liverpool, Lancashire to Montreal, Quebec, Canada. Although condemned, she was refloated in September and towed to Quebec City in a hogged and twisted condition. She arrived on 20 September.
Vixen	(United Kingdom of Great Britain and Ireland) New Zealand	The schooner (also reported as a ketch) was wrecked on Ninety Mile Beach during a strong gale. The ship capsized, and all but one of her crew drowned.

== 2 August ==
List of shipwrecks: 2 August 1867
Ship	State	Description
Antoinetta	United Kingdom	The ship was wrecked at the mouth of the Rio Grande. She was on a voyage from Montevideo, Uruguay to London.
Black Diamond	United Kingdom	The brig was run into by the steamship Bombay Castle (United Kingdom) and sank off the Malacca Lighthouse, Malaya with the loss of twenty lives. About 40 survivors were rescued by Bombay Castle.
Cordelia	(United Kingdom of Great Britain and Ireland) New Zealand	The 29-ton cutter was wrecked near Baring Head near Wellington with the loss of all three on board.
Volga	Canada	The schooner was wrecked on "Burnt Coast Island". Her crew were rescued. She was on a voyage from Saint John, New Brunswick to Newhaven, Connecticut, United States.
Willie	United Kingdom	The smack ran aground on the Foilskirt Rocks, off the coast of County Wexford. Her crew were rescued. She was on a voyage from Waterford to Dublin.

== 3 August ==
List of shipwrecks: 3 August 1867
Ship	State	Description
Junius	United Kingdom	The ship was driven ashore between Ceuta, Spain and Tangier, Morocco. She was on a voyage from Odesa, Russia to Antwerp, Belgium.
Phaolo	United Kingdom	The ship sprang a leak and was abandoned in the Atlantic Ocean. Her crew were rescued by the barque Cienfuegos (United States). Phaolo was on a voyage from Matanzas, Cuba to Greenock, Renfrewshire.
Water Witch	United States	The seining schooner was lost off Matinicus Isle, Maine. Crew saved.

== 4 August ==
List of shipwrecks: 4 August 1867
Ship	State	Description
Cruickshank	United Kingdom	The ship sank near the Outer Dowsing Sand, in the North Sea.
Isabella Forbes	United Kingdom	The ship was wrecked near Stonehaven, Aberdeenshire.

== 5 August ==
List of shipwrecks: 5 August 1867
Ship	State	Description
Baltique	France	The ship was driven ashore at Dragør, Denmark. She was on a voyage from Kalix, Sweden to Livorno, Italy. She was refloated and taken into Copenhagen, Denmark.
Charles Marie	France	The ship ran aground at Sunderland, County Durham, United Kingdom. She was on a voyage from Boulogne, Pas-de-Calaisl to Sunderland.
James Cruickshank	United Kingdom	The ship was destroyed by fire off Lowestoft, Suffolk. Her crew were rescued. She was on a voyage from Carboneras, Spain to Aberdeen.
St. Bartholemy	Sweden	The ship was driven ashore at Dragør, Denmark. She was on a voyage from Gävle to Grimsby, Lincolnshire, United Kingdom. She was refloated and taken into Copenhagen, Denmark in a leaky condition.

== 6 August ==
List of shipwrecks: 6 August 1867
Ship	State	Description
Koonen	Flag unknown	The ship was wrecked at Ceuta, Spain. She was on a voyage from Odesa, Russia to Falmouth, Cornwall, United Kingdom.

== 8 August ==
List of shipwrecks: 8 August 1867
Ship	State	Description
Armenian	United Kingdom	The steamship caught fire off Singapore, Straits Settlements. She was on a voyage from Singapore to Straits Settlements. She put back to Singapore, where the fire was extinguished with assistance from HMS Rifleman, HMS Zebra (both Royal Navy) and other vessels.
Emily Gifford	United States	The ship collided with the steamship Malta (United Kingdom) and sank off Long Island, New York. Her crew were rescued by Malta. Emily Gifford was on a voyage from New York City to Boston, Massachusetts.
Johanna Maria	Netherlands	The ship departed from Batavia, Netherlands East Indies for a Dutch port. No further trace, presumed foundered with the loss of all hands.
New Simon Peter	United Kingdom	The fishing lugger collided with the sloop Brilliant ( (United Kingdom of Great Britain and Ireland) Jersey) and sank in the North Sea. Her crew were rescued by Brilliant.
Santa Marguerita Ligure	Italy	The ship was driven ashore at Ceuta, Spain. She was on a voyage from Constantinople, Ottoman Empire to Queenstown, County Cork, United Kingdom. She was refloated and towed into Gibraltar.
Sea Flower	United Kingdom	The ship struck a sunken rock in Baleachrach Bay and was holed. She was on a voyage from Runcorn, Cheshire to Aberdeen. She put into Portaskaig, Islay.

== 9 August ==
List of shipwrecks: 9 August 1867
Ship	State	Description
Gleaner	United Kingdom	The schooner was run down and sunk 3 nautical miles (5.6 km) off Robin Hoods Bay, Yorkshire by Henry (United Kingdom). Her crew were rescued by Henry. Gleaner was on a voyage from Hartlepool, County Durham to Southwold, Suffolk.
Merchant Prince	United Kingdom	The ship was wrecked on Chowl's Cedar Reef. Her crew were rescued. She was on a voyage from the Clyde to Bombay, India.
Nuestra Señora Del Carmen	Spain	The ship capsized in the Mediterranean Sea off "Ragged Staff".

== 10 August ==
List of shipwrecks: 10 August 1867
Ship	State	Description
Annette	France	The schooner collided with the steamship Tarifa (Spain) and sank with the loss of a crew member. Survivors were rescued by Tarifa.
Farmers	United Kingdom	The ship was abandoned off Holborn Head, Caithness. Her crew survived.
Husopulo	Greece	The brig was wrecked on the Conig Shallows. She was on a voyage from "Scopello" to Constantinople, Ottoman Empire.
Victoria	United Kingdom	The tug was severely damaged by a boiler explosion in the River Tyne.

== 11 August ==
List of shipwrecks: 11 August 1867
Ship	State	Description
Arkadion	Greece	Cretan revolt: The paddle steamer was shelled and rammed by İzzedin (Ottoman Navy) off Cape Krios, Crete. She was consequently beached with the loss of three lives and set afire. Arkadion was subsequently shelled by Ertuğrul and Mahmudiye (both Ottoman Navy). The Ottomans extinguished the fire the next day. She was refloated and towed to Constantinople, Ottoman Empire, where she arrived on 21 September. Arkadion was repaired and taken into Ottoman Navy service.
Czar	United Kingdom	The ship was abandoned in the Atlantic Ocean (54°25′N 26°12′W). Her crew were rescued by the steamship Arago (United States). Czar was on a voyage from South Shields, County Durham to Quebec City, Canada.
Nautilus	(United Kingdom of Great Britain and Ireland) New Zealand	The 29-ton schooner was wrecked on Whale Island in the Bay of Plenty. She was en route to Auckland and took shelter in the lea of the island during a gale, but dragged both anchors and ran on shore.
Stella	United States	The barque was wrecked on Trety Island in Penzhina Bay in Shelikhov Gulf in the northeastern Sea of Okhotsk. Two men were lost as the barque was smashed on the rocks. The rest of the crew were rescued by nearby vessels.

== 12 August ==
List of shipwrecks: 12 August 1867
Ship	State	Description
Arrow	United Kingdom	The ship was wrecked off "Viuvielgrund".
Dragon Fly	United Kingdom	The overloaded steamboat started taking on water and was beached in Lake Windermere. Some of the 400-plus passengers were taken off by another steamboat and she floated.
James and Mary	United Kingdom	The ship struck the Willow Rock, off the coast of Cornwall and sank at Saint Michael's Mount. She was on a voyage from Swansea, Glamorgan to Plymouth, Devon. She was refloated and resumed her voyage following temporary repairs.
Krompenerwaard	Netherlands	The ship was wrecked at Port Elizabeth, Cape Colony.
Susannah Temple	United Kingdom	The brig was wrecked near Matanzas, Cuba.

== 13 August ==
List of shipwrecks: 13 August 1867
Ship	State	Description
Fortuna	Hamburg	The ship foundered in the North Sea. Her crew were rescued by Herzog Bogislaw ( Grand Duchy of Mecklenburg-Schwerin). Fortuna was on a voyage from Hamburg to Perth, United Kingdom.

== 14 August ==
List of shipwrecks: 14 August 1867
Ship	State	Description
Anastasia	Trieste	The brig was wrecked at Cape Spartel, Morocco. She was on a voyage from Liverpool, Lancashire, United Kingdom to Trieste.
Edward Moore	(United Kingdom of Great Britain and Ireland) New Zealand	The 16-ton schooner was driven ashore and wrecked 8 km south of the mouth of the Manawatu River.
Geneva	United Kingdom	The schooner struck The Platters, off the coast of Anglesey and sank. Her crew were rescued. She was on a voyage from Runcorn, Cheshire to "Llanellhaiarn" or "Llanarthison". Geneva was refloated on 23 August and taken into Holyhead, Anglesey.
Mariner	United Kingdom	The ship caught fire in the English Channel off the coast of Dorset. She was on a voyage from Quebec City, Canada to Portsmouth, Hampshire. She put into Poole, Dorset in a leaky condition. Extra crew were taken aboard to work the pumps and she completed her voyage the next day.
Zone	United Kingdom	The ship foundered 180 nautical miles (330 km) east of Cape St. Mary's, Falkland Islands. She was on a voayeg from Glasgow, Renfrewshire to Lambayeque, Peru.

== 15 August ==
List of shipwrecks: 15 August 1867
Ship	State	Description
Lake St. Peter	Canada	The steamship was run into by the steamship Secred ( (Canada) ) and sank in the Saint Lawrence River.

== 16 August ==
List of shipwrecks: 16 August 1867
Ship	State	Description
Prince Arthur	United Kingdom	The tug collided with the steamship Helvetia (United Kingdom) and sank off Holyhead, Anglesey. Her crew were rescued by Helvetia.

== 17 August ==
List of shipwrecks: 17 August 1867
Ship	State	Description
Alliance	United Kingdom	The brig foundered in the North Sea 10 nautical miles (19 km) north of the Spurn Lightship ( Trinity House). Her crew were rescued by the steamship Iona (United Kingdom). Alliance was on a voyage from Sunderland, County Durham to Saint-Valery-sur-Somme, Somme, France.
Robert Hudson	United Kingdom	The smack ran aground on the Dogger Bank, in the Irish Sea off the coast of County Wexford. Her crew were rescued by the Wexford Lifeboat.
Trajan	United States	Carrying a cargo of lime in barrels, the 125-foot (38 m) bark burned in the harbor at Newport, Rhode Island, after the lime became wet, reacted with the water, and caught fire. To extinguish the blaze, she was scuttled in 30 feet (9.1 m) of water in Narragansett Bay off Goat Island. There were no deaths in the fire or sinking.

== 18 August ==
List of shipwrecks: 18 August 1867
Ship	State	Description
Enterprise	United Kingdom	The tug sank at Liverpool, Lancashire.
Harry	United Kingdom	The ship sank at New Calabar, Africa. She was on a voyage from Liverpool to New Calabar.
Minerva	United Kingdom	The ship was driven ashore and sank at Maltreath, Anglesey. Her crew were rescued. She was on a voyage from Swansea, Glamorgan to Belfast, County Antrim.
River Derwent	United Kingdom	The ship was wrecked on New Island, Falkland Islands. Her crew were rescued. She was on a voyage from Liverpool to Valparaíso, Chile.
Thistle	United Kingdom	The ship sank in St. Mary's Bay. She was on a voyage from Quebec City, Canada to Waterford.

== 19 August ==
List of shipwrecks: 19 August 1867
Ship	State	Description
Florence	United Kingdom	The schooner was wrecked on Seal Island, Maine, United States with the loss of a crew member. She was on a voyage from Cornwallis, Nova Scotia, Canada to Boston, Massachusetts, United States.
Happy Return	United Kingdom	The ship ran aground at Fécamp, Seine-Inférieure, France. She was on a voyage from Newcastle upon Tyne, Northumberland to Caen, Calvados, France. She was refloated on 25 September and taken into Fécamp for repairs.
Octavie	France	The ship struck a rock and sank in the Loire. Her crew were rescued.
Sarah Jane	United Kingdom	The barque was wrecked on Cape Sable Island, Nova Scotia, Canada. She was on a voyage from Saint Vincent to Quebec City, Canada.

== 20 August ==
List of shipwrecks: 20 August 1867
Ship	State	Description
Carl Johann	Sweden	The ship ran aground at Dragør, Denmark. She was on a voyage from Härnösand to Havre de Grâce, Seine-Inférieure, France.
Hirnant	United Kingdom	The schooner-rigged steamship was wrecked on the Isle of May, Fife. Her crew survived. Hirnant was on a voyage from Gourdon, Aberdeenshire to Leven, Fife.
Singapore	United Kingdom	The paddle steamer struck an uncharted rock and was wrecked at Hakodate, Japan. All 145 people on board were rescued. She was on a voyage from Yokohama to Hakodate.
Venus	United Kingdom	The cutter struck the Fourquier Rocks, in the Channel Islands and was damaged. She was on a voyage from Cardiff, Glamorgan to Saint-Malo, Ille-et-Vilaine, France. She put into Gorey, Jersey in a leaky condition.

== 21 August ==
List of shipwrecks: 21 August 1867
Ship	State	Description
Asia	United States	The ship was wrecked on Burnevelt Island, off Cape Horn, Chile. Her eighteen crew survived. They were rescued on 20 September by the barque Professor Airey (United Kingdom). Asia was on a voyage from South Shields, County Durham, United Kingdom to San Francisco, California.
Margaret	United Kingdom	The ship was lost at St. Shott.s, Newfoundland. She was on a voyage from Halifax, Nova Scotia, Canada to Málaga, Spain.

== 22 August ==
List of shipwrecks: 22 August 1867
Ship	State	Description
Alma	United Kingdom	The ship departed from Donegal for Quebec City, Canada. No further trace presumed foundered with the loss of all hands.

== 23 August ==
List of shipwrecks: 23 August 1867
Ship	State	Description
Blackwall	United Kingdom	The ship was damaged by fire at San Francisco, California, United States. She was repaired.
Lady Darling	(United Kingdom of Great Britain and Ireland) Victoria	The steamship caught fire in the Murray River and was scuttled. Her crew were rescued. She was on a voyage from Echuca Wharf to Wahgunyah.
One	United Kingdom	The smack collided with the schooner Mary Grace (United Kingdom) and was beached in the Menai Strait. She was on a voyage from Liverpool, Lancashire to Caernarfon.
Tenant	United Kingdom	The ship was wrecked on Islay, Inner Hebrides.

== 25 August ==
List of shipwrecks: 25 August 1867
Ship	State	Description
Christian	United Kingdom	The ship was wrecked between Cape Terebersloi and Kildin Island, Russia. Her crew were rescued. She was on a voyage from Arkhangelsk, Russia to the Clyde.
Volante	United Kingdom	The ship was destroyed by fire in the Indian Ocean. Her crew were rescued. She was on a voyage from Liverpool, Lancashire to Bombay, India.

== 26 August ==
List of shipwrecks: 26 August 1867
Ship	State	Description
Curlew	(Denmark) Danish West Indies	The schooner was wrecked at Saint Domingo. She was on a voyage from Saint Domingo to Saint Thomas, Virgin Islands.
Emerald Isle	(United Kingdom of Great Britain and Ireland) New Zealand	The 29-ton schooner foundered off the Buller coast with the loss of all on board during a storm.
Mariner	(United Kingdom of Great Britain and Ireland) New Zealand	The schooner was wrecked near Whangārei.

== 27 August ==
List of shipwrecks: 27 August 1867
Ship	State	Description
Enoch Benier	United Kingdom	The ship was sighted off the Smalls Lighthouse, Cornwall whilst on a voyage from Liverpool, Lancashire to Boston, Massachusetts. No further trace, presumed foundered with the loss of all hands.
Planter	United Kingdom	The brigantine foundered off the Crow Rock, off the coast of Pembrokeshire. Her crew were rescued. She was on a voyage from Newport, Monmouthshire to Kinsale, County Cork.

== 28 August ==
List of shipwrecks: 28 August 1867
Ship	State	Description
Schyrid	United Kingdom	The brigantine collided with Adelaide Fanny (United Kingdom) and sank off The Smalls, Cornwall. Her crew were rescued by Adelaide Fanny. Schyrid was on a voyage from Runcorn, Cheshire to Dordrecht, South Holland, Netherlands.
St. Antonio	(Ottoman Empire) Syria Vilayet	The brig foundered off Lisbon, Portugal. Her twelve crew were rescued by the steamship Atlas (United Kingdom).

== 29 August ==
List of shipwrecks: 29 August 1867
Ship	State	Description
Emmy	(Russian Empire) Grand Duchy of Finland	The schooner ran aground at Dragør, Denmark. She was on a voyage from Liverpool, Lancashire, United Kingdom to Kronstadt, Russia.
John Pedder	United Kingdom	The brig ran aground on the Corton Sand, in the North Sea off Lowestoft, Suffolk and sank. She was on a voyage from Hartlepool, County Durham to London.
Marie Leocadie	United Kingdom	The barque ran aground on the Christchurch Ledge, in the English Channel off the coast of Dorset. She was on a voyage from South Shields, County Durham to Bridport, Dorset. She was refloated and resumed her voyage.
Wey	United Kingdom	The barque collided with another vessel and was beached at Gibraltar. She was on a voyage from Berdyanski, Russia to Queenstown, County Cork. She was refloated.

== 30 August ==
List of shipwrecks: 30 August 1867
Ship	State	Description
Augusta	United Kingdom	The schooner ran aground on The Shingles, off the Isle of Wight. She was on a voyage from London to Swansea, Glamorgan.
Guerrière	French Navy	The Dryade-class frigate was severely damaged in a typhoon in the South China Sea. She was on a voyage from Japan to Hong Kong.
Unnamed	Ottoman Navy	The transport ship collided with the steamship Vladimir (Russia) and sank in the Sea of Marmora with the loss of all but her captain. He was rescued by Vladimir.

== 31 August ==
List of shipwrecks: 31 August 1867
Ship	State	Description
San Autinig	Flag unknown	The ship foundered in the Atlantic Ocean off Lagos, Portugal. She was on a voyage from Constantinople, Ottoman Empire to London, United Kingdom.

== Unknown date ==
List of shipwrecks: Unknown date in August 1867
Ship	State	Description
Admiral Lyons	United Kingdom	The ship was driven ashore in Clanyard Bay. She was on a voyage from Liverpool, Lancashire to Quebec City, Canada. She was refloated and put into Greenock, Renfrewshire in a leaky condition.
Amelia	(flag) France	The ship was driven ashore at Gibraltar. She was on a voyage from Marseille, Bouches-du-Rhône to Sierra Leone.
Anastasia	United Kingdom	The ship was wrecked at Cape Spartel, Morocco before 15 August. Her crew were rescued. She was on a voyage from Liverpool, Lancashire to Trieste.
Annie Wilson	United Kingdom	The barque foundered off Cape Horn, Chile before 3 August. Her crew were rescued. She was on a voyage from Callao, Peru to Queenstown, County Cork.
Bruto	Italy	The brig caught fire in the Gulf of Lyon and was beached near Antibes, Alpes-Maritimes, France before 26 August. She was on a voyage from Leith, Lothian, United Kingdom to Genoa. She was subsequently towed into Genoa.
Currency	United Kingdom	The ship was driven ashore near Bombay, India. She was on a voyage from Liverpool to Bombay.
Elizabeth	United Kingdom	The ship was wrecked at Swatow, China with the loss of eight lives.
Exertion	United Kingdom	The ship sank in the North Sea. She was on a voyage from Dordrecht, South Holland, Netherlands to Findhorn, Moray.
Fleetwing	United Kingdom	The ship was driven ashore at "Matan". She had been refloated by 4 August and taken into Quebec City. She was consequently condemned.
Frank Herbert	United States	The fishing schooner was lost on Georges Bank. Lost with all 8 hands.
Heinrich George	Flag unknown	The ship ran aground on the English Bank, in the River Plate and was abandoned.
Innocencia	Spain	The ship was wrecked on the Castello Reef with the loss of all on board. She was on a voyage from Tarragona to Montevideo, Uruguay.
Ironsides	United Kingdom	The ship was driven ashore on Green Island, Canada. She had been refloated and taken into Quebec City by 5 August.
Jennie Tyler	United States	The schooner was lost on her passage from Para to New York. Lost with all 8 hands.
Mary Durkee	United Kingdom	The ship was driven ashore in the Saint Lawrence River before 3 August. She was on a voyage from Three Rivers, Quebec, Canada to Penarth, Glamorgan. She subsequently floated off and drove out to sea.
Miguel de Cervantes	Spain	The ship was wrecked on the Anegonda Reef. She was on a voyage from Cádiz to San Juan, Puerto Rico.
Nestorian	United Kingdom	The steamship was driven ashore at "Matan". She was on a voyage from Liverpool to Quebec City. She had been refloated by 4 August and taken into Quebec City.
Newsky	United Kingdom	The steamship was driven ashore on Öland, Sweden before 7 August. She was on a voyage from London to Stockholm, Sweden. She was later refloated.
Novanside	United Kingdom	The ship ran aground in the Hooghly River. She was refloated.
Pro Tem	United Kingdom	The ship was driven ashore at Point Levi, Quebec. She was refloated and resumed her voyage.
Raphael	United Kingdom	The ship departed from Nagasaki, Japan for Shanghai, China. No further trace, presumed foundered with the loss of all hands.
San Pietro	Italy	The barque was driven ashore and wrecked at Riva, Ottoman Empire before 17 August. She was on a voyage from Odesa, Russia to a British port.
S. L. Tilley	United States	The ship was abandoned in the Atlantic Ocean. She was on a voyage from Savannah, Georgia to Liverpool.
St. David	United Kingdom	The steamship was driven ashore at Matane, Quebec. She was refloated and resumed her voyage.
Sunny Side	United States	The fishing schooner sank on the Georges Bank. All 9 crewmen killed.
Tantje Trinend	Flag unknown	The ship foundered. She was on a voyage from Saint Petersburg, Russia to Leith.
Venice	United Kingdom	The steamship departed from Cardiff, Glamorgan for Trieste. No further trace, presumed foundered with the loss of all hands.
Wave	United Kingdom	The brigantine ran aground on the Shipwash Sand, in the North Sea off the coast of Suffolk and sank. Her crew were rescued.
Weile	Denmark	The ship foundered in the North Sea. She was on a voyage from Hartlepool, County Durham, United Kingdom to a Danish port.
William Melhuish	United Kingdom	The ship ran aground in the Hooghly River. She was refloated.
