= Konus Island =

Konus Конус
- Island
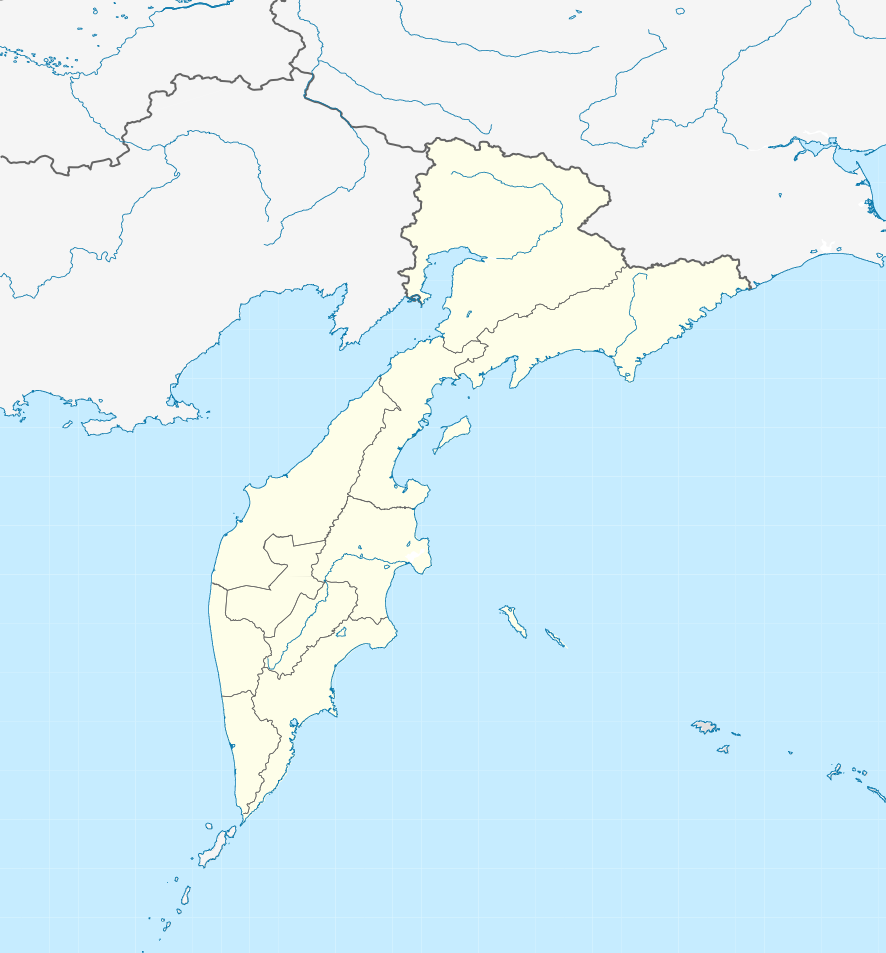
- Location within Kamchatka Krai
- Coordinates: 60°32′40″N 162°9′15″E
- Country: Russian Federation
- Federal subject: Far Eastern Federal District
- Krai: Kamchatka Krai
- Elevation: 258 m (846 ft)

Konus Island is an island in Shelikhov Bay, Sea of Okhotsk.

== Geography ==
Konus Island is 1.3 km long and 0.7 km wide. It is located off the eastern coast of Penzhina Bay, separated from the continental shore by a 3 km-wide sound. Administratively, it belongs to the Kamchatka Krai. Ivyinichaman Island (Ивиньичаман) is located 7 km to the southwest.

== History ==
American whaleships cruised for bowhead whales off the island from 1860 to 1889. They called it Shag Rock. Ships also anchored off the island to get coal and to trade with the natives for deer, fish, and berries.
