= Cape Opasnyy =

- Headland
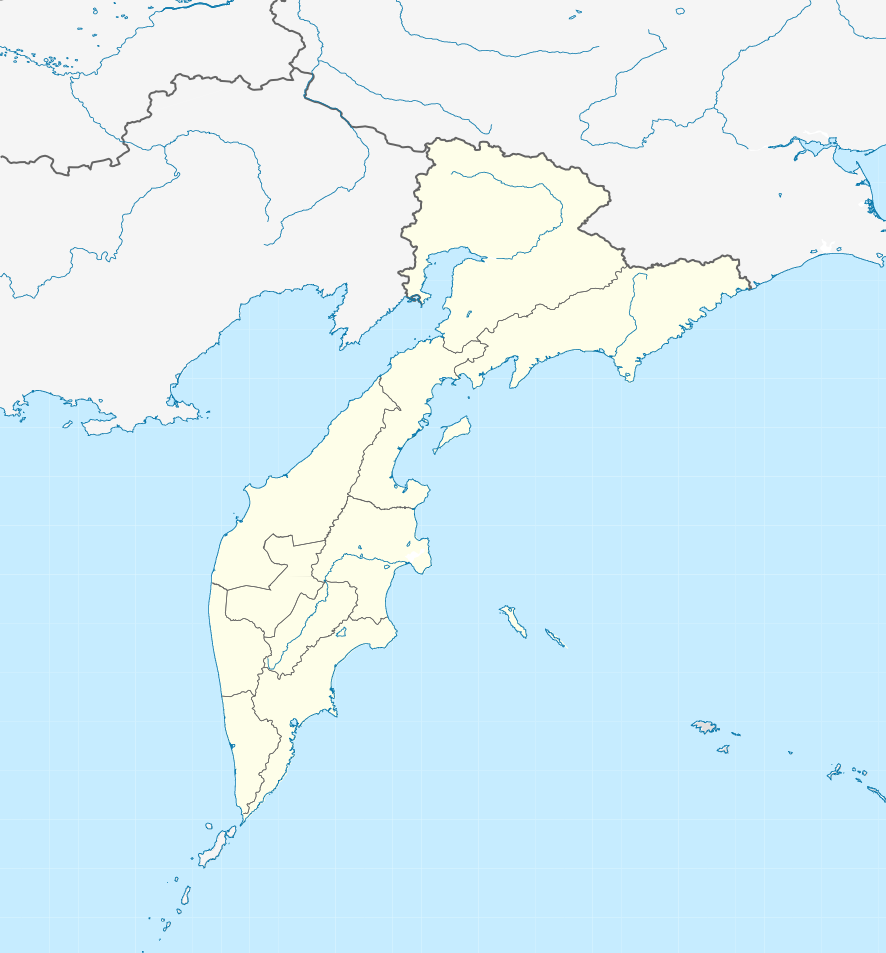
- Location within Kamchatka Krai
- Coordinates: 61°42′N 163°20′E
- Country: Russian Federation
- Federal subject: Kamchatka Krai

Cape Opasnyy (Russian: Мыс Опасный, Mys Opasnyy) is a very prominent headland in Penzhina Bay, the right arm of Shelikhov Gulf, in the northeastern Sea of Okhotsk. It lies to the northwest of The Gorlo. A ledge projects about three quarters of a mile east-northeast of the headland, while a group of detached rocks lies about 1.2 miles north northeast of it.

Administratively Cape Opasnyy belongs to the Kamchatka Krai of the Russian Federation.

== History ==
American whaleships hunting bowhead whales frequented the waters off the cape from 1866 to 1889. They called it Othello Cape, and the ledge to its east-northeast Othello Reef, both after a ship that visited the area in the early 1860s. They anchored under the cape and reef to seek shelter from southwesterly gales. Boats went ashore after salmon and wood, and also to trade with the natives from the nearby Koryak village of Big Itkana.
