= Ivyinichaman =

Ivyinichaman Ивиньичаман
- Island
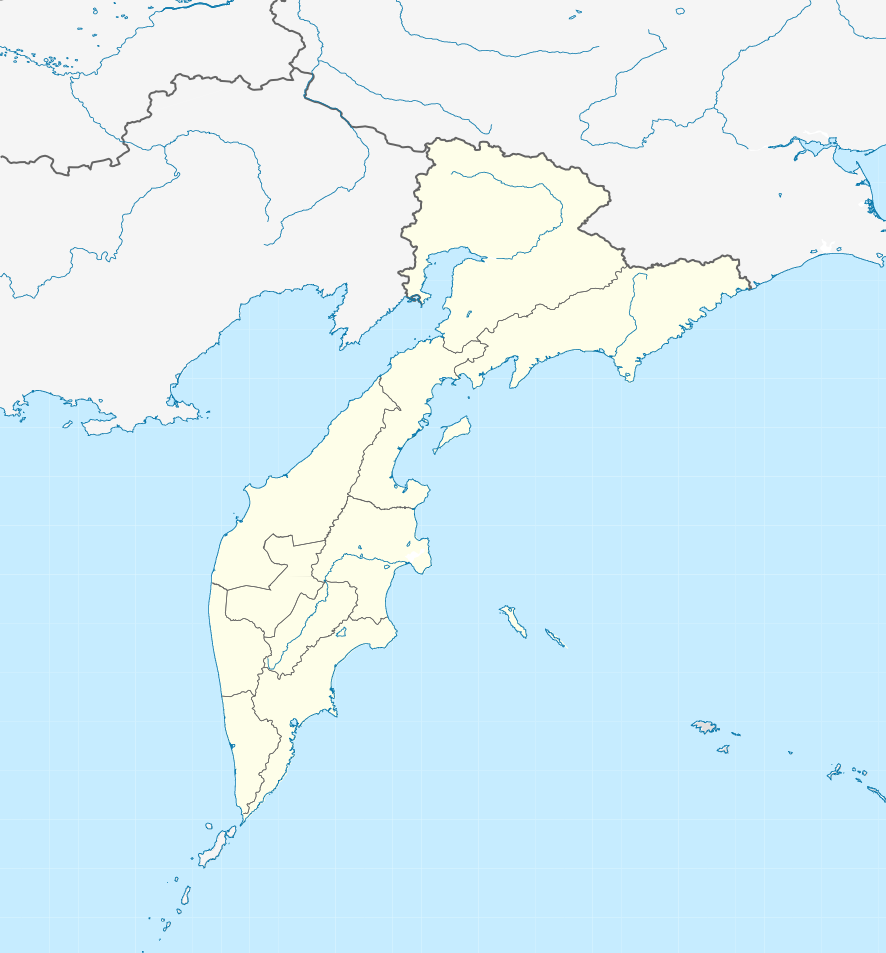
- Location within Kamchatka Krai
- Coordinates: 60°28′45″N 162°5′15″E
- Country: Russian Federation
- Federal subject: Far Eastern Federal District
- Krai: Kamchatka Krai
- Elevation: 26 m (85 ft)

Ivyinichaman (Russian: Ивиньичаман) is an island in Shelikhov Bay, Sea of Okhotsk.

== Geography ==
This relatively flat island is 1.35 km long and 0.4 km wide. It is located off the eastern coast of Penzhina Bay, separated from the continental shore by a 0.6 km wide sound. Administratively it belongs to the Kamchatka Krai. Konus Island is located 7 km to the northeast.
