= Chetyre Paltsa =

Chetyre Paltsa Четыре Пальца
- Island
- Location within Magadan Oblast
- Coordinates: 61°45′N 159°24′E
- Country: Russian Federation
- Federal subject: Far Eastern Federal District
- Oblast: Magadan Oblast

Chetyre Paltsa (Russian: Остров Четыре Пальца) is a small island in the northern shores of Gizhigin Bay, Sea of Okhotsk. It is located 7 km west of the coast of the Varkhalamsky Peninsula.

== Geography ==
Chetyre Paltsa is 800 m (2,600 ft) long and has a maximum width of 600 m (1,960 ft). The town of Evensk is located in the neighboring bay to the northwest.

Administratively Chetyre Paltsa belongs to the Magadan Oblast of the Russian Federation.
