= Glinyanyy Island =

- Island
- Location within Magadan Oblast
- Coordinates: 61°27′N 160°00′E
- Country: Russian Federation
- Federal subject: Magadan Oblast

Glinyanyy Island (Russian: Глинянный остров, Ostrovok Glinyanyy) is a small island on the east side of Gizhigin Bay, in the northeastern Sea of Okhotsk. It is cone shaped.

Administratively Glinyanyy Island belongs to the Magadan Oblast of the Russian Federation.

== History ==
American whaleships hunting bowhead whales frequented the waters off the island from 1862 to 1905. They called it Ell Island, and used the bay to the east of the island as an anchorage, which they called Ell Harbor, short for Othello Harbor, named after a ship that utilized the harbor in the early 1860s. They anchored here to send whaleboats to the head of Gizhigin Bay to cruise for whales and as a shelter from southwest winds, to obtain wood, water, and stone for ballast, to smoke ship to kill rats, and to trade rum with the natives for reindeer. They also went ashore to gather berries and shoot ducks.
