= Cape Povorotnyy =

Cape on the Penzhina Bay in Russia

- Headland
- Location within Magadan Oblast
- Coordinates: 60°43′N 160°46′E
- Country: Russian Federation
- Federal subject: Magadan Oblast

Cape Povorotnyy (Russian: Мыс Поворотный, Mys Povorotnyy) is a headland on the southwest side of Penzhina Bay, the east arm of Shelikhov Gulf, in the northeastern Sea of Okhotsk. It has reddish cliffs and two large pillar rocks, on a detached drying reef, which lie about three miles southeast of the cape. It lies twenty miles east-northeast of Cape Taygonos.

== History ==
American whaleships hunting bowhead whales frequented the waters off the cape from 1862 to 1889. They called it Rocky Point, and Vitaetglia Bay to its west Rocky Point Harbor, where they anchored for shelter from southwesterly gales, to go ashore to get wood and water, stones for ballast, and to shoot mountain sheep.
