= Yamsk =

Rural Locality in Magadan Oblast, Russia

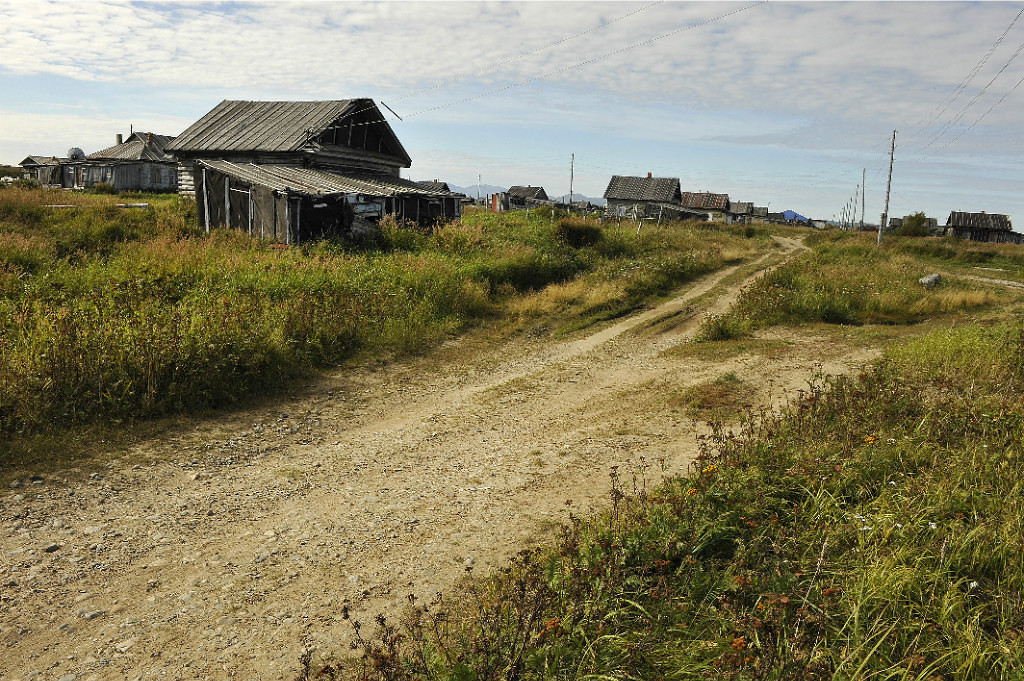
- A rural Russian village
- Interactive map of Yamsk

Yamsk (Russian: Ямск) is a rural locality (a selo) and a port in Olsky District of Magadan Oblast, Russia, located some 200 kilometers (120 mi) east of Magadan, the administrative center of the oblast.

== Geography ==
Yamsk is located by the mouth of the Yama in the Perevolochny estuary, separated by a sandspit from Yam Bay at the southwestern end of Shelikhov Gulf, in the northeastern part of the Sea of Okhotsk.

=== Climate ===
Yamsk's climate is significantly influenced by its proximity to the Sea of Okhotsk. Summers are cool with frequent fog, while winters are bitterly cold and snowy. The average air temperature for the month of January is −22 °C (−8 °F). Yamsk generally records its warmest days in the period from mid-July through the first week of August; the average air temperature during this period is 15 °C (59 °F), but daytime highs can exceed 30 °C (86 °F) on the hottest days. In August there is heavy rain.

The average annual air temperature is −5.2 °C (22.6 °F). The amount of precipitation during the warm period is 192 mm (7.6 in), compared to 327 mm (12.9 in) during the cold period. Up to 37% of the total precipitation falls in October. The average annual wind speed is 5.6 m/s (13 mph); at any time of the year, the dominant direction is northeast and northwest. Thunderstorms are observed extremely rarely, on average no more than 1-2 times throughout the summer, and in some years they do not occur at all. Ice phenomena are observed relatively rarely, mainly at the beginning of winter (November-January).

== History ==
The modern village of Yamsk traces its origins to the Yamsky fort, founded in 1739 by Major of the Yakut Regiment Vasily Merlin. Ostrog became a stronghold of state power on the Okhotsk coast. The inhabitants of the village were Cossacks and sedentary Itelmens (Koryaks); according to the stories of old-timers, the tribe came from Alaska. Some remained to live in Kamchatka and a small group settled on the coast of the Sea of Okhotsk. The fort was surrounded by a palisade; inside there were 25 wooden houses, an office building and an Orthodox chapel built in 1775. At the beginning of the 19th century, 112 residents lived in the village, and by the 1850s, the population had increased to 198. By 1847, a small Orthodox church was built to replace the dilapidated chapel.

By 1908, the population had increased to about 270. After the establishment of Soviet power on the Okhotsk coast in the spring of 1923, the Yamsky Revolutionary Committee was organized. M.I. Kanov, who later became one of the discoverers of Kolyma gold, was elected its first chairman. In March 1929, the first fishing artel, “Down with the private owner”, was created in Yamsk. A school was opened in the village, and a number of public buildings were built. In 1926, by order of the district authorities, the old church was dismantled for firewood, and 5 years later, on the initiative of the local Komsomol organization, the Yamskaya Annunciation Church was transformed into a club, where various circles began to work, performances were staged, and a choir was organized. In the early 1930s, the artel was transformed into the Pyatiletka collective farm, and its board decided to move the village to the large mouth of the Yama, closer to the fishing grounds. In a short period of time in 1938, residential buildings, a school, a hospital, etc. were built here.

According to the population census in 1959, there were over 300 people in 96 households in Yamsk. They successfully engaged in cattle breeding, hunting, fur-bearing animals, game, fur farming, and domestic reindeer husbandry. They also grew oats, carrots, potatoes, and white cabbage. Fishing was then carried out by the newly organized collective farm "Lenin's Banner", which in 1975, after a new merger with the collective farm "Pobeda", became a state farm with a central estate in Takhtoyamsk. In 1979, the Yamsky branch of the state farm was reorganized into the Yamsky state industrial enterprise, which existed until 1993.

== Economy and social infrastructure ==
Residents of the village are engaged in traditional economic activities for the indigenous peoples of the North - fishing, including hunting, harvesting timber and non-timber forest resources for their own needs.

The village has a primary school, a paramedic and midwifery station, and a club. Electricity is supplied from a local diesel power station .

In Yamsk there are 22 four-apartment one-story wooden houses with stove heating, without utilities, built in the 1950s. The length of the road network is 4.5 km (2.8 mi). There is only one payphone in the entire village. As of September 1, 2022, the only school has one student.

== Transportation ==
The peculiarity of the village is its geographical remoteness and inaccessibility; there is no road communication with other settlements. Cargo is delivered during the period of maritime navigation. Regular year-round communication between the village and the regional center is carried out by helicopters; for this purpose, an aviation platform has been established in the village. The ticket price is 4,100 rubles in one direction.

== Flora and fauna ==
Around the settlement grow birch-larch plantations, represented by Dahurian larch and stone birch with a rich shrubby undergrowth, among which there are elderberry rowan, downy alder, two types of honeysuckle, spiraea, bird cherry and several types of willows. Pine and alder dwarf trees are widely represented, as well as Middendorf birch, Kamchatka rhododendron, sedge, horsetail, cotton grass and wild rosemary. Berries include blueberry, cloudberry, lingonberry, crowberry, cranberry, honeysuckle and rowan.

Local fauna include foxes, wolves, brown bears, elk, bighorn sheep, wolverines, sables, ermine, American minks, otters, squirrels and mountain hares.
