= Yam Bay =

Bay in the Sea of Okhotsk, Russia

- Ямская губа
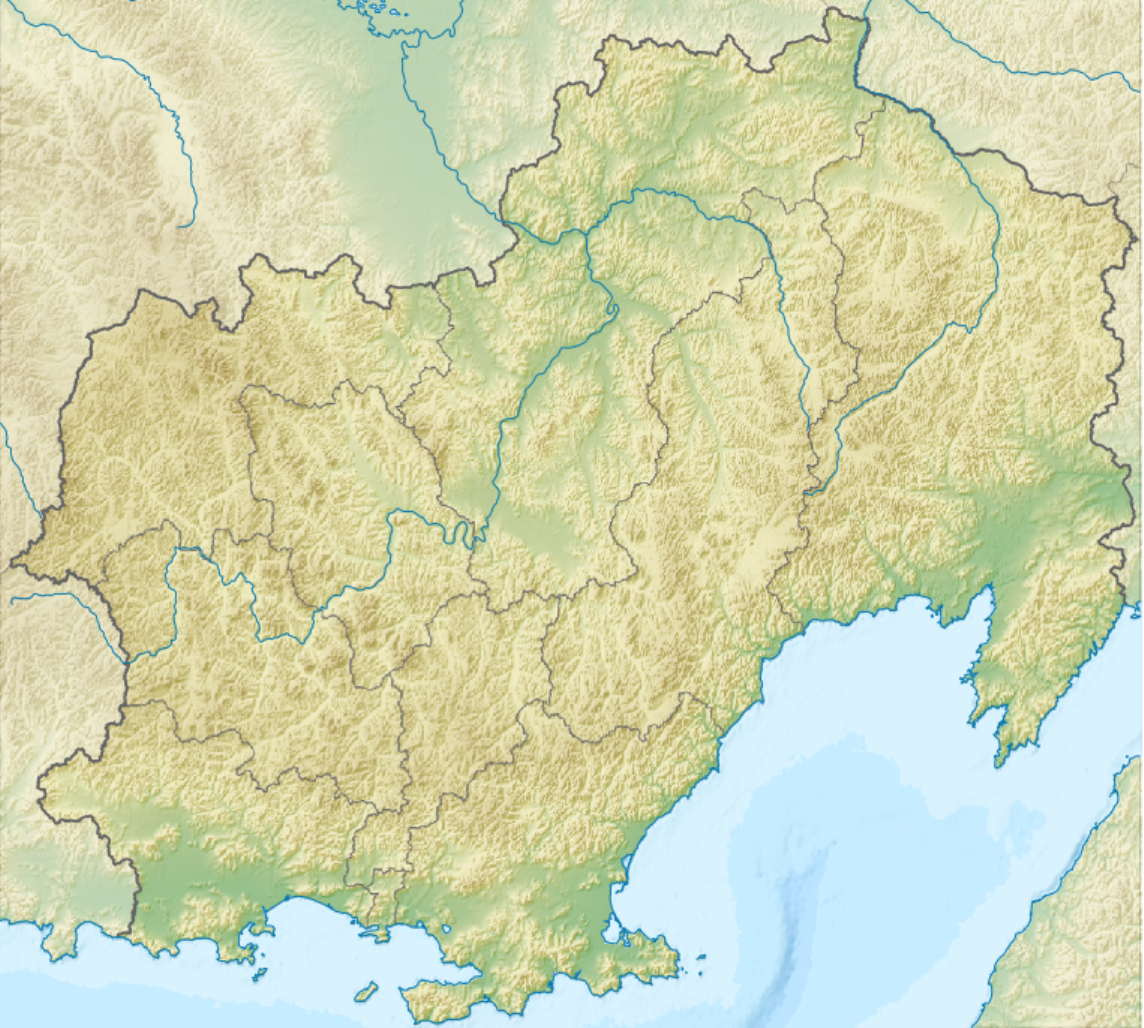
- Location in Magadan Oblast
- Location: Olsky District
- Coordinates: 59°38′N 154°28′E
- River sources: Yama
- Ocean/sea sources: Sea of Okhotsk
- Basin countries: Russia

Yam Bay (Russian: Ямская губа; Yamskaya Guba) is a small bay in the northeastern Sea of Okhotsk. It is located at the southwestern end of the Shelikhov Gulf. To its southeast lie the Yam Islands. River Yama has its mouth in the bay in the Perevolochny estuary by Yamsk.

== Geography and climate ==
Yam Bay is entered between Capes Iretsky to the north and Keytevan to the south, which are separated by 33.8 km (about 21 mi). The high entrance points of the bay merge into a low shore to the west, with tundra plains beyond. From June to the first half of August, winds in the bay are seldom stronger than a fresh breeze, but occasionally reach gale force. Calms prevail in the latter half of August and first part of September. Northeast winds begin in late September, with storms common. Fog is fairly rare. There is ice in the bay from October to late June or early July. Tides are irregular, being diurnal at springs and semidiurnal at neaps. The highest spring tides reach about 6.4 m (21 ft), while neaps reach about 2.1 m (6.9 ft). The tidal currents are strongest in the southern part of the bay, reaching 8 to 8.5 knots during spring tides in July, 5.5 to 6 knots in August, and 4 to 4.5 knots in September.

== History ==
American whaleships hunted bowhead whales in the bay in the 1850s and 1860s. They also traded with the natives for sable and deer.
