= List of shipwrecks in 1755 =

The List of shipwrecks in 1755 includes some ships sunk, wrecked or otherwise lost during 1755.

table of contents
1755
Jan	Feb	Mar	Apr
May	Jun	Jul	Aug
Sep	Oct	Nov	Dec
Unknown date

== January ==
=== 17 January ===
List of shipwrecks: 17 January 1755
Ship	State	Description
Warren	Great Britain	The ship was lost on the coast of Africa. Some of her crew were rescued. She was on a voyage from Liverpool, Lancashire, to Virginia, British America.

=== 19 January ===
List of shipwrecks: 19 January 1755
Ship	State	Description
Jubilee	Great Britain	The ship was driven ashore in Brayson Bay, Isle of Wight, with the loss of her captain. She was on a voyage from Virginia, British America, to London.

=== 24 January ===
List of shipwrecks: 24 January 1755
Ship	State	Description
Cadiz Packet	Great Britain	The ship was driven ashore at Valencia, Spain. She was on a voyage from Falmouth, Cornwall, to Valencia.
Joseph	Great Britain	The ship was driven ashore at Valencia.

=== Unknown date ===
List of shipwrecks: Unknown date 1755
Ship	State	Description
Happy Return	Ireland	The ship foundered in the Irish Sea off Milford, Pembrokeshire, Great Britain. She was on a voyage from Dublin to Bordeaux, France. Her crew were rescued.
John & Elizabeth	Great Britain	The ship was driven ashore near Dieppe, France, with the loss of one life. She was on a voyage from London to Saint-Valery-sur-Somme, France.
John & Mary	Great Britain	The ship was driven ashore near Cádiz, Spain. Her crew were rescued. She was on a voyage from London to Genoa.
Katherine & Anne	Great Britain	The ship was wrecked on the French coast with the loss of her captain. She was on a voyage from Bristol, England, to Morlaix, France.
Two Sisters	Great Britain	The ship was driven ashore near Cádiz. Her crew were rescued. She was on a voyage from Fowey, Cornwall, to Livorno, Grand Duchy of Tuscany.

== February ==
=== 14 February ===
List of shipwrecks: 14 February 1755
Ship	State	Description
Postillion	France	The ship was driven ashore at the mouth of the Rhône.

=== 16 February ===
List of shipwrecks: 16 February 1755
Ship	State	Description
St.Paul de Ribereaux	France	The ship foundered in the English Channel off Pevensey, Sussex, Great Britain. Her crew were rescued.

=== Unknown date ===
List of shipwrecks: Unknown date 1755
Ship	State	Description
John	Ireland	The ship was wrecked at Porto, Portugal. She was on a voyage from Venice to Porto.
Endeavour	Great Britain	The ship was driven ashore on the Irish coast. She was on a voyage from Rhode Island, British America, to London.

== March ==
=== 8 March ===
List of shipwrecks: 8 March 1755
Ship	State	Description
Hazard	France	The schooner was wrecked on Barbuda. She was on a voyage from Sierra Leone to Saint-Domingue.
Kingston	Great Britain	The ship was wrecked on Alderney, Channel Islands, with the loss of all but one of her crew. She was on a voyage from Hull, Yorkshire, to Madeira and Jamaica.

=== 13 March ===
List of shipwrecks: 13 March 1755
Ship	State	Description
Arthur	Great Britain	The ship was lost near Genoa with the loss of six of her crew. She was on a voyage from Naples to Livorno, Grand Duchy of Tuscany.

=== 21 March ===
List of shipwrecks: 21 March 1755
Ship	State	Description
Parthenope	Great Britain	The ship was lost at "Georgenti". Her crew were rescued.

=== Unknown date ===
List of shipwrecks: Unknown date 1755
Ship	State	Description
Adventure	Great Britain	The ship was wrecked at Porto, Portugal. She was on a voyage from Riga, Russia, to Porto.
Carolina	Great Britain	The ship was driven ashore at Amble, Northumberland. Her crew were rescued. She was on a voyage from London to Newcastle upon Tyne, Northumberland.
David	Great Britain	The ship was driven ashore at Beaumaris, Anglesey.
Friendship	Great Britain	The ship was driven ashore at Bridlington, Yorkshire. Her crew were rescued. She was on a voyage from Dunkirk, France, to Newcastle upon Tyne.
Glasgow	Great Britain	The ship was driven ashore near Veere, Dutch Republic. She was on a voyage from the Clyde to Rotterdam, Dutch Republic.
Good Intent	Great Britain	The ship was wrecked on Coquet Island, Northumberland. Her crew were rescued.
Margaret	Great Britain	The ship foundered in the English Channel off Granville, France, with the loss of a crew member. She was on a voyage from Bordeaux, France, to a Scottish port.
St. George	Great Britain	The ship was lost near Lisbon, Portugal. She was on a voyage from London to Lisbon.
St. Mawes	Great Britain	The ship was driven ashore near Margate, Kent. She was on a voyage from Ancona, Papal States, to Hull, Yorkshire.
Sukey	Great Britain	The ship was wrecked on a sandbank off Corton, Suffolk. Her crew survived.

== April ==
=== 4 April ===
List of shipwrecks: 4 April 1755
Ship	State	Description
Achilles	France	The ship foundered in the Atlantic Ocean 40 leagues (120 nautical miles (220 km)) west of La Palma, Canary Islands. Thirteen of her crew survived. She was on a voyage from Martinique to Nantes.

=== 13 April ===
List of shipwrecks: 13 April 1755
Ship	State	Description
Abel & Mary	Great Britain	The ship was wrecked 4 leagues (12 nautical miles (22 km)) east of Málaga, Spain. She was on a voyage from Cette, France, to Boulogne.

=== 23 April ===
List of shipwrecks: 23 April 1755
Ship	State	Description
Ann	Great Britain	The ship was wrecked on the south coast of the Isle of Wight. Her crew were rescued. She was on a voyage from Saint Kitts to London.

=== Unknown date ===
List of shipwrecks: Unknown date 1755
Ship	State	Description
Gloucester Lass	Great Britain	The ship was driven ashore in Mumbles Bay, Glamorgan She was on a voyage from Swansea to Boston.
Molly	Great Britain	The ship was wrecked near Haverfordwest, Pembrokeshire. She was on a voyage from Saint Kitts to London.
Neptune	Dutch Republic	The ship was wrecked in the Isles of Scilly, Great Britain. She was on a voyage from Smyrna, Ottoman Empire, to Rotterdam.

== May ==
=== Unknown date ===
List of shipwrecks: Unknown date 1755
Ship	State	Description
Neptune		22px Hamburg: The ship was lost near Hamburg. She was on a voyage from South Carolina, British America, to Hamburg via Cowes, Isle of Wight, Great Britain.
Nightingale	Great Britain	The ship was wrecked on the South Battery Rocks, Sunderland, County Durham.
Providence	Great Britain	The ship was lost on the coast of Cornwall. She was on a voyage from Cette to Dunkirk, France.

== June ==
=== 8 June ===
List of shipwrecks: 8 June 1755
Ship	State	Description
John & Rebecca	Great Britain	The ship was lost on Heneaga. She was on a voyage from Jamaica to Philadelphia, Pennsylvania, British America.

=== 9 June ===
List of shipwrecks: 9 June 1755
Ship	State	Description
Andalusia	Spain	The ship was lost off Jamaica. Her crew were rescued. She was on a voyage from Cartagena, New Spain, to Málaga.

=== 10 June ===
List of shipwrecks: 10 June 1755
Ship	State	Description
Katherina	Sweden	The snow was wrecked on the Goodwin Sands, Kent, Great Britain. Her crew were rescued. She was on a voyage from Stockholm to Havre de Grâce, France.

== July ==
=== 1 July ===
List of shipwrecks: 1 July 1755
Ship	State	Description
Ann & Esther	Great Britain	The ship foundered in the Atlantic Ocean 50 leagues (150 nautical miles (280 km) north north west of Cape Finisterre, Spain. Her crew survived. She was on a voyage from Chester, Cheshire, to Marseille, France.

=== 17 July ===
List of shipwrecks: 17 July 1755
Ship	State	Description
Doddington	British East India Company	The East Indiaman was wrecked in Algoa Bay with the loss of 247 of the 270 people on board.

=== 18 July ===
List of shipwrecks: 18 July 1755
Ship	State	Description
Abel & Mary	Great Britain	The ship was lost at Boulogne, France. She was on a voyage from Cette to Boulogne.

=== Unknown date ===
List of shipwrecks: Unknown date 1755
Ship	State	Description
Friendship	Great Britain	The ship was lost near Danzig. She was on a voyage from Stockholm, Sweden, to Bristol.

== August ==
=== Unknown date ===
List of shipwrecks: Unknown date 1755
Ship	State	Description
Allen	Great Britain	The ship was lost off Dunkirk, France. She was on a voyage from Bremen to Lisbon, Portugal.
Providence	Great Britain	The ship was lost in the Isles of Scilly. Her crew were rescued. She was on a voyage from Madeira to London.
Resolution	Great Britain	The whaler was lost near Liverpool, Lancashire.
Warminster	Great Britain	The ship was lost in the North Channel. She was on a voyage from Saint Croix to Bristol, Gloucestershire.

== September ==
=== 2 September ===
List of shipwrecks: 2 September 1755
Ship	State	Description
William and Mary	Great Britain	The ship was lost near Genoa. Gje was on a voyage from Genoa to Lisbon, Portugal.

=== 27 September ===
List of shipwrecks: 27 September 1755
Ship	State	Description
York	Great Britain	The ship foundered in the North Sea 8 leagues (24 nautical miles (44 km)) off Whitby, Yorkshire. Her crew were rescued. She was on a voyage from Newcastle upon Tyne, Northumberland, to Great Yarmouth, Norfolk

=== Unknown date ===
List of shipwrecks: Unknown date 1755
Ship	State	Description
Hardie	France	The ship foundered in the English Channel whilst on a voyage from Plymouth, Devon, to Portsmouth, Hampshire, Great Britain.
Mary-Ann	France	The ship foundered in the English Channel whilst on a voyage from Plymouth to Portsmouth.
Nancy	Great Britain	The ship was lost at "Cliesdon". She was on a voyage from Jamaica to Bristol, Gloucestershire.
Pleixcilière	France	The ship foundered in the English Channel whilst on a voyage from Plymouth to Portsmouth.
Princess Augusta	Great Britain	The ship was lost near Milford, Pembrokeshire. Her crew were rescued. She was on a voyage from Bristol, Gloucestershire, to Chester, Cheshire.
Samuel	Great Britain	The ship was lost on the south coast of the Isle of Wight. Her crew were rescued. She was on a voyage from Saint Kitts to London.
Winsor	Great Britain	The ship departed from London for Coleraine, County Antrim, Ireland, during September. No further trace, presumed foundered with the loss of all hands.

== October ==
=== 5 October ===
List of shipwrecks: 5 October 1755
Ship	State	Description
Edward	Great Britain	The ship was wrecked 4 Leagues (12 nautical miles (22 km) north of Mastrand, Sweden. Her crew were rescued. She was on a voyage from Danzig to Dover, Kent.

=== 6 October ===
List of shipwrecks: 6 October 1755
Ship	State	Description
Dan	Ireland	The ship ran aground on the Wicklow Banks, in the Irish Sea and was wrecked. She was on a voyage from Dublin to Livorno, Grand Duchy of Tuscany.

=== 14 October ===
List of shipwrecks: 14 October 1755
Ship	State	Description
Swallow	Great Britain	The ship departed from Falmouth, Cornwall, for A Coruña, Spain. No further trace, presumed foundered with the loss of all hands.

=== Unknown date ===
List of shipwrecks: Unknown date 1755
Ship	State	Description
Ann & Mary	Great Britain	The ship was lost on the Wolf Rock, Cornwall. Her crew were rescued. She was on a voyage from Bristol, Gloucestershire, to Poole, Dorset.
Betty	Great Britain	The ship was lost near Holyhead, Anglesey. Her crew were rescued. She was on a voyage from Jamaica to Liverpool, Lancashire.
Jane	Great Britain	The ship was wrecked on Jersey, Channel Islands, with some loss of life. She was on a voyage from Antigua to London.
Mediterranean	Great Britain	The ship foundered in the Baltic Sea off Gotland, Sweden. She was on a voyage from Saint Petersburg, Russia, to Chester, Cheshire.
Richard	Great Britain	The ship was lost on the "Medwharf". She was on a voyage from Tortola to Liverpool.
St. Andrew	Great Britain	The ship was wrecked on the Scottish coast. She was on a voyage from Riga, Russia, to Dumfries.
Stirling Castle	Great Britain	The ship was driven ashore and wrecked at Formby, Lancashire. She was on a voyage from Saint Kitts to Liverpool.
Triton	Great Britain	The ship was wrecked on the Welsh coast with the loss of all hands. She was on a voyage from Barbados to Bristol.

== November ==
=== 9 November ===
List of shipwrecks: 9 November 1755
Ship	State	Description
William and Mary	Great Britain	The ship was lost off Great Yarmouth, Norfolk. She was on a voyage from Guernsey, Channel Islands, to King's Lynn, Norfolk.

=== 16 November ===
List of shipwrecks: 16 November 1755
Ship	State	Description
Seahorse	Great Britain	The ship was wrecked near Waterford, Ireland. She was on a voyage from Saint Kitts to Liverpool, Lancashire.

=== 29 November ===
List of shipwrecks: 29 November 1755
Ship	State	Description
Purcell	Denmark	The ship was wrecked on the Goodwin Sands, Kent, Great Britain. Seven crew were rescued by a Dutch vessel. She was on a voyage from Copenhagen to Saint Croix.

=== Unknown date ===
List of shipwrecks: Unknown date 1755
Ship	State	Description
Amity	Great Britain	The ship was wrecked on The Cockles. She was on a voyage from Danzig to London.
Benjamin	France	The ship was lost near the Île d'Oléron. She was on a voyage from Martinique to Bordeaux.
Duc de Berry	France	The ship was lost near the Île d'Oleron. She was on a voyage from Martinique to Bordeaux.
Good Intent	Great Britain	The ship was driven ashore at Beachy Head, Sussex. She was on a voyage from Málaga, Spain, to London.
Isabella	Great Britain	The ship foundered whilst on a voyage from Leith, Lothian, to Plymouth, Devon.
Jennings	Great Britain	The ship was driven ashore at Orfordness, Suffolk.
John & Philip	Great Britain	The ship was wrecked on the Sandwich Flats. She was on a voyage from Plymouth to London.
La Ferme	France	The ship was lost near Ramsgate, Kent, Great Britain. She was on a voyage from Marseille to Havre de Grâce.
Levant	Great Britain	The ship was driven ashore at North Foreland, Kent. Her crew were rescued. She was on a voyage from Livorno, Grand Duchy of Tuscany, to London.
Mermaid	Great Britain	The ship was driven ashore at Margate, Kent. She was on a voyage from Málaga, Spain, to London.
Nancy	Great Britain	The ship was driven ashore near St Mawes Castle, Cornwall. She was on a voyage from Falmouth, Cornwall, to Barcelona, Spain.
Neptune	Great Britain	The ship was lost near Wells-next-the-Sea, Norfolk. She was on a voyage from Weymouth, Dorset, to King's Lynn, Norfolk.
Oporto Merchant	Great Britain	The ship was driven ashore on Guernsey, Channel Islands. She was on a voyage from Málaga, Spain, to London.
Unity	Great Britain	The ship was lost in the Dogger Bank. She was on a voyage from Kirkwall, Orkney Islands, to Whitby, Yorkshire.
Young William	Ireland	The ship was wrecked on the Lancashire coast with the loss of all but two of her crew. She was on a voyage from Málaga to Dublin.

== December ==
=== 15 December ===
List of shipwrecks: 15 December 1755
Ship	State	Description
Hannah & Betty	Ireland	The ship was driven ashore and wrecked on the North Bull, Dublin. Her crew were rescued. She was on a voyage from Bordeaux, France, to Dublin.

=== 25 December ===
List of shipwrecks: 25 December 1755
Ship	State	Description
Hester	(Kingdom of Great Britain) British America	The sloop was wrecked at the Currituck Inlet, North Carolina. Her crew were rescued. She was on a voyage from Philadelphia, Pennsylvania, to Annapolis, Maryland.
Penguin	(Kingdom of Great Britain) British America	The sloop was wrecked at Lynnhaven, Virginia. She was on a voyage from Maryland to Wilmington, Pennsylvania.

=== Unknown date ===
List of shipwrecks: Unknown date 1755
Ship	State	Description
Acton	Great Britain	The ship was wrecked near Llanelly, Glamorgan. Her crew were rescued. She was on a voyage from Málaga, Spain, to London.
Anna-Maria	Dutch Republic	The ship foundered in the English Channel off the Isle of Wight, Great Britain, with the loss of all but two of her crew. She was on a voyage from Surinam to Amsterdam.
Expedition	Great Britain	The ship was lost near Cádiz, Spain. Her crew were rescued. She was on a voyage from Falmouth, Cornwall, to Naples.
Lively Nancy	Great Britain	The ship was lost near Hamburg.
Pulcrade	Portugal	The ship was wrecked on the Galician coast, Spain. She was on a voyage from Porto to "Balica".
Sarah & Rebecca	Great Britain	The ship was wrecked on the coast of South Wales.
Three Crowns	Great Britain	The ship was driven ashore and wrecked in Bigbury Bay, Devon. She was on a voyage from Stockholm, Sweden, to Bristol, Gloucestershire.

== Unknown date ==
List of shipwrecks: Unknown date 1755
Ship	State	Description
Brown	(Kingdom of Great Britain) British America	The galley was lost near Anguilla. She was on a voyage from Providence, Rhode Island, to the West Indies.
Carolina	Great Britain	The ship was lost near Willemstad, Curaçao. She was on a voyage from Carolina, British America, to Rotterdam, Dutch Republic.
Duke of Cumberland	(Kingdom of Great Britain) Jersey	The ship was lost on the coast of Newfouldland, British America.
Hopewell	Great Britain	The ship was lost near Seskar. She was on a voyage from Saint Petersburg, Russia, to London.
James and Christopher	Portugal	The ship was driven ashore and wrecked near Mazagan, Morocco.
Jehoakim	Spain	The ship was lost in the Passage Islands. She was on a voyage from Caracas, New Spain, to Cádiz.
Jersey	(Kingdom of Great Britain) Jersey	The ship was lost on the coast of Newfoundland.
Martin	Great Britain	The brigantine foundered before 3 February whilst on a voyage from Campeche, New Spain, to the West Indies. Her crew were rescued.
Marmaduke	Great Britain	The ship foundered in the Baltic Sea. She was on a voyage from Hull, Yorkshire, to Saint Petersburg.
Montfort	Great Britain	The ship was wrecked on the Morant Cays, Jamaica. She was on a voyage from Jamaica to Bristol, Gloucestershire.
Nazareth	Great Britain	The ship was lost off Lagos. Her crew were rescued. She was reported to be on a voyage from Wales to Marseille, France.
Notre Dame de Deliverance	France	The ship foundered whilst on a voyage from Havana, Cuba, to Cádiz, Spain.
Prince William	Great Britain	The ship was driven ashore and wrecked at "Dino".
Salisbury	Great Britain	The ship was wrecked on the "Colorados" with the loss of a crew member. She was on a voyage from British Honduras to New York, British America.
Sally & Lucy	Great Britain	The ship was driven ashore and wrecked at "Cerela".
Svyatoy Pyotr (Святой Пётр, 'St. Peter')	Imperial Russian Navy	The nl:hoeker was driven ashore and wrecked at the mouth of the ru:Bolshaya Vorovskaya. She was on a voyage from Yamsk to Okhotsk. See also: List of shipwrecks in 1753 § 12 October
Susannah	Great Britain	The ship was lost at Bombay, Mughal Empire.
Union	Great Britain	The ship was lost near Cape Cod, Massachusetts, British America, with the loss of all hands. She was on a voyage from London to Boston, Massachusetts.
Venus	Great Britain	The ship was lost near Porto, Portugal. She was on a voyage from Porto to Guernsey, Channel Islands.
