= List of shipwrecks in 1753 =

The List of shipwrecks in 1753 includes some ships sunk, wrecked or otherwise lost during 1753.

table of contents
1753
Jan	Feb	Mar	Apr
May	Jun	Jul	Aug
Sep	Oct	Nov	Dec
Unknown date

== January ==
=== 10 January ===
List of shipwrecks: 10 January 1753
Ship	State	Description
Anne	Great Britain	The ship was driven ashore south of Ramsgate, Kent.
Dover	Great Britain	The ship was driven ashore between Ramsgate and Broadstairs. She was on a voyage from New York, British America, to London.

=== 12 January ===
List of shipwrecks: 12 January 1753
Ship	State	Description
Johanna Theresa Strohm	Hamburg	The ship was driven ashore at Portland, Dorset, Great Britain, with the loss of six of her crew. She was on a voyage from Hamburg to Cádiz, Spain.

=== 30 January ===
List of shipwrecks: 30 January 1753
Ship	State	Description
Owners Endeavour	(Kingdom of Great Britain) Guernsey	The ship foundered in the English Channel off the coast of Kent. Her crew were rescued.

=== Unknown date ===
List of shipwrecks: Unknown date 1753
Ship	State	Description
Abraham	Great Britain	The ship foundered in Cudden Bay, Cornwall, before 19 January with the loss of all hands.
Adrian	France	The ship foundered in the English Channel off the Isle of Wight, Great Britain, before 12 January. She was on a voyage from Bordeaux, Gironde, to Boulogne, Pas-de-Calais.
Amity	Great Britain	The ship foundered in Fishguard Bay before 12 January with the loss of two of her crew. She was on a voyage from Cork, Ireland, to Bristol, England.
Argyle	Great Britain	The ship was driven ashore and wrecked near Pool, Dorset, before 12 January. She was on a voyage from Glasgow, Renfrewshire, to London.
Arms of Denmark	Hamburg	The ship foundered in the English Channel off Pool before 23 January. She was on a voyage from Bristol to Hamburg.
Birmingham	Great Britain	The ship was lost near Brighthelmstone, Sussex, before 19 January. Her crew were rescued. She was on a voyage from St. Lucar, Spain, to Ostend, West Flanders, Dutch Republic.
Crown'd Herring	Great Britain	The ship was lost off Loe, Cornwall, before 23 January. She was on a voyage from Bordeaux to Dunkerque, Nord, France.
Daniel	Dutch Republic	The ship foundered in Whitesand Bay, Cornwall, before 19 January. She was on a voyage from Suriname to Amsterdam, North Holland
De Liefde	Dutch Republic	The ship foundered in the English Channel off the Isle of Wight before 19 January.
Duke of Dorset	Great Britain	The ship was lost on the Barbary Coast. Her crew were rescued. She was on a voyage from "Cerella" to London.
Enegyht	Dutch Republic	The ship foundered in the English Channel off Newhaven, Sussex, Great Britain, before 12 January. She was on a voyage from Bordeaux to Amsterdam.
Friendship	Great Britain	The ship foundered in the English Channel of the Isle of Wight before 12 January. She was on a voyage from Bristol, Gloucestershire, to Hamburg.
Griffin	Great Britain	The ship foundered in the Atlantic Ocean off Cape San Antonio, Spain. She was on a voyage from Jamaica to London.
Jacob	Great Britain	The ship was driven ashore at St Helen's, Isle of Wight, before 12 January. She was on a voyage from Rhode Island, British America, to London.
Johannis	Danzig	The ship was lost on the Swedish coast before 23 January. Her crew were rescued. She was on a voyage from London to Danzig.
John	(Kingdom of Great Britain) Isle of Man	The ship was lost near Wexford, Ireland, before 26 January. Her crew were rescued. She was on a voyage from Saint Martin to the Isle of Man.
John and Daniel	Great Britain	The ship was lost near Newcastle upon Tyne, Northumberland, before 19 January. Her crew were rescued.
Jupiter	Great Britain	The ship was lost near Boulogne before 23 January with the loss of a passenger. She was on a voyage from New York to London.
King of Prussia	Hamburg	The ship was driven ashore near Kimeridge, Dorset, before 12 January. She was on a voyage from Bordeaux to Hamburg.
Lark	Great Britain	The ship was lost at Cette, Hérault, France, before 26 January with the loss of a crew member.
Lovely Betty	Great Britain	The ship was lost off Kinsale, County Cork, Ireland, before 26 January with the loss of most of those on board. She was on a voyage from North Carolina, British America, to Liverpool, Lancashire.
Medonia del Carmen	Spain	The ship was lost off Mahón, Menorca. She was on a voyage from Santa Cruz de Tenerife to Livorno, Grand Duchy of Tuscany.
Peggy	Great Britain	The ship foundered in the English Channel off Shoreham-by-Sea, Sussex, before 26 January. She was on a voyage from Glasgow to Rotterdam, South Holland, Dutch Republic.
Patty and Molly	Great Britain	The ship was lost before 19 January whilst on a voyage from Surinam to Boston.
Samuel	Ireland	The ship was driven ashore on the Isle of Wight opposite Hurst Castle, Hampshire, before 12 January. She was on a voyage from Saint Kitts to London.
Sarah	Great Britain	The ship foundered in the English Channel off Newhaven before 12 January with the loss of a crew member. She was on a voyage from Maryland, British America, to London.
St. Paul	Ireland	The brig departed from New York, British America, for Newry in late January. No further trace, presumed foundered with the loss of all hands.
St. Philip	Great Britain	The ship was lost near San Sebastián, Spain, before 19 January. She was on a voyage from Nova Scotia, British America, to Bilbao, Spain.
Swan Hoolm	Hamburg	The ship foundered in the English Channel off the Isle of Wight before 12 January. She was on a voyage from Hamburg to Porto, Portugal.
Thomas and Rebecca	Great Britain	The ship foundered in the Irish Sea off Wexford, Ireland, before 19 January. She was on a voyage from London to Dublin.
Union	Great Britain	The ship foundered in the English Channel off Beachy Head, Sussex, before 16 January. She was on a voyage from Limerick, Ireland, to London.
William and Mary	Ireland	The ship foundered whilst on a voyage from Cork to Nantes, Loire-Atlantique, France. Her crew were rescued by a Danzig vessel.
Young Green	Ireland	The ship foundered in the English Channel off the Isle of Wight before 12 January. She was on a voyage from Dublin to Pool.
Young Hendrik	Dutch Republic	The ship foundered in the English Channel off Newhaven before 12 January. She was on a voyage from Lisbon, Portugal, to Amsterdam.

== February ==
=== 14 February ===
List of shipwrecks: 14 February 1753
Ship	State	Description
Bess	Great Britain	The ship was driven ashore at Greenock, Renfrewshire.
Confidence	Great Britain	The ship was driven ashore and wrecked at Greenock.
Mary	Great Britain	The ship was driven ashore at Greenock. She was later refloated

=== 15 February ===
List of shipwrecks: 15 February 1753
Ship	State	Description
Deakins and Maudley	Great Britain	The ship was lost on the south coast of the Isle of Wight with the loss of her captain.

=== Unknown date ===
List of shipwrecks: Unknown date 1753
Ship	State	Description
Anne & Margaret	Great Britain	The ship foundered in the Irish Sea off Waterford, Ireland, before 16 February with the loss of all hands. She was on a voyage from Swansea, Glamorgan, to St Martin's.
Industry	Great Britain	The ship foundered in the Irish Sea before 27 February.
Ufro Jacoba	Dutch Republic	The ship foundered in the North Sea before 9 February with the loss of all hands.

== March ==
4 March

List of shipwrecks: March 1753
Ship	State	Description
Mary	Great Britain	The ship foundered in the Mediterranean Sea 13 leagues (39 nautical miles (72 km)) of Marseille, France. Her crew were rescued. She was on a voyage from Marseille to Nantes, France.

=== 8 March ===
List of shipwrecks: 8 March 1753
Ship	State	Description
St. George	Great Britain	The ship was wrecked 3 leagues (9 nautical miles (17 km)) east of Gibraltar with the loss of a crew member. She was on a voyage from Naples to Great Britain.

=== 12 March ===
List of shipwrecks: 12 March 1753
Ship	State	Description
Dolphin	Great Britain	The ship foundered in the Irish Sea. Her crew were rescued. She was on a voyage from Liverpool, Lancashire, to Ipswich, Suffolk. 14 March
Hunter	Great Britain	The ship was wrecked on Lizard Point, Cornwall. Her crew were rescued. She was on a voyage from Barbados to London.

=== 15 March ===
List of shipwrecks: 15 March 1753
Ship	State	Description
Mermaid	Great Britain	The ship foundered in the North Sea off Easton Ness, Suffolk. Her crew were rescued.
Nancy	Great Britain	The ship ran ashore at Kessingland, Suffolk.
Ridley	Great Britain	The ship ran ashore at Kessingland.

=== 25 March ===
List of shipwrecks: 25 March 1753
Ship	State	Description
Lucy	Ireland	The ship was driven ashore at Southsea Castle, Hampshire, Great Britain. Her crew were rescued. She was on a voyage from Rouen, Seine-Maritime, France to Dublin. She was later refloated and taken in to Portsmouth, Hampshire.

=== 26 March ===
List of shipwrecks: 26 March 1753
Ship	State	Description
Mary & Susanna	Ireland	The ship was wrecked on The Smalls with the loss of four of her thirteen crew. She was on voyage from Dublin to Bilbao, Spain.

=== Unknown date ===
List of shipwrecks: Unknown date 1753
Ship	State	Description
Hopewell	Great Britain	The ship capsized in River Seine at Rouen, seine-Maritime, France before 20 March. Her crew were rescued.
John	Great Britain	The ship was lost on the North Elve sandbank before 27 March. Her crew were rescued.
Katherine	Great Britain	The ship was lost near Belfast, County Antrim, Ireland, before 13 March. Her crew were rescued.
Nostra Señora Daboa Viagam	Spain	The ship was lost on a voyage from Porto, Portugal, to Ferrol.
Osnor das Chagas	Spain	The ship was lost on a voyage from Porto to Ferrol.

== April ==
=== 7 April ===
List of shipwrecks: 7 April 1753
Ship	State	Description
Montague	Great Britain	The ship went aground on the Sandwich Flats with the loss of her captain.

=== 20 April ===
List of shipwrecks: 20 April 1753
Ship	State	Description
Everton	Great Britain	The ship was lost near the Currituck Inlet, North Carolina, British America. All on board were rescued.

=== 26 April ===
List of shipwrecks: 26 April 1753
Ship	State	Description
Two Brothers	Great Britain	The ship foundered in the Gulf of Florida. Her crew were rescued by Effingham (Great Britain).

=== Unknown date ===
List of shipwrecks: Unknown date 1753
Ship	State	Description
HMS Assurance	(Kingdom of Great Britain) Royal Navy	The fifth-rate frigate was wrecked on The Needles, Isle of Wight.
Betty	Great Britain	The ship was destroyed by fire at Lisbon, Portugal. She was on a voyage from Lisbon to Genoa with a cargo of sugar.
Christian	Great Britain	The ship was lost in Murry Bay. She was on a voyage from Milford, Pembrokeshire, to Rochelle, France.

== May ==
=== 9 May ===
List of shipwrecks: 9 May 1753
Ship	State	Description
Elizabeth	Great Britain	The ship foundered in the Atlantic Ocean a league (3 nautical miles (5.6 km)) off Padstow, Cornwall. She was on a voyage from Bordeaux to the Isle of Man.

=== Unknown date ===
List of shipwrecks: Unknown date 1753
Ship	State	Description
Anne	Great Britain	The ship foundered in the Bristol Channel off Hartland Point, Devon. She was on a voyage from London to Bristol, Gloucestershire.
Susannah	(Kingdom of Great Britain) British America	The schooner sprung a leak and was consequently beached on the coast of North Carolina, where she was wrecked. She was on a voyage from Charlestown, South Carolina, to New York.
Volunteer	Great Britain	The ship sank at Dublin, Ireland. She was on a voyage from Jamaica to Liverpool, Lancashire.

== June ==
=== 3 June ===
List of shipwrecks: 3 June 1753
Ship	State	Description
HDMS Falster	Royal Dano-Norwegian Navy	The frigate caught fire and exploded off Safi, Morocco, with the loss of 132 of her crew.

=== 6 June ===
List of shipwrecks: 6 June 1753
Ship	State	Description
Bredenhof	Dutch East India Company	The East Indiaman struck the Silva Shoal in the Mozambique Channel and sank.

== July ==
=== Unknown date ===
List of shipwrecks: Unknown date 1753
Ship	State	Description
Prince Frederick	Great Britain	The ship was lost in The Swin. Her crew were rescued. She was on a voyage from Narva, Russia, to London.
Seahorse	Great Britain	The ship foundered in the Baltic Sea. She was on a voyage from London to Saint Petersburg, Russia.

== August ==
=== 5 August ===
List of shipwrecks: 5 August 1753
Ship	State	Description
De Vrede	Dutch Republic	The ship was lost at Salcombe, Devon, Great Britain. Her crew were rescued. She was on a voyage from St. Lucar, Spain, to Amsterdam.
Polly	Great Britain	The ship was driven ashore at Ramsgate, Kent.
St. Katherine	Dutch Republic	The ship was lost at Salcombe with the loss of nine of her crew. She was on a voyage from St. Lucar to Amsterdam.

=== 20 August ===
List of shipwrecks: 20 August 1753
Ship	State	Description
Andriana	Stettin	The ship was wrecked on the Cross Sand, in the North Sea off Great Yarmouth, Norfolk, Great Britain. Her crew were rescued. She was on a voyage from Stettin to Brest, France.

== September ==
=== 2 September ===
List of shipwrecks: 2 September 1753
Ship	State	Description
Sv. Ieremiia	Russian Empire	The vessel was driven onto rocks and wrecked at Adak Island, Alaska, after her anchor cable parted. The wreck may have occurred a day later, and at another nearby island. Survivors constructed a vessel from the wreckage and sailed away in 1754.

=== 3 September ===
List of shipwrecks: 3 September 1753
Ship	State	Description
Anna Christiana	Sweden	The ship foundered in the Baltic Sea. Her crew were rescued. She was on a voyage from Karlskrona to Saint Petersburg, Russia.
Thomas	Bremen	The ship foundered in the Baltic Sea off Libava, Duchy of Courland and Semigallia with the loss of all hands. She was on a voyage from Bremen to Riga, Russia.

=== Unknown date ===
List of shipwrecks: Unknown date 1753
Ship	State	Description
Flying Fish	(Kingdom of Great Britain) British America	The sloop was lost on or about 10 September. Her crew were rescued. She was on a voyage from Philadelphia, Pennsylvania, to North Carolina.
St George	Great Britain	The ship was lost near Chichester, Sussex. She was on a voyage from Cork, Ireland and Milford, Pembrokeshire, to London.

== October ==
=== 2 October ===
List of shipwrecks: 2 October 1753
Ship	State	Description
Juliana	Sweden	The ship was lost off Öland. She was on a voyage from Stockholm to Marseille, France.

=== 3 October ===
List of shipwrecks: 3 October 1753
Ship	State	Description
Brockholes	Great Britain	The ship was driven ashore in the Orkney Islands. She was on a voyage from Saint Petersburg, Russia, to Lancaster, Lancashire.

=== 12 October ===
List of shipwrecks: 12 October 1753
Ship	State	Description
Svyatoy Ioann Krestitel (Святой Иоанн Креститель, 'St. John the Baptist')	Imperial Russian Navy	The packet boat ran aground and was wrecked at the mouth of the Ozyornaya River with the loss of five of her crew. She was on a voyage from Okhotsk to Kamchatka.
Svyatoy Pyotr (Святой Пётр, 'St. Peter')	Imperial Russian Navy	The nl:hoeker was driven ashore between the river mouths of the ru:Bolshaya Vorovskaya and the ru:Kolpakova with the loss of twelve of her crew. She was on a voyage from Okhotsk to Kamchatka. Subsequently refloated, repaired and returned to service. See also: List of shipwrecks in 1755 § Unknown date

=== 13 October ===
List of shipwrecks: 13 October 1753
Ship	State	Description
Nadezhda (Надежда)	Imperial Russian Navy	The dubel boat ran aground in the mouth of the Bolshaya and was completely wrecked on 19 October. She was on a voyage from Okhotsk to Medny Island.

=== 22 October ===
List of shipwrecks: 22 October 1753
Ship	State	Description
St. Johannis	Sweden	The ship was driven ashore near Padstow, Cornwall, Great Britain. She was plundered by the local inhabitants.

=== Unknown date ===
List of shipwrecks: Unknown date 1753
Ship	State	Description
Duke of Cumberland	Great Britain	The ship foundered in the North Sea off Great Yarmouth, Norfolk. She was bound for London from a Norwegian port.
Good Intent	Great Britain	The ship was lost near "Steanage"
Olive Branch	Great Britain	The ship was lost on the Haisborough Sands, in the North Sea off the coast of Norfolk. She was on a voyage from Gothenburg, Sweden, to London.
Prudent Sarah	Great Britain	The ship was wrecked in the Orkney Islands. She was on a voyage from London and Newcastle-upon-Tyne, Northumberland, to Boston, Massachusetts, British America.
Rainbow	Great Britain	The ship was driven ashore at Dingle, County Kerry, Ireland. She was on a voyage from Nevis to Bristol, Gloucestershire.

== November ==
=== 8 November ===
List of shipwrecks: 8 November 1753
Ship	State	Description
Britannia	Great Britain	The ship was lost on the Woolpack Sand. She was on a voyage from London to Philadelphia, Pennsylvania, British America.

=== 15 November ===
List of shipwrecks: 15 November 1753
Ship	State	Description
William & Mary	Ireland	The ship was wrecked near Llanelly, Glamorgan, Great Britain, with the loss of 89 of the 90 people on board. She was on a voyage from Newfoundland, British America, to Waterford.

=== Unknown date ===
List of shipwrecks: Unknown date 1753
Ship	State	Description
Happy Couple	Great Britain	The ship foundered in the Bristol Channel. She was on a voyage from Padstow, Cornwall, to Bristol, Gloucestershire.
Houlsteena	Great Britain	The ship was lost in Liverpool Bay. She was on a voyage from Newry, County Armagh, Ireland, to Liverpool, Lancashire.
Nancy	Ireland	The ship foundered off Cape St. Martins, Spain. Her crew survived. She was on a voyage from an Irish port to Gibraltar and Alicante.

== December ==
=== 4 December ===
List of shipwrecks: 4 December 1753
Ship	State	Description
Heneda	Dutch Republic	The galliot was wrecked near Penzance, Cornwall, Kingdom of Great Britain. She was on a voyage from Bordeaux, France, to Amsterdam.

=== 12 December ===
List of shipwrecks: 12 December 1753
Ship	State	Description
Young Abraham	Hamburg	The ship was driven ashore at Dungeness, Kent, Great Britain. She was on a voyage from Bordeaux, France, to Hamburg.

=== 13 December ===
List of shipwrecks: 13 December 1753
Ship	State	Description
Dragon	Dutch Republic	The ship was wrecked on the Isle of Wight, Great Britain. She was on a voyage from a Spanish port to Rotterdam.

=== 14 December ===
List of shipwrecks: 14 December 1753
Ship	State	Description
Le Vainquer	France	The ship was wrecked at Sker Point, Glamorgan, Great Britain, with the loss of three of the eleven people on board. She was on a voyage from Lisbon, Portugal, to Le Havre.

=== 19 December ===
List of shipwrecks: 19 December 1753
Ship	State	Description
Union	Great Britain	The ship foundered in the Bristol Channel off Barnstaple, Devon, with the loss of six lives. She was on a voyage from Cork, Ireland, to Bristol, Gloucestershire.

=== Unknown date ===
List of shipwrecks: Unknown date 1753
Ship	State	Description
Elizabeth & Hannah	Great Britain	The ship foundered in the Irish Sea 8 leagues (24 nautical miles (44 km)) off Liverpool, Lancashire.
Fortuna	Sweden	The ship was lost near Holyhead, Anglesey, Great Britain. She was on a voyage from Gothenburg to Dublin, Ireland.
Llandovery	Great Britain	The ship foundered in the English Channel 2 leagues (6 nautical miles (11 km)) off Boulogne, France. She was on a voyage from Jamaica to London.
Patsey	Great Britain	The ship was run down and sunk in the Strait of Dover by a Dutch vessel. Her crew survived. She was on a voyage from London to Barcelona, Spain.
Thomas	Ireland	The ship was lost near Holyhead. She was on a voyage from Málaga, Spain, to Dublin.
Two Brothers	Great Britain	The ship foundered in the English Channel off Folkestone, Kent.

== Unknown date ==
List of shipwrecks: Unknown date 1753
Ship	State	Description
Benjamin	Great Britain	The snow foundered whilst on a voyage from South Carolina, British America, to Barbados. Her crew were rescued.
Betsey	Great Britain	The ship foundered whilst on a voyage from Barbados to South Carolina.
Dagenham	Great Britain	The ship was lost at the mouth of the Tiber with the loss of her captain. She was on a voyage from London and Falmouth, Cornwall, to Civitavecchia and Naples.
Dispatch	Great Britain	The ship was driven ashore on the coast of Jamaica before 30 March.
Flower of Cork	Ireland	The ship foundered in the Atlantic Ocean 5 leagues (15 nautical miles (28 km)) off the Virginia Capes, British America. Her crew were rescued. She was on a voyage from Cork to Virginia.
Hereford		The ship was driven ashore on the coast of South Carolina. She was on a voyage from South Carolina to Bristol, Gloucestershire. She was later refloated and departed in early March.
Katherine and Anne	Great Britain	The ship foundered in the Mediterranean Sea off Naples, Kingdom of Sicily, before 13 February. Her crew survived. She was on a voyage from Trani, Kingdom of Sicily, to Lisbon, Portugal.
Lucy	(Kingdom of Great Britain) British America	The ship was lost off the Virginia Capes before 27 March. She was on a voyage from Marland, Oklahoma, to Lisbon, Portugal.
Arkhangel Mikhail (Архангел Михаил, 'Archangel Michael')	Imperial Russian Navy	The brigantine was wrecked at the shores of Kamchatka. She was on a voyage from Okhotsk to Gizhiga.
Nostra Señora del Rosario	Spain	The ship was lost in the River Plate. Her crew were rescued. She was on a voyage from Cádiz to Buenos Aires, Viceroyalty of Peru.
Sussex	Great Britain	The ship was lost off the Virginia Capes, British America, before 25 September. Her crew were rescued. She was on a voyage from North Carolina to Philadelphia, Pennsylvania, British America.
Swan	Great Britain	The ship was destroyed by fire at a port in Maryland, British America.
Swedish Lyon	Hamburg	The ship was driven ashore and wrecked near Viareggio, Grand Duchy of Tuscany, before 27 February. She was on a voyage from Hamburg to Livorno, Grand Duchy of Tuscany.
Swift	Great Britain	The ship foundered before 27 March. She was on a voyage from Livorno, Grand Duchy of Tuscany, to Amsterdam, North Holland, Dutch Republic.
