= The Gorlo =

- Strait
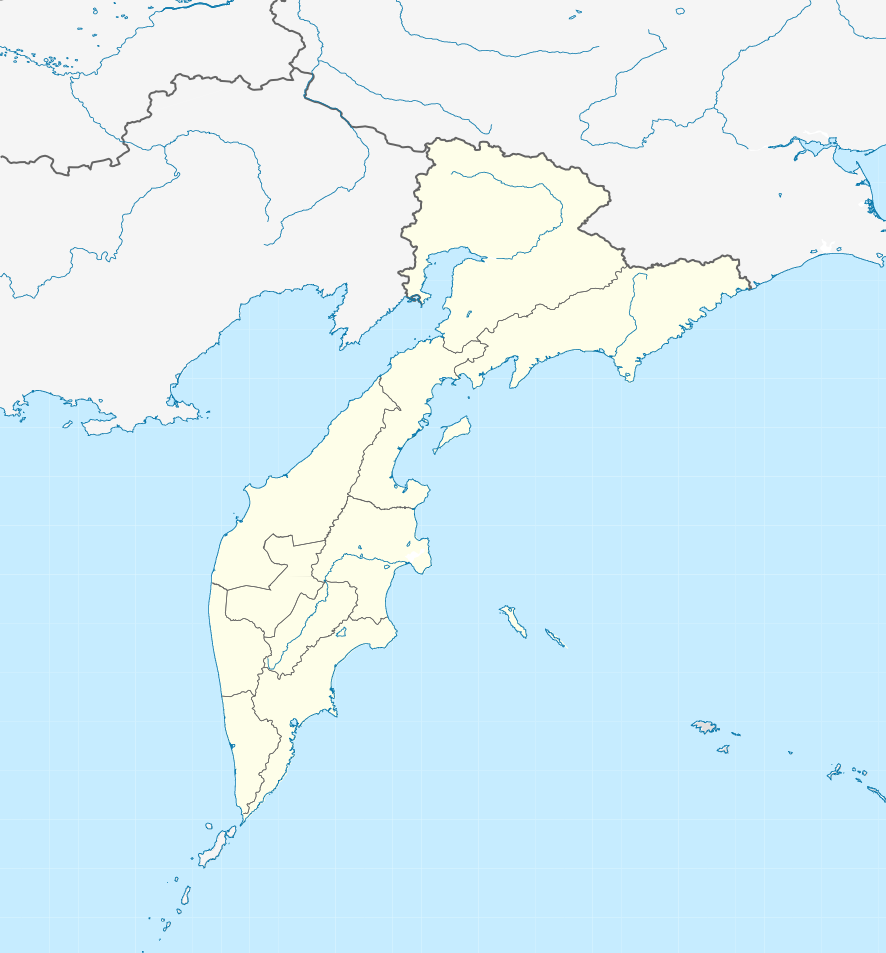
- Location within Kamchatka Krai
- Coordinates: 61°34′N 163°28′E
- Country: Russian Federation
- Federal subject: Kamchatka Krai

The Gorlo (Russian: Горло), the narrowest part of Penzhina Bay, separates it into two parts. Its northwestern and northeastern points are Capes Opasnyy and Mamet and its southwestern and southeastern points are Capes Yelistratova (61° 31' N, 163° 02' E) and Vodopadnyy (61° 25' N, 163° 46' E), respectively. Tidal currents in The Gorlo reach 4.7 to 5 knots.

Administratively The Gorlo belongs to the Kamchatka Krai of the Russian Federation.

== History ==
American whaleships hunted bowhead whales in The Gorlo from 1860 to 1889. They called it the Narrows. Ships drifted through The Gorlo on fair tides and anchored during head tides. They also traded with the native Koryaks for salmon trout.
