= Gizhiga (river) =

Gizhiga Гижига / Вуйвов’эем
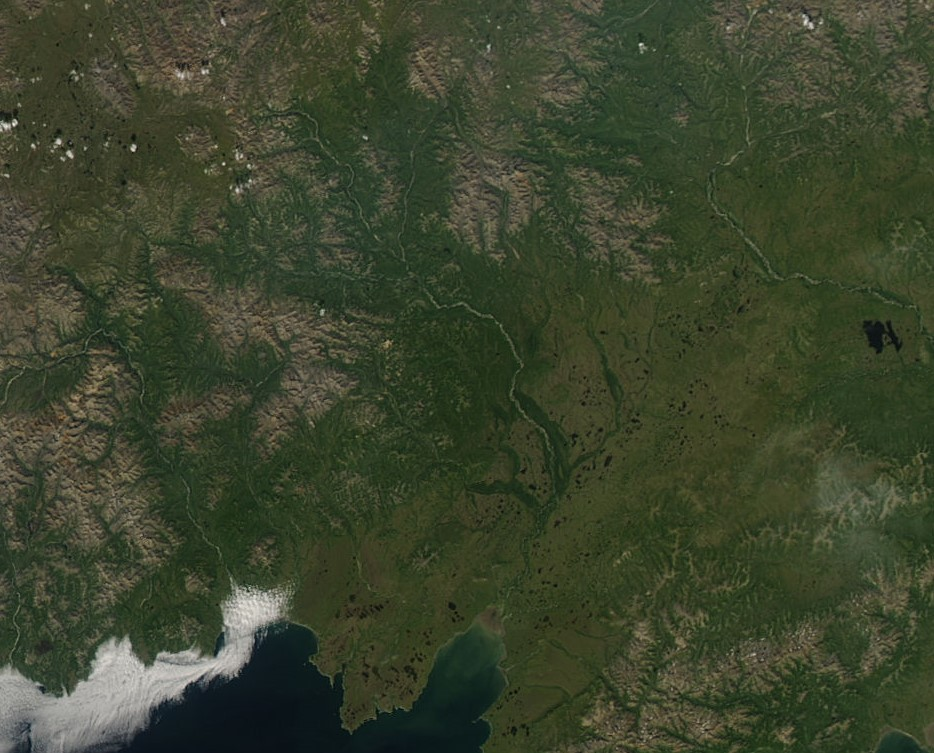
- NASA image of the Gizhiga river basin

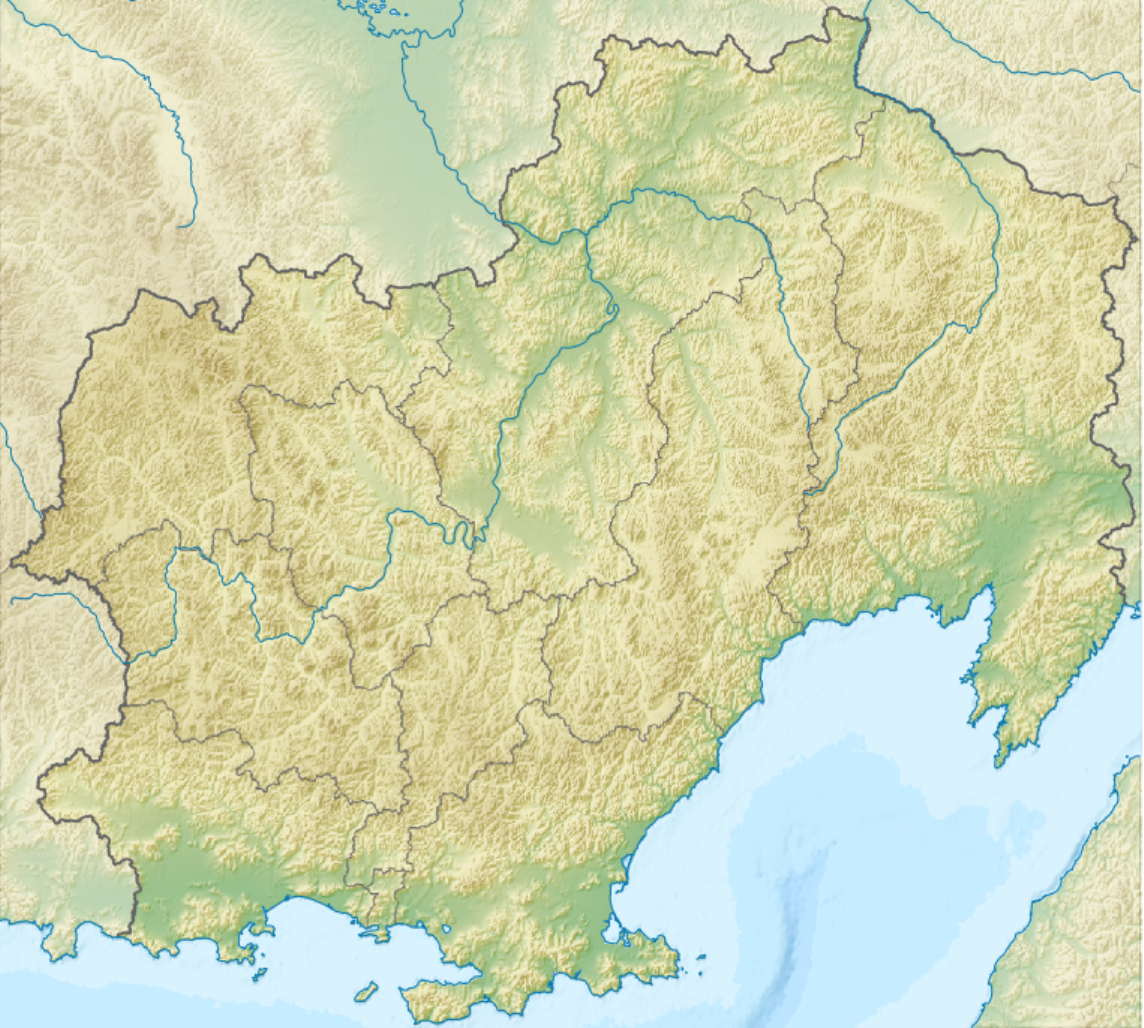
- Mouth location in Magadan Oblast, Russia

Location
- Country: Russia
- Federal subject: Magadan Oblast
- District: Severo-Evensky District

Physical characteristics
- Source
  - location: Korbendya Range; Kolyma Mountains
  - coordinates: 62°52′39″N 158°45′09″E
  - elevation: ca 1,000 m (3,300 ft)
- Mouth: Sea of Okhotsk
  - location: Gizhiga Bay
  - coordinates: 61°58′07″N 160°24′29″E
  - elevation: 0 m (0 ft)
- Length: 221 km (137 mi)
- Basin size: 11,900 km^{2} (4,600 sq mi)
- Discharge
  - average: 151.8 m^{3}/s (5,360 cu ft/s)

The Gizhiga (Russian: Гижига; Koryak: Вуйвов’эем (Vuyvov'eyem)) is a river in Magadan Oblast, Russian Far East. It is 221 kilometres (137 mi) long, with a drainage basin of 11,900 square kilometres (4,600 mi^{2}).

The name of the river probably originated in the Chukchi "Ḳtig" (Ӄитиг), meaning "frost" or "cold wind". In Koryak it is known as "Vuyvov'eyem" (Вуйвов’эем), meaning "fortress river".

== Course ==
The Gizhiga has its source in the Korbendya Range of the eastern Kolyma Mountains. It flows in a roughly eastern direction about half its course. Then it bends first southeastwards, and then southwestwards in its last stretch, within a floodplain where it divides into multiple sleeves and where there are many small thermokarst lakes. Finally it flows by Gizhiga village into the Gizhigin Bay, at the northern end of Shelikhov Gulf, Sea of Okhotsk.

The main tributaries of the Gizhiga are the 65 kilometres (40 mi) long Akhaveyem, the 157 kilometres (98 mi) long Chyornaya and the 63 kilometres (39 mi) long Irbichan from the left and the 104 kilometres (65 mi) long Turomcha from the right.

== Flora and fauna ==
The main fish species in the Gizhiga river include grayling, pike and Eurasian minnow. Chum salmon, pink salmon and coho salmon come into the river for spawning. Beluga whales are found in the estuary area of the river.

== See also ==
- List of rivers of Russia
