= Yama (river) =

Yama Яма
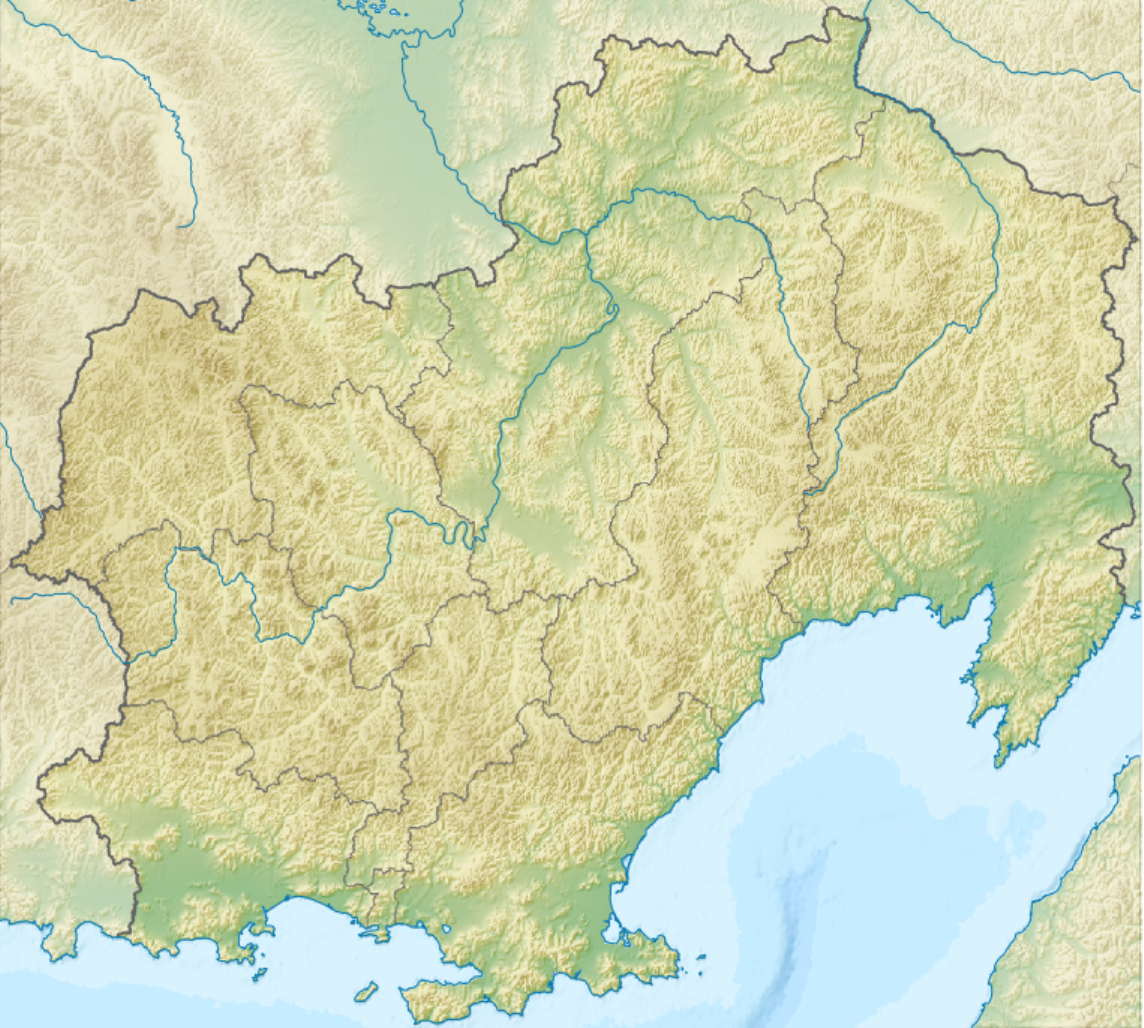
- Mouth location in Magadan Oblast, Russia

Location
- Country: Russia
- Federal subject: Magadan Oblast
- District: Khasynsky District; Olsky District

Physical characteristics
- Source
  - location: Maymandzhin Range
  - coordinates: 60°42′48″N 151°53′56″E
  - elevation: 750 m (2,460 ft)
- Mouth: Sea of Okhotsk
  - location: Perevolochny; Yama Bay
  - coordinates: 59°36′48″N 154°12′38″E
  - elevation: 0 m (0 ft)
- Length: 285 km (177 mi)
- Basin size: 12,500 km^{2} (4,800 sq mi)

The Yama (Russian: Яма) is a river in Magadan Oblast, Russian Far East. It is 285 kilometres (177 mi) long, with a drainage basin of 12,500 square kilometres (4,800 mi^{2}).

The R504 Kolyma Highway passes just west of the sources of the Yama. The name of the river is probably of Koryak origin.

== Course ==
The Yama has its source in the southwestern slopes of the Maymandzhin Range, at the confluence of rivers Maimandzha and Maimachan, near Atka and not far from the sources of north-heading Maltan. It flows in a roughly southeastern direction along its entire course. The last stretch of the Yama is in a marshy coastal area where it divides into multiple sleeves and where there are many small thermokarst lakes on the right bank. Finally it flows by Yamsk village into the Perevolochny estuary, separated by a landspit from Yam Bay, at the southwest end of the Shelikhov Gulf, Sea of Okhotsk.

The main tributaries of the Yama are the 63 kilometres (39 mi) long Tob, the 60 kilometres (37 mi) long Alut and the 76 kilometres (47 mi) long Khalanchiga from the right.

== Flora and fauna ==
Salix arbutifolia (syn. Chosenia arbutifolia) trees grow in the Yama floodplain by the banks of the river.

The Yama river is a spawning ground for salmon species, including chum salmon, pink salmon and coho salmon. Arctic char, whitespotted char, dolly varden and grayling are also found in the river.

== In popular culture ==
In the fishing simulator game Russian Fishing 4, Yama river is a major fishing map for spin fishing.

== See also ==
- List of rivers of Russia
