= Gizhiga =

Gizhiga Ги́жига
- Settlement
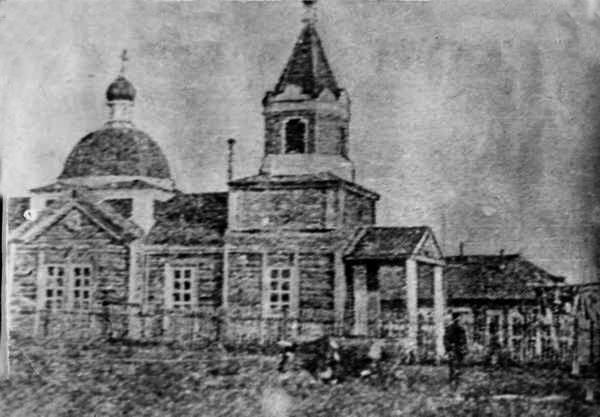
- A church in Gizhiga

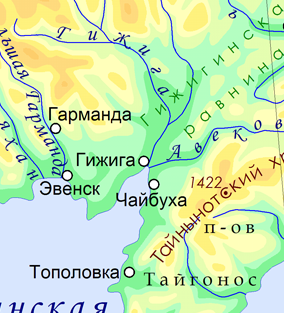
- Gizhiga is in the center
- Coordinates: 62°03′N 160°30′E
- Country: Russia
- Region: Magadan Oblast
- District: Srednekansky District
- Elevation: 1 m (3.3 ft)

Population (2021)
  - Total: 98
- Time zone: UTC+11:00
- Postal code: 686442
- Area code: +7 41348

Gizhiga (Russian: Гижига) is a rural locality (a selo) in Severo-Evensky District of Magadan Oblast, Russia, located at the head of Gizhigin Bay of the Sea of Okhotsk, on the right bank of the Gizhiga just upstream from its mouth where there is a poor but usable harbor. Population: 288 (2012 est.).

== History ==
Gizhiga was an important place in the first half of the 19th century. It was founded in 1752 along with Tigilsky to protect the land route from Okhotsk to the Kamchatka Peninsula from the rebellious Koryaks whose hostility had blocked the route since 1743. Gizhiga and Tigilsky were the only two places on the Sea of Okhotsk to have the status of a krepost (fortress). No grain was grown but there were a few vegetable gardens. People ate mostly fish. Sled dogs were used and a team of dogs ate as much fish as twenty men. About 63–108 tons of grain were imported from Okhotsk annually. Prices were about twice as high as in Okhotsk. The ships returned with mostly furs. When Kennan was there in 1866, Gizhiga dominated the trade in the area between Okhotsk and Anadyrsk. There were fifty or sixty log houses, a governor, and four or five merchants. It was visited annually by a government supply steamer and by American merchant vessels.

== Demographics ==
Population development
Year	Population
1755	69
1766	189
1776	500–600
1803	770–773
1813	900
1816	696
