= Takhtoyamsk =

Takhtoyamsk Тахтоямск
- Village
- Location in Russia Takhtoyamsk (Russia)
- Coordinates: 60°11′49″N 154°40′54″E
- Country: Russia
- Federal subject: Magadan Oblast
- District: Olsky

Area
  - Total: 0.761 km^{2} (0.294 sq mi)
- Elevation: 10 m (33 ft)

Population (2018)
  - Total: 289
  - Density: 380/km^{2} (984/sq mi)
- Time zone: UTC+11 (MAGT)
- Postal code: 685922

Takhtoyamsk (Russian: Тахтоямск) is a village in Magadan Oblast, Russia with a subarctic climate Köppen climate classification. Before 1924, Takhtoyamsk was a remote settlement mostly populated by Evenk reindeer hunters and fishers. Although census data for Takhtoyamsk dates back to 1924, the population of Takhtoyamsk has decreased from 382 in 2002 to 289 in 2018; consisting of Evenks and Russians. In 1959, during the Soviet occupation of Russia, a power station and nursery were built along with residential buildings becoming industrialized and commercialized into shops and factories. However, no roads were built to connect Takhtoyamsk with the outside world, therefore transportation was agreed to be arranged via Takhtoyamsk's airfield, sending flights directly to Magadan every two weeks.
