= Yam Islands =

Yam Islands Ямские острова
- Island group
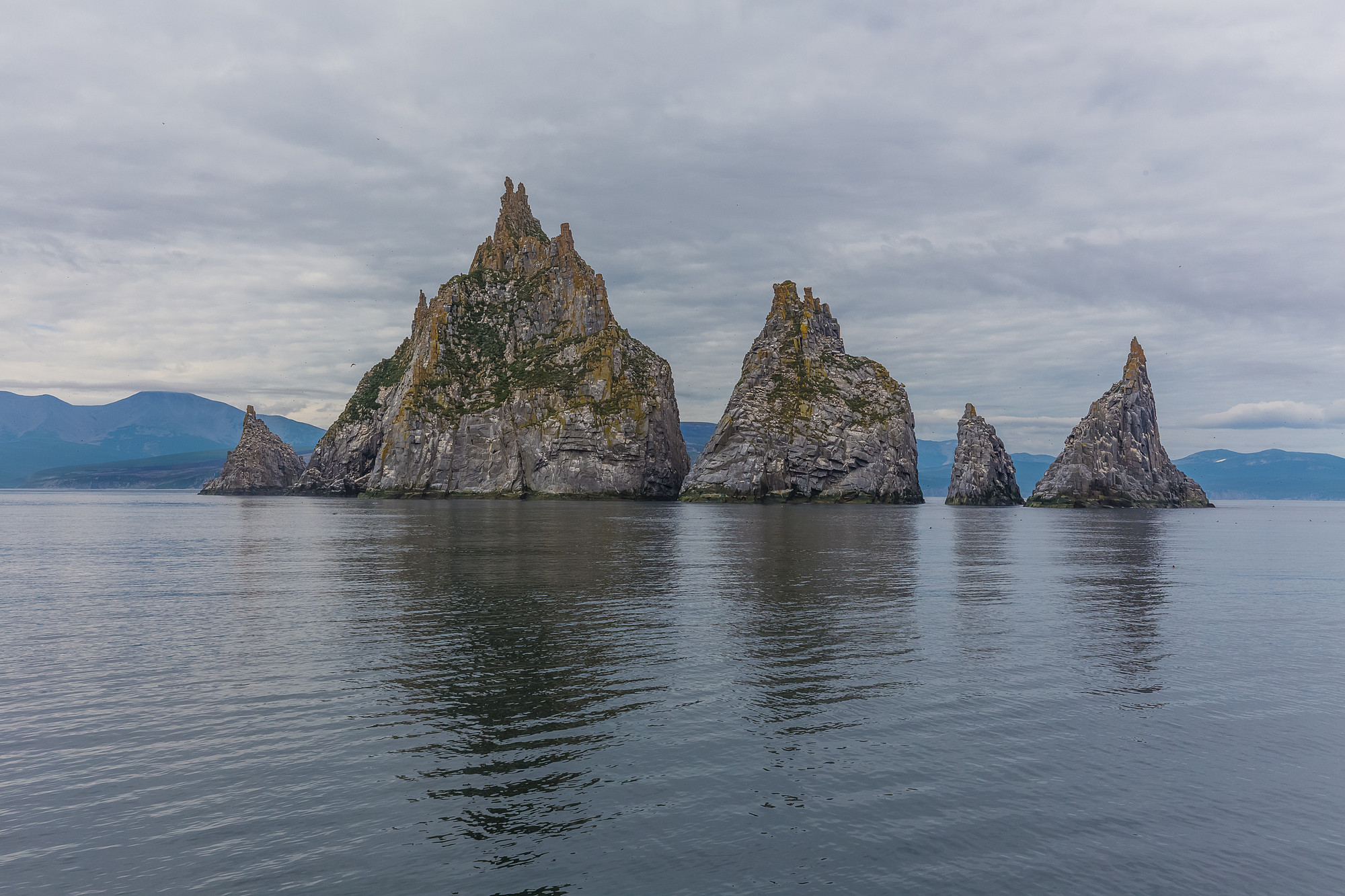
- Khatemalyu Island.

- Location within Magadan Oblast
- Coordinates: 59°15′N 155°29′E
- Country: Russian Federation
- Federal subject: Far Eastern Federal District
- Oblast: Magadan Oblast
- Elevation: 700 m (2,300 ft)

The Yam Islands, Yamsky Islands or Yamskiye Islands (Ямские острова; Yamskiye Ostrova), is a small island group located close to the coast in the northern Sea of Okhotsk. Administratively the Yam Islands belong to the Magadan Oblast of the Russian Federation.

== Geography ==
The Yam island group lies about 250 km east of Magadan, only 10 km from the shores of the Pyagin Peninsula (Poluostrov P'yagina).

=== Islands ===
The main island is Matykil Island (Остров Матыкиль). It is 6 km long and has a width of 2.2 km. All the other islands are much smaller. The highest point in Matykil is 700 m.

The other islands of the group are: Atykan (Остров Атыкан), Baran (Остров Баран), Khatemalyu (Остров Хатемалью) and Kokontse (Остров Коконце).

== History ==
Between 1852 and 1874, American whaleships cruised around the islands for bowhead whales.

== Fauna ==
Steller sea lions occur on the islands, while in the spring and summer millions of seabirds nest on the islands, including roughly six million least auklet (possibly the largest colony in the world), over 900,000 northern fulmar, and tens of thousands of parakeet auklet; crested auklet also nest on the islands.

These islands are part of the Magandskiy Zapovednik or protected bioregion of the Magadan area.
