= Trety Island =

Trety Island Остров Третий
- Island
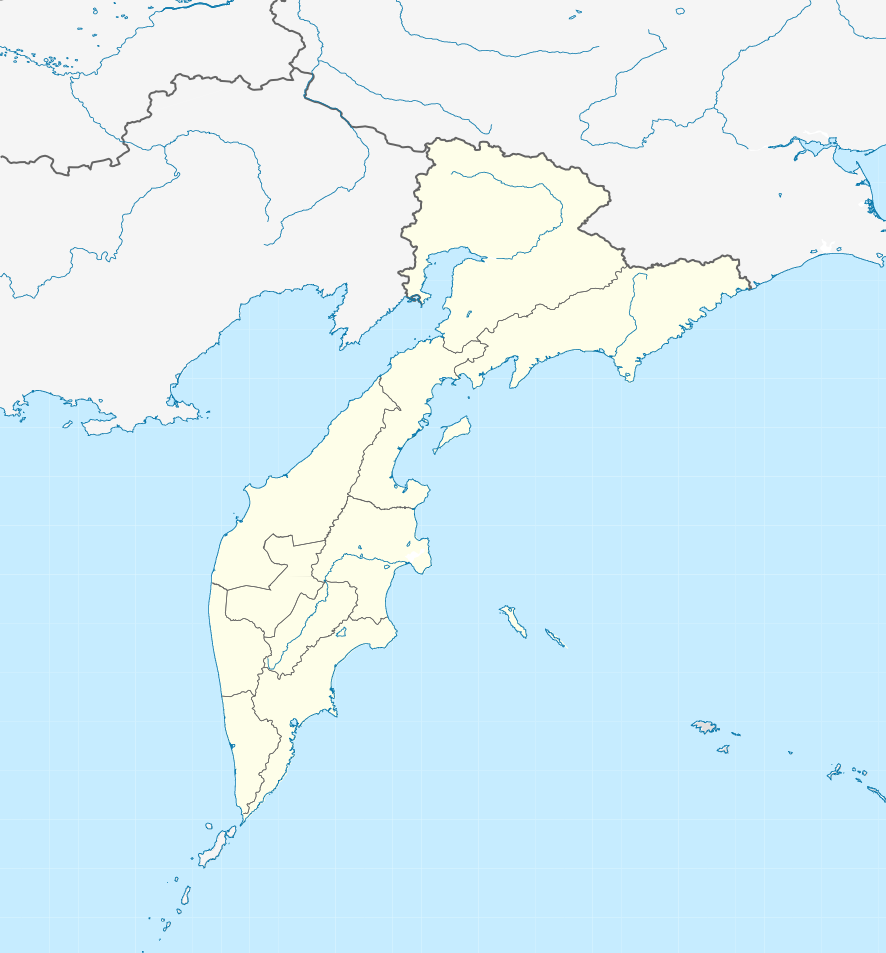
- Location within Kamchatka Krai
- Coordinates: 61°34′N 162°34′E
- Country: Russian Federation
- Federal subject: Kamchatka Krai

Trety Island or Treti Island (Остров Третий; Ostrov Trety, literally: The Third Island) is a relatively large island in the western shores of the Shelikhov Bay, at the northern end of the Sea of Okhotsk. It is located 4 km to the south of a peninsula that encloses a small bay in an area that is largely uninhabited.

== Geography ==
Trety Island is roughly triangular in shape. It is 8 km long and has a maximum width of 3.7 km.

2.3 km north of Trety, in the sound that separates it from the mainland shore, lies an islet only 700 m long and 400 m wide.

- Vtoroy 61°28′N 163°00′E and Krayny (Остров Крайний) 61°27′N 163°00′E, or Chemenvytegartynup (Чеменвытегартынуп), a group of two smaller islands, lies about 30 km to the southeast of Trety. Krayny is the larger of the two and they are separated from each other by a 1.7 km wide sound.

Administratively Trety Island belongs to the Kamchatka Krai of the Russian Federation.

== History ==
American whaleships cruised off Trety, Vtoroy and Krayny Islands for bowhead whales from 1863 to 1889. They called them the Grampus Islands. Trety was called Square Grampus or Big Grampus Island. On 11 August 1867, the barque Stella (270 tons), of New Bedford, Capt. Ebenezer F. Nye, was wrecked on Trety. Two men were killed as the barque was smashed to pieces. The rest of the crew were rescued by several nearby vessels.
