= Gizhigin Bay =

Bay of the Sea of Okhotsk, Russia

- Гижигинская губа
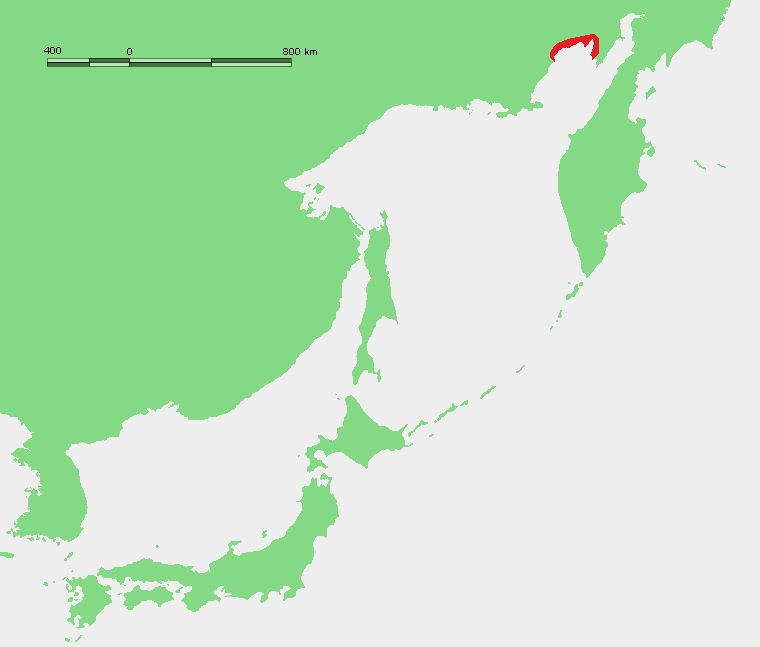
- Location in the Sea of Okhotsk

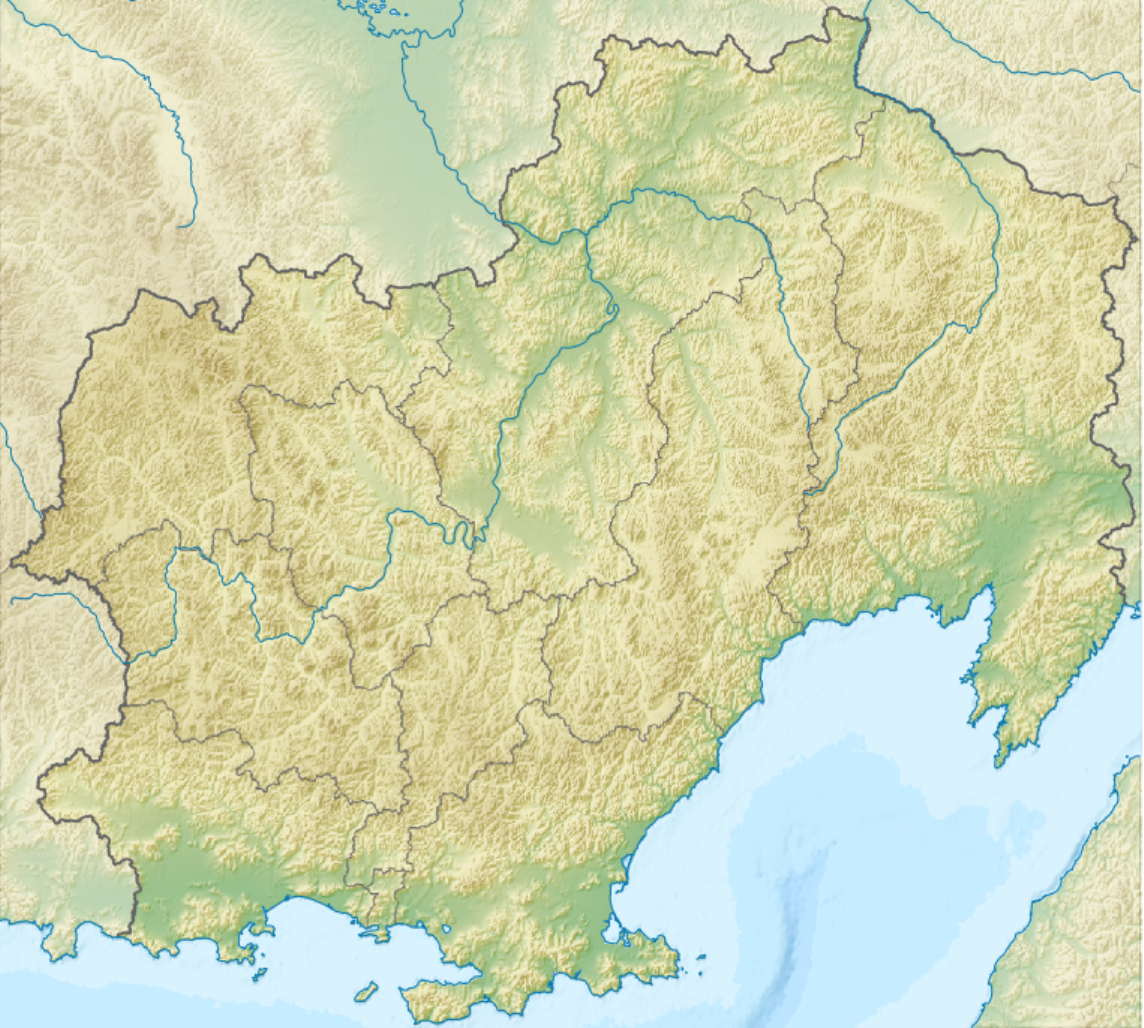
- Location in Magadan Oblast
- Location: Severo-Evensky District
- Coordinates: 61°15′N 158°25′E
- River sources: Gizhiga
- Ocean/sea sources: Sea of Okhotsk
- Basin countries: Russia
- Settlements: Evensk, Gizhiga

Gizhigin Bay (Russian: Гижигинская губа, Gizhiginskaya Guba) is a wide bay northwest of Kamchatka, Russia. It is the northwestern arm of Shelikhov Bay in the northeast corner of the Sea of Okhotsk. The settlements of Evensk and Gizhiga are located at the head of the bay.

== Geography and climate ==
Gizhigin Bay is entered between Cape Aregichinsky (60°30' N, 155°27' E) and Cape Taygonos (60°34' N, 160°11' E). The Taygonos Peninsula separates it from Penzhina Bay to the east. It is about 260 km (about 160 mi) west to east by 148 km (about 92 mi) north to south and has a maximum depth of 88 m (about 289 ft). The coast is steep and rocky and there are no completely safe anchorages within the bay. 221 km (137 mi) long river Gizhiga flows into the head of the bay.

Spring tides rise 6.7 m (22 ft) at the entrance of the bay and 7.9 m (26 ft) at its head, while neaps rise 2.7 to 3.3 m (8.9 to 10.8 ft). The flood current sets to the north, while the ebb flows to the south. During spring tides these currents may reach up to 2.5 knots near Cape Taygonos. During the season of navigation the southeast part of the bay experiences dense fogs, with May and June being the foggiest months; in August, however, fog is rare. South winds are prevalent in the summer, while north winds are frequent in the fall and the first part of winter. Storms are common from the second half of September to November. In the winter, northwest winds prevail, which are interrupted by blizzards from the northeast. Gentle winds and calms occur in April and May.

== History ==
American whaleships hunted bowhead and gray whales in the bay from the 1860s to 1900. Some traded with the natives.

== Fauna ==
Pacific herring are common and in the spring and summer there are a number of large colonies of common murre in the bay. In the spring and summer beluga whales aggregate in the bays and estuaries at the head of the bay to feed on spawning herring, smelt, and salmon. In the spring bowhead whales can also be seen in the bay.
