= Penzhina Bay =

- Пе́нжинская губа́
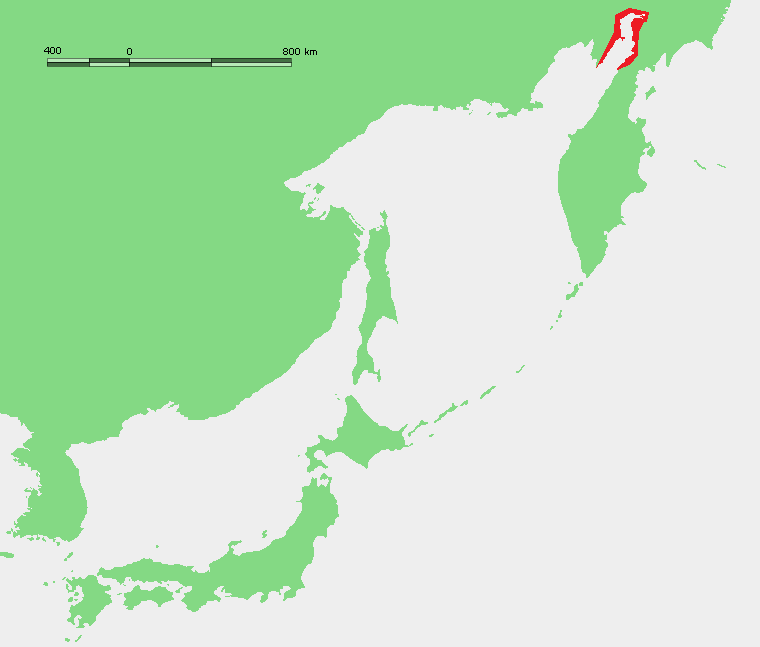
- Location of Penzhin Bay in the Sea of Okhotsk
- Interactive map of Penzhina Bay
- Location: North Asia
- Coordinates: 61°12′N 163°00′E
- Type: Bay
- Primary inflows: Penzhina river
- Primary outflows: Shelikhov Gulf
- Basin countries: Russia
- Max. length: 300 km (190 mi)
- Max. depth: 62 m (203 ft)

Penzhina Bay (Russian: Пе́нжинская губа́, Penzhinskaya guba) is a long and narrow bay off the northwestern coast of Kamchatka, Russia. The bay has one of the strongest tides in the world, which prompted several power station proposals.

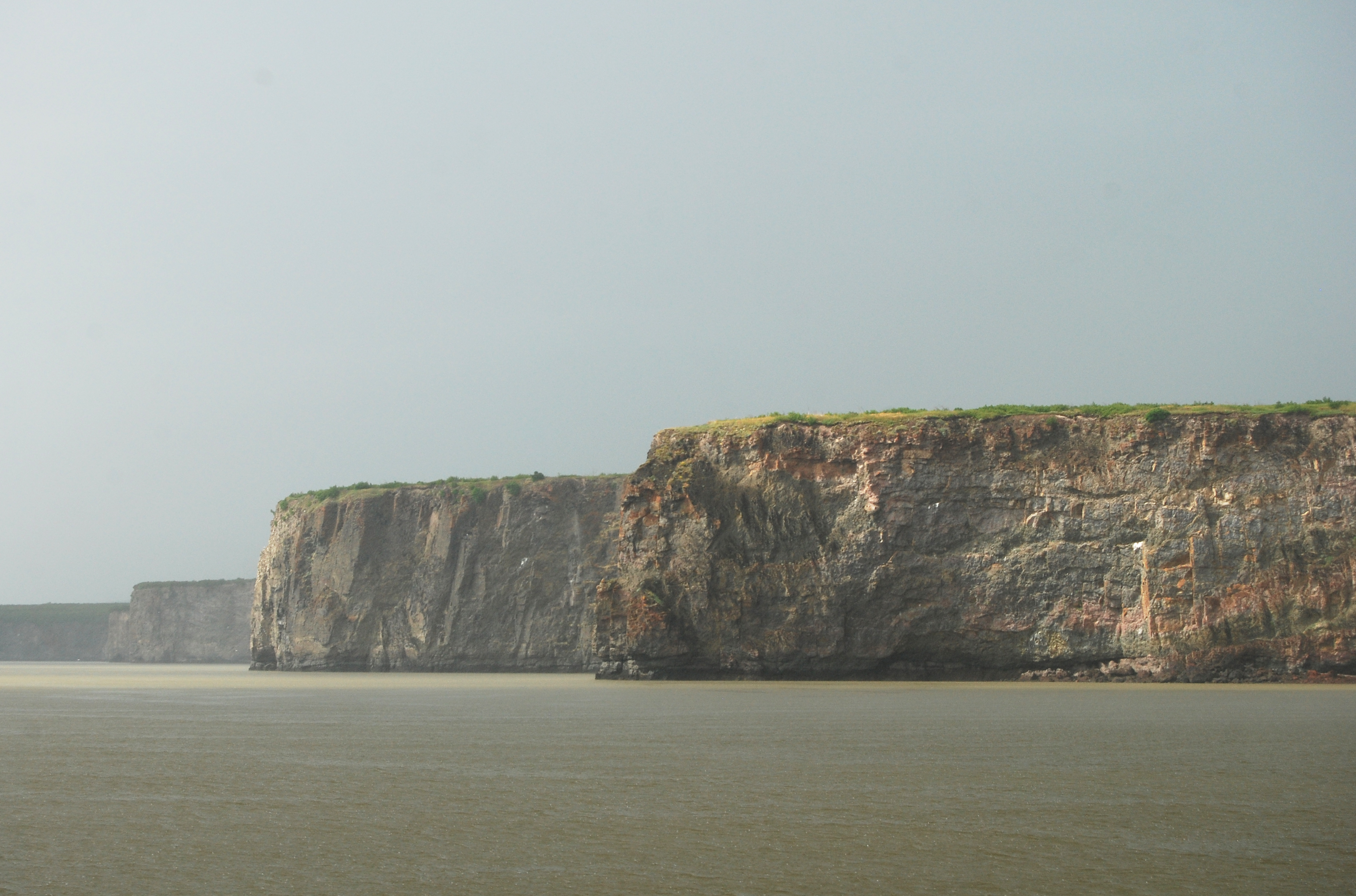
Penzhina Bay

== Geography ==
Penzhina Bay is the upper right arm of Shelikhov Bay in the northeastern corner of the Sea of Okhotsk. It is bounded on the east by the Kamchatka Peninsula and on the west by the Taygonos Peninsula, which separates it from Gizhigin Bay. The bay is entered between Cape Taygonos (60°34' N, 160°11' E) to the west and Cape Bozhedomova (60°18' N, 161°53' E) to the east. Cape Povorotnyy lies to the east-northeast of Cape Taygonos. It is about 300 km (186 mi) long and 65 km (40 mi) wide. Near its middle, two peninsulas narrow it to 30 km (18.6 mi), forming The Gorlo. There is ice in the bay from October to May. It has the highest tides of any bay on the Pacific Ocean: 9 m (29.5 ft), 12.9 m (42.3 ft) maximum, versus 17 m (56 ft) in the Bay of Fundy. Its basin is very thinly populated.

The river Penzhina flows into the head of the bay. It is 713 km (443 mi) long and flows east, then south, then southwest to reach the bay.

== History ==
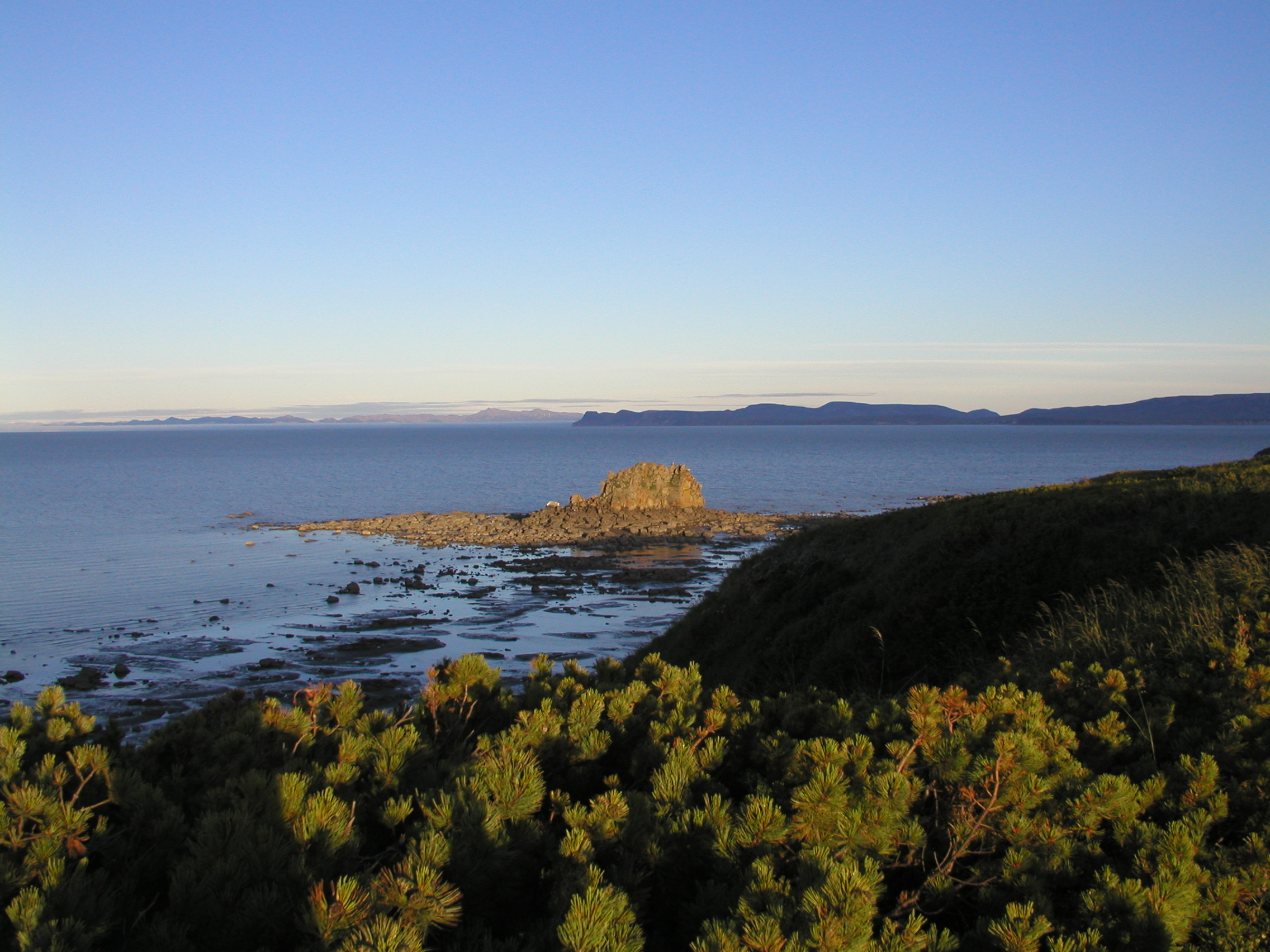
The rugged coast of the bay.

The town of Penzhina was located on the middle Penzhina River and was visited by George Kennan in 1866. The major tributary of the Penzhina is the Aklan, Oklan or Khayakha River which flows southeast and joins the Penzhina about 50 miles from its mouth.

In 1669 the Russians built the ostrog of Aklansk, which was used to subdue the local Koryaks and was an important base on the route south from Anadyrsk to the Kamchatka peninsula before the sea route from Okhotsk opened up. It was attacked by the Koryaks several times and later abandoned.

Between 1849 and 1900, American whaleships hunted bowhead whales in the bay. On 11 August 1867, the barque Stella (270 tons), of New Bedford, Capt. Ebenezer F. Nye, was wrecked on Krayny on the western side of the bay. Two men were killed as the barque was smashed to pieces. The rest of the crew were rescued by several nearby vessels.

During a five-day period in late September 1968, the Soviet factory ship Vladivostok and its fleet of whale catchers illegally caught sixty-six balaenids (likely bowheads) in the bay.

== Hydrological potential of the bay ==
Three types of tides. The tides of Shelikhov Bay are of the diurnal type.

The tides in the Penzhin Bay of the Sea of Okhotsk are the highest for the Pacific Ocean, reaching a height of 13.4 metres (44 ft). The tides in Shelikhov Bay are of the diurnal type. The area of Penzhin Bay basin is 20,530 km^{2}. Given that the average magnitude of tide is equal to 10 metres (33 ft), this gives the diurnal flow of water in the bay as 410.6 cubic kilometres (98.5 cu mi) or average discharge 4.75×10^{6} m^{3}•s^{−1}.

The passing stream has its own potential energy, which in the gravity field of Earth is above zero only in the case of non-zero head of water ($H_{Head}$) and can be expressed as follows:

$E = [\rho_{sw} \cdot S_{Basin} \cdot (H_{Tide} - H_{Head})] \cdot g \cdot H_{Head}$, (1)

where $E$ denotes potential energy; $\rho_{sw}$ — density of sea water, equal to 1,027 kg/m^{3}; $S_{Basin}$ — area of basin; $H_{Tide}$ — height of the tide and $g$ — gravitational acceleration, set to 9.81 m/s^{2}. The part of the expression in brackets denotes terms defining the mass of water passing through the basin daily.

As can be seen in formula (1), the potential energy becomes zero in the case of zero head of water and in the case of equal heights of head and tide. If considering this formula as a function of head level ($H_{Head}$), it has a form of parabolic dependence, with its maximum at $H_{Tide}$ = 2•$H_{Head}$ or at $H_{Head} = 5$ m. This value of $H_{Head}$ gives two times lower height of tide in the bay and twice smaller average discharge of water — 5 m and 2.38×10^{6} m^{3}•s^{−1} (205.3 km^{3}/day), correspondingly.

The substitution of obtained parameters into (1) and dividing it by the day length in seconds gives the average capacity 120 GW. The latter one yields 1,054 TW•h or 3.79×10^{18} Joules of energy annually. Depending on the efficiency of conversion of potential energy into electricity, the total quantity of electricity and electric capacity will have somewhat lower values. If one assumes an efficiency of conversion of 96%, this gives an average electric capacity of 115 GW and an available amount of electricity of 1,012 TW•h or 3.64×10^{18} J per year.
