= Shelikhov Gulf =

Bay of the Sea of Okhotsk

- залив Шелихова
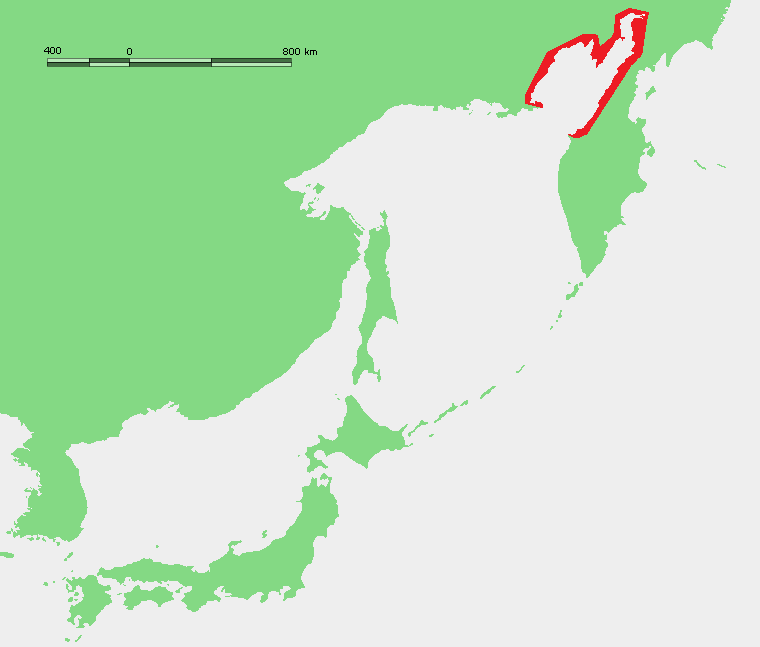
- Location of the Shelikhov Gulf in the Sea of Okhotsk
- Interactive map of Shelikhov Gulf
- Location: North Asia
- Coordinates: 60°N 158°E
- Type: Gulf
- Primary inflows: Gizhiga river, Penzhina river, Yama river, Malkachan river, Palana river
- Primary outflows: Sea of Okhotsk
- Basin countries: Russia
- Surface area: 130,000 km^{2} (50,000 sq mi)
- Max. depth: 350 m (1,150 ft)

Shelikhov Gulf (Russian: залив Шелихова) is a large gulf off the northwestern coast of Kamchatka, Russia. The gulf is named after Russian explorer Grigory Shelikhov.

It is located in the northeastern corner of the Sea of Okhotsk and branches into two main arms, Gizhigin Bay to the west and Penzhina Bay to the east. Its southwest corner is formed by the P'yagin Peninsula, Yam Bay, and the Yamsky Islands.

The Shelikhov Gulf should not be confused with much smaller Shelikhov Bay (Bukhta Shelikhova, 50.3764N, 155.62E), which is also in the Sea of Okhotsk on the northwestern coast of Paramushir Island.

== History ==
Shelikhov Gulf was frequented by American whaleships hunting bowhead and gray whales between 1849 and 1900. They called it Northeast Gulf. They also traded with the natives for fish and reindeer. On 11 August 1867, the barque Stella (270 tons), of New Bedford, captained by Ebenezer F. Nye, was wrecked on Krayny in the northeastern arm of the gulf. Two men were killed as the barque was smashed to pieces on the rocks. The rest of the crew were split among several vessels.

== Wildlife ==
In the spring and summer, beluga whales aggregate in the bays and estuaries at the head of Shelikhov Gulf to feed on spawning herring, smelt, and salmon. In the spring, bowhead whales can also be seen in the gulf.
