= Aklan (disambiguation) =

Aklan may refer to three things in the Philippines:

- Aklan Province
- Aklan languages
- Aklan River

Aklan may also refer to places on Kamchatka

- Aklan, an older name for the river Oklan, a tributary of the Penzhina
- the ancient Russian fort Aklansk near the river Oklan
- a bay and a mountain near the river Oklan

== See also ==
- Aklanon (disambiguation)
