= Belaya (Penzhina) =

Belaya Белая Эссовеем — Пальматкина
- Mouth location in Kamchatka Krai

Location
- Country: Russia
- Federal subject: Kamchatka Krai
- District: Penzhinsky District

Physical characteristics
- Source
  - location: Vaeg Range; Koryak Highlands
  - coordinates: 62°46′13″N 169°32′25″E
- Mouth: Penzhina
  - coordinates: 62°29′52″N 166°20′07″E
- Length: 304 km (189 mi)
- Basin size: 13,800 km^{2} (5,300 sq mi)
- Discharge
  - average: 138 m^{3}/s (4,900 cu ft/s)

Basin features
- Progression: Penzhina → Sea of Okhotsk

The Belaya (Russian: Белая) is a river in Kamchatka Krai, Russia. The length of the river is 304 kilometres (189 mi) and the area of is drainage basin 13,800 square kilometres (5,300 mi^{2}). It is the most important tributary of the Penzhina, followed by the Oklan.

== Course ==
The Belaya has its source as the Palmatkina in the western slopes of the Vaeg Range, in the center of the Koryak Highlands. It is joined by the Essoveyem from the left and flows roughly southwestwards skirting the southeastern limits of the Penzhina Range, draining the Parapolsky Dol, a plain between both ranges. It approaches the Penzhina in a swampy floodplain with numerous small lakes. Finally it meets the left bank of the Penzhina upstream from Kamenskoye.

The river is fed by snow and rain. It freezes between mid October and mid May. The largest tributaries are the Vetvistaya from the right, and the Khonteklyakkuul, Umkavylkuul, Imlan, Kuyuln, Tundrovaya, Essoveem (Evytkenveem), Gaychaveem (Ilgilkhivayam) and Bolshoy Upupkin from the left. There are 4,844 lakes in the river basin with a total area of 176 km^{2} (68 sq mi).

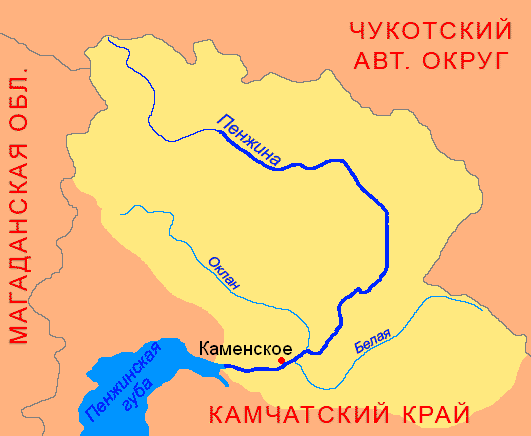
Basin of the Penzhina with its two main tributaries

== See also ==
- List of rivers of Russia
