= Ledyanaya =

Mountain in Kamchatka Krai, Russia

- Ледяная
- Location within Kamchatka Krai

Highest point
- Elevation: 2,562 m (8,406 ft)
- Coordinates: 61°53′18.60″N 171°10′12.72″E

Geography
- Location: Kamchatka Krai, Russian Far East
- Parent range: Ukelayat Range; Koryak Mountains; East Siberian Mountains

Climbing
- Easiest route: From Tilichiki

Ledyanaya (Russian: Ледяная, meaning "Icy"), is a peak in the Koryak Mountains. Administratively it is part of the Kamchatka Krai, Russian Federation.

This 2,562 m (8,406 ft) high mountain is the highest point of the Koryak Mountains. It is a rocky peak topped by an ice cap, part of the Ukelayat Range, in the Ukelayat river basin.

== See also ==
- List of mountains and hills of Russia
