= Far Eastern Krai =

Krai of a union republic of the Soviet Union

- January 4, 1926–October 21, 1938
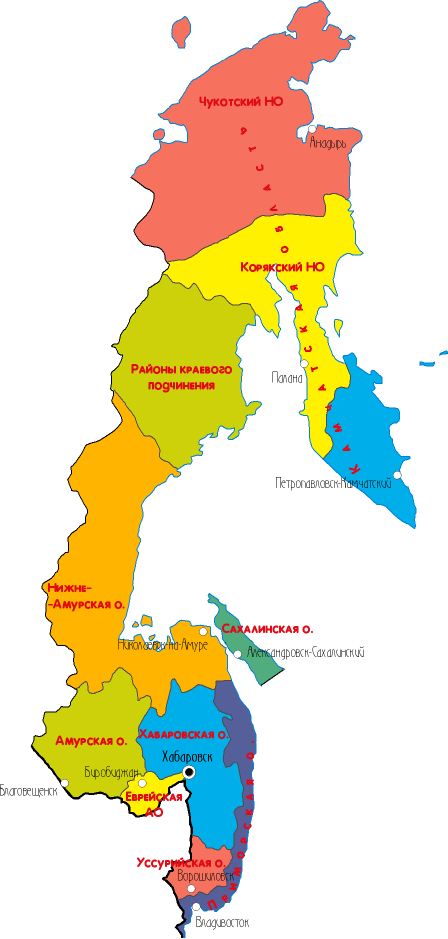
- The Far Eastern Krai in 1938
- Capital: Khabarovsk
- Area
- 2,602,600 km^{2} (1,004,900 sq mi)
- Population
  - 1926: 1,881,400
  - 1929: 2,099,700
- History
  - Established: 4 January 1926
  - Disestablished: 21 October 1938
| Preceded by | Succeeded by |
| Kamchatka Oblast (Russian Empire); Kamchatka Governorate | Kamchatka Oblast |
- Today part of: Amur Oblast, Jewish Autonomous Oblast, Kamchatka Krai, Magadan Oblast, Primorsky Krai, northern Sakhalin Oblast, Khabarovsk Krai, Chukotka Autonomous Okrug

Far Eastern Krai (Russian: Дальневосточный край, romanized: Dal'nevostochnyy kray) was a krai of the Russian Socialist Federative Soviet Republic of the Soviet Union from 1926 to 1938. Its capital was Khabarovsk. It was the largest administrative-territorial unit of the Soviet Union after the Yakut Autonomous Soviet Socialist Republic and the Kazakh Soviet Socialist Republic, occupying 12% of its territory. On October 21, 1938, the Far Eastern Krai was divided into Khabarovsk and Primorsky Krais.

The term may also informally refer to Russian Far East.

Far Eastern Avenue in St. Petersburg is named after the Far Eastern Krai. This is also partly because the street is located in the eastern part of the city.

== History ==
=== Far Eastern Oblast ===
After the abolition of the buffer state of Far Eastern Republic in November 15, 1922, the Far Eastern Oblast was established with capital Chita which included the lands of the Far Eastern Republic (as a territory ruled of Far Eastern revolutionary committee (Dal'revcom). It also had right of way by the Chinese Eastern Railway.

In May 1923, the Buryat-Mongol Autonomous Oblast was separated from the Far Eastern Oblast. On May 30, 1923, by merging with the Mongolian-Buryat Autonomous Oblast, the Buryat Autonomous Soviet Socialist Republic was formed.

In 1924, the capital was changed from Chita to Khabarovsk.

=== Far Eastern Krai ===
The Far Eastern Krai was formed by the decision of the All-Russian Central Executive Committee on January 4, 1926 on the site of the abolished Far Eastern Krai On October 21, 1938, as part of the Stalin-era policy of "unbundling", the Far Eastern Krai was divided into the Khabarovsk Krai and Primorsky Krai.

== Geography ==
From the north, the Far Eastern Territory was bordered by the Arctic Ocean, its East Siberian and Chukchi Seas, and from the east by the Pacific Ocean, the Bering Sea, the Sea of Okhotsk, and the Sea of Japan. On land the krai to the west bordered the Yakut Autonomous Soviet Socialist Republic and East Siberian Krai (since 1930), to the south bordered the possessions of Japan such as Korea and South Sakhalin, and on the northeast with the Alaska Territory through the sea border in the Bering Strait. In the south, along the Amur River and in what is now western Primorsky Krai, was the border with the Republic of China and, since 1931, the state of Manchukuo.

The largest peninsula in the krai was the Kamchatka Peninsula, and also included the much smaller Chukchi Peninsula. The territory of the Far Eastern Territory also included a number of large islands, including Wrangel Island, the northern part of Sakhalin, and two large archipelagos: the Commander Islands and Shantar Islands.

The Far Eastern Krai had a length of 28 degrees from south to north (from 42° to 70° N) and 83 degrees from west to east (from 108° E. D. to 169° W. D.). Geographically, its borders were based on the coasts of the Pacific and Arctic Oceans, on the one hand, and the watersheds of the rivers flowing into them, on the other. The geographic unity of the region was ensured by its maritime location, and the whole of its main territory was closely connected, first of all, with the Pacific Ocean. The scale of the Far Eastern Krai was such that from west to east there was a transition from the continental landscape of dry steppes of the Transbaikal to the island landscapes of Sakhalin, Kamchatka and the Commander Islands, and from north to south the ice of Wrangel Island, tundra, taiga and southern landscapes of what is now Primorsky Krai were successively replaced. The Far Eastern Krai had a very diverse ecosystem, including walruses, seals, reindeer, moose, camels, Siberian tigers, leopards, forest cats, river turtles, and whales.
