= Ichigem Range =

Mountain range in the Russian Far East

- Ичигемский Хребет
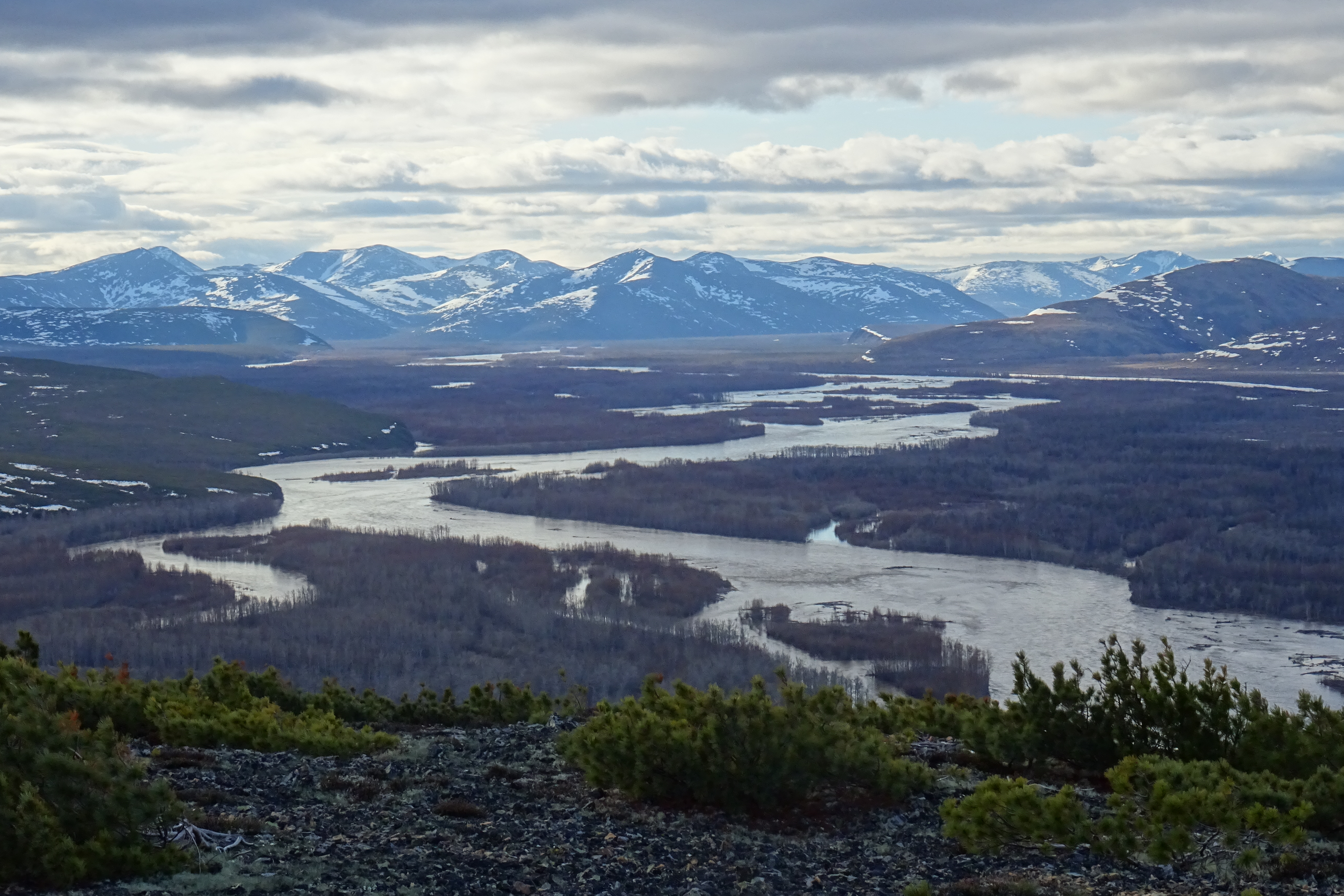
- View of the Penzhina with the Ichigem Range in the background

Highest point
- Peak: Unnamed
- Elevation: 1,465 m (4,806 ft)
- Coordinates: 63°18′31″N 165°33′54″E

Dimensions
- Length: 400 km (250 mi) E/W
- Width: 100 km (62 mi) N/S

Geography
- Location within Kamchatka Krai Location within Far Eastern Federal District
- Location: Magadan Oblast; Kamchatka Krai, Russia
- Range coordinates: 63°40′N 164°0′E
- Parent range: Koryak Highlands; East Siberian Mountains

Geology
- Orogeny: Alpine orogeny
- Rock age: Cretaceous

Climbing
- Easiest route: From Kamenskoye

The Ichigem Range (Russian: Ичигемский Хребет) is a range of mountains in Magadan Oblast and Kamchatka Krai, Russian Far East.

Administratively most of the range falls within the Penzhinsky District of Kamchatka Krai, but the western end reaches into the Severo-Evensky District of Magadan Oblast.

== History ==
The area of the Ichigem Range was first mapped by geographer and ethnologist Baron Gerhard von Maydell (1835–1894) during his pioneering research of East Siberia.

== Geography ==
The Ichigem Range is the northwesternmost range of the Koryak Highland system. It stretches from WSW to ENE between the upper Penzhina valley to the north and the basin of the Oklan, a Penzhina right tributary, to the south. The Kolyma Mountains rise at the western limit of the range and the waterlogged lower Penzhina valley marks its eastern end. The mountains of the Ichigem are of moderate altitude. They are covered with tundra vegetation and have a barren look. The highest point of the range is an unnamed 1,465 metres (4,806 ft) high peak, located in the central sector of the range.

There are numerous vestiges of ancient glaciation in the Ichigem Range, but no modern glaciers. River Oklan has its sources in Mount Stolovaya of the western part of the Ichigem and flows roughly eastwards along the southern limits of the range, beyond which rises the Oklan Plateau (Окланское плато).

== See also ==
- List of mountains and hills of Russia
