= Ukelayat Range =

Mountain range in Kamchatka Krai, Russia

- хребет Укэлаят
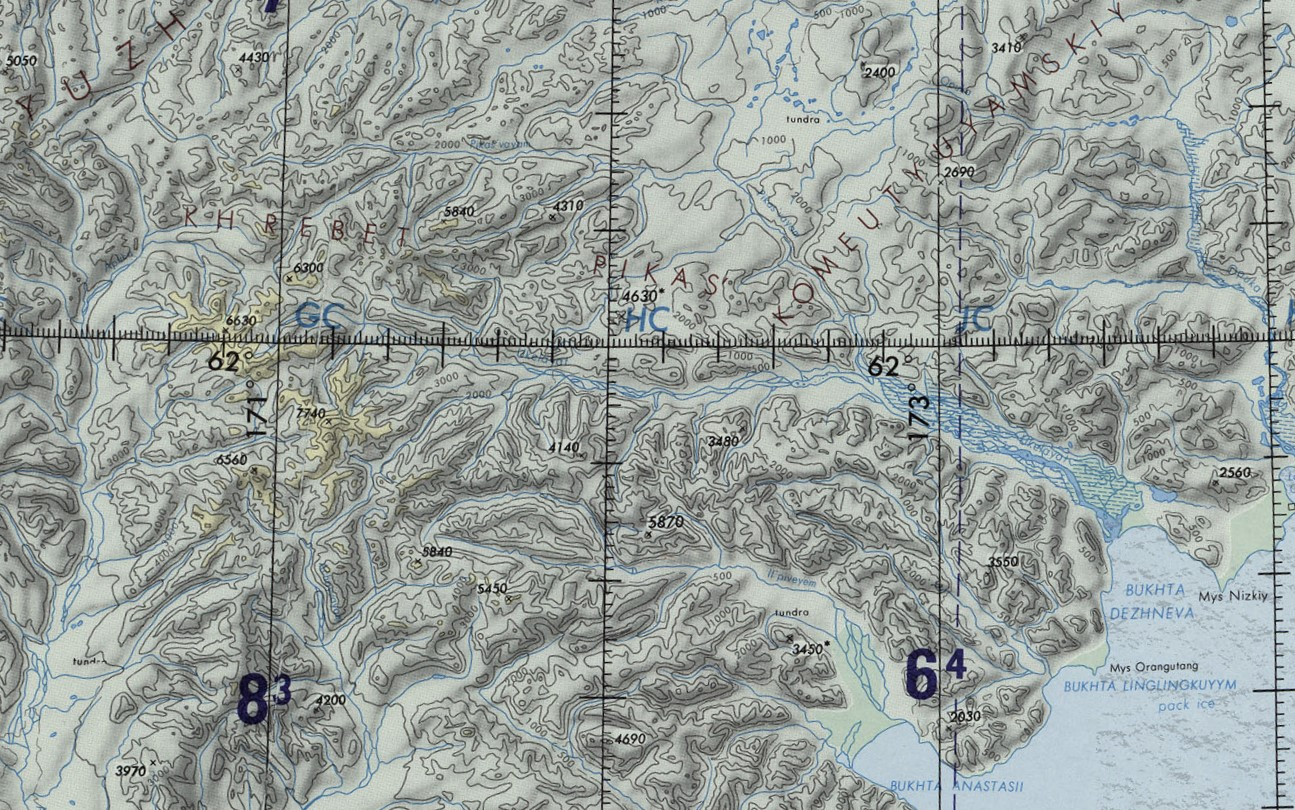
- The range stretching south of the Ukelayat river valley

Highest point
- Peak: Ledyanaya
- Elevation: 2,562 m (8,406 ft)
- Coordinates: 61°53′18.60″N 171°10′12.72″E

Dimensions
- Length: 150 km (93 mi) E/W
- Width: 40 km (25 mi) N/S

Geography
- Location within Kamchatka Krai Location within Far Eastern Federal District
- Location: Kamchatka Krai, Russia
- Range coordinates: 61°45′N 171°20′E
- Parent range: Koryak Highlands; East Siberian Mountains

Geology
- Orogeny: Alpine orogeny

Climbing
- Easiest route: From Khatyrka

The Ukelayat Range (Russian: хребет Укэлаят) is a range of mountains in Kamchatka Krai, Russian Far East. The range is part of the Koryak Highland system and administratively it belongs to Olyutorsky District.

The name of the range comes from the Koryak "vukvylgayat" (Вуквылгаят), meaning "rock/fall".

== Geography ==
The Ukelayat Range rises above the southern side of the valley of the Ukelayat river. It stretches in a roughly east–west direction with its eastern end close to the Bering Sea, between Dezhnyov Bay and Anastasii Bay. To the south rises the Snegovoy Range and to the north, above the other bank of the Ukelayat river, the Pikas Range.

The highest point is Ledyanaya, a 2,562 metres (8,406 ft) high rocky peak topped by an ice cap, which is also the highest point of the Koryak Highlands. To the east, not far from the sea, rises 1,295 metres (4,249 ft) high Mt Undyer (гора Ундер).

The Ukelayat Range has also the largest glacier of the highland area, the Slozhny Glacier with a surface of 4.1 square kilometres (2 sq mi). The range includes two of the three major glacier regions of the Koryak Highlands, having 344 glaciers with a total area of 102.5 square kilometres (40 sq mi).

== Flora and fauna ==
The mountains are covered with mountain tundra, bare rocky areas, dwarf forests and shrub birches. Willow thickets, with diamondleaf willow, feltleaf willow and Salix krylovii, may be found in some of the river valleys.

The Ukelayat Range provides a habitat for the snow sheep.

== See also ==
- Bering tundra
- List of mountains and hills of Russia
