= Olyutorsky District =

Olyutorsky District Олюторский район (Russian)
- District
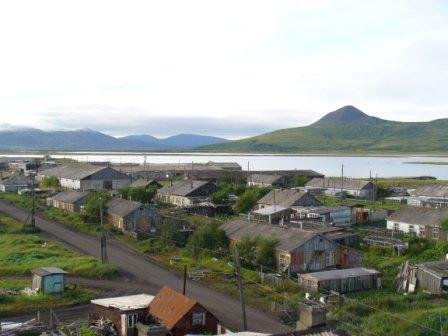
- Pakhachi, Dunkin Navel hill

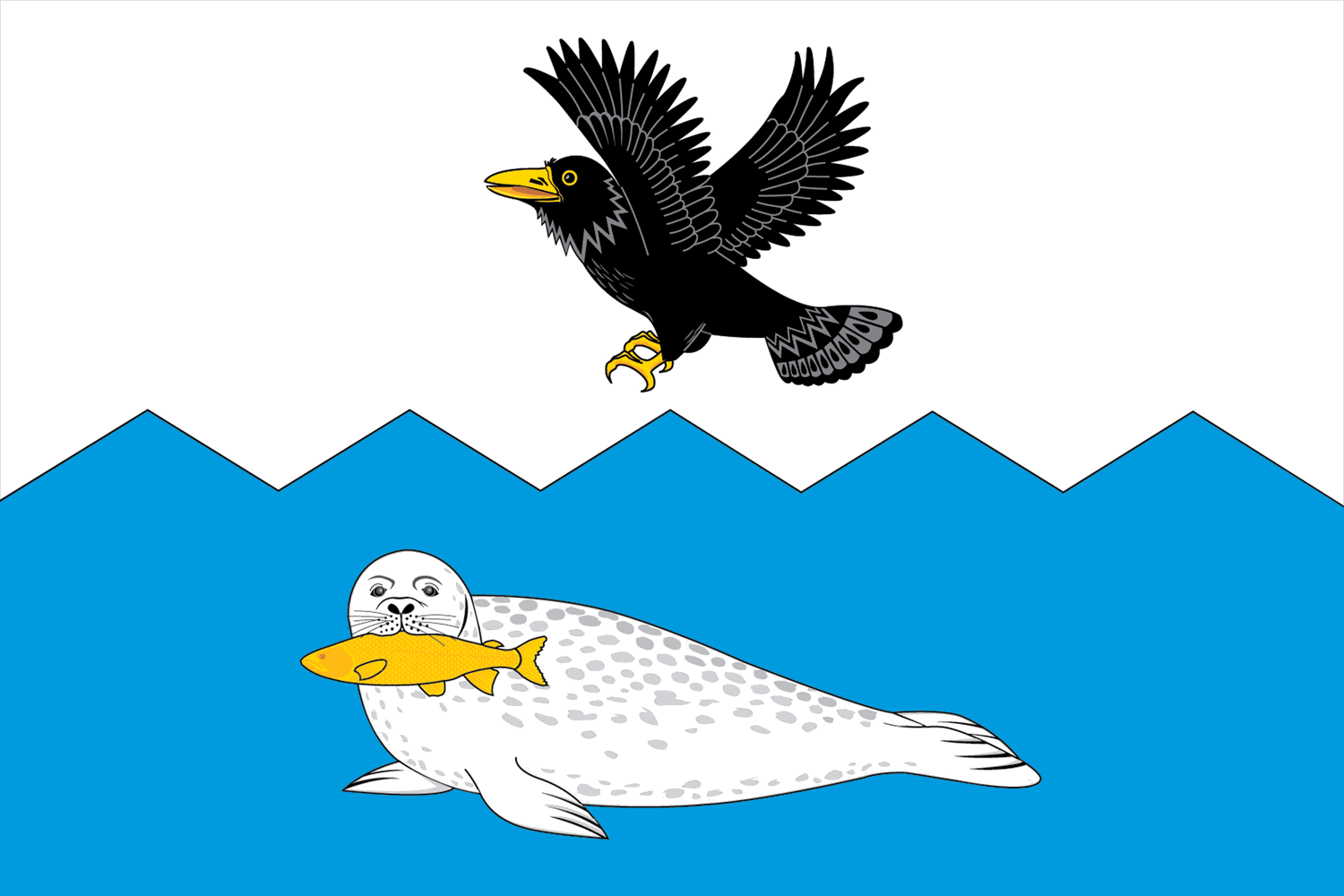
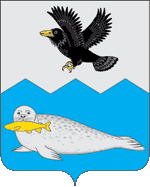
- Flag Coat of arms
- Location of Olyutorsky District in Koryak Okrug, Kamchatka Krai
- Coordinates: 61°N 169°E
- Country: Russia
- Federal subject: Kamchatka Krai
- Administrative center: Tilichiki

Area
  - Total: 72,352 km^{2} (27,935 sq mi)

Population (2010 Census)
  - Total: 5,036
  - Estimate (2023): 3,569
  - Density: 0.06960/km^{2} (0.1803/sq mi)
  - Urban: 0%
  - Rural: 100%

Administrative structure
  - Inhabited localities: 8 rural localities

Municipal structure
  - Municipally incorporated as: Olyutorsky Municipal District
  - Municipal divisions: 0 urban settlements, 7 rural settlements
- Time zone: UTC+12 (MSK+9)
- OKTMO ID: 30827000
- Website: http://xn----8sbwecbgwbbgrejm5q.xn--p1ai/

Olyutorsky District (Russian: Олю́торский райо́н) is an administrative and municipal district (raion) of Koryak Okrug of Kamchatka Krai, Russia, one of the eleven in the krai. It is located in the northeast of the krai. The area of the district is 72,352 square kilometers (27,935 sq mi). Its administrative center is the rural locality (a selo) of Tilichiki. Population: 3,700 (2021 census); 5,036 (2010 census); 7,170 (2002 census); 12,833 (1989 Soviet census). The population of Tilichiki accounts for 45.9% of the district's total population.

== Geography ==
The major rivers in the district are the Pakhacha and Apuka, having their headwaters close to the north-flowing Mayn River, as well as the Ukelayat and the Velikaya River flowing into the Bering Sea. Lantzeff speaks also of the Olyutora River, which does not appear on modern maps and which he distinguishes from the Pakhacha. The Olyutor Range, Pikas Range and Ukelayat Range mountain chains, as well as the southern part of the Komeutyuyam Range are in the district.

== History ==
In 1714, Russians built the ostrog (fortress) of Olyutorsk to control the coast and land route from Kamchatka to Anadyrsk; a function it shared with Aklansk. It was besieged by the Yukaghirs and Koryaks. It lost its importance after the sea route from Okhotsk was opened.

== Demographics ==
Historical population
Year	Pop.	±% p.a.
1939	8,983	—
1959	8,021	−0.56%
1970	9,959	+1.99%
1979	11,031	+1.14%
1989	12,833	+1.52%
2002	7,170	−4.38%
2010	5,036	−4.32%
2021	3,700	−2.76%
Source: Census data

The Alyutors, a branch of the Koryaks lived in the area or somewhat west. There were also Yukaghirs, some of whom had been brought south by the Russians.

- Russians – 43.8%
- Chukchi – 23.1%
- Koryaks – 21.5%
- Evens – 5.9%
- Ukrainians – 2.5%
- Tatars – 0.6%
- Others – 2.6%
