= Koryak Nature Reserve =

Nature reserve in Kamchatka, Russia

- Russian: Корякский заповедник (Also: Koryaksky)
- IUCN category Ia (strict nature reserve)
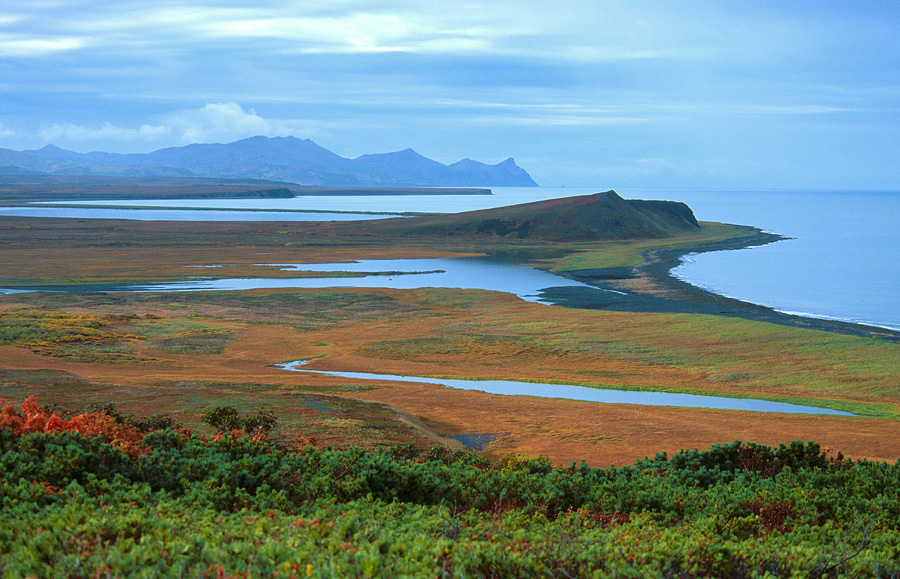
- Koryak Zapovednik

- Location within Russia
- Location: Kamchatka Krai
- Nearest city: Tilichiki
- Coordinates: 59°48′28″N 166°11′45″E
- Area: 327,106 hectares (808,297 acres; 1,263 sq mi)
- Established: 1995
- Governing body: Ministry of Natural Resources and Environment (Russia)
- Website: https://kronoki.ru/ru/kamchatka/koryakskiy-zapovednik/

Koryak Nature Reserve (Russian: Корякский заповедник) (also Koryaksky) is a Russian 'zapovednik' (strict nature reserve) Located in the north of the Kamchatka Peninsula, in the valley of the Kuyul River in the Russian Far East, and in separate coastal areas on the coast of the Bering Sea. The reserve includes the surrounding mountains of the Gauvin Peninsula and adjacent waters in Lavrov Bay, and one fourth of the total area covers waters of the Bering Sea. Koryak is an important area for large colonies of nesting waterfowl and migratory seabirds; studies have found that the majority of the seabirds migrating along the Kamchatka Peninsula spend their winters in Japan. Protecting this connection was one of the reasons for the establishment of the reserve in 1995. The rivers of Koryak are important spawning grounds for salmon. Also protected are the floral communities of the reserve, which include prime examples of "Bering forest tundra". The reserve is situated in the Koryak Okrug of Kamchatka Krai. The reserve covers an area of 327,106 ha (1,262.96 sq mi). The site is part of a Ramsar wetland area of international importance.

== Topography ==
The Koryak Reserve is divided into three sectors:

- Parapolsky Dollars (1,764 km^{2}, plus an adjacent protected area of 3,375 km^{2}). Located in the northwest of Kamchatka, Parapolsky includes the southern part of the Parapolsky Lowlands. This sector is mostly river valleys, including that of the Kuyul River, with flat broad plains. In Parapolsky are an estimated 10,000 lakes and thermokarst ponds in the river valleys and inter-mountain basins. The largest lake is Lake Talovskoye (44 km^{2}). This section of the Koryak reserve is located in Penzhinsky District.
- Cape Gauvin This sector covers the southern tip of the Gauvin Peninsula, which is separated from the main Kamchatka Peninsula by Karaginskiy Bay. The Bering Sea is to the east. The Koryak Highlands run through the Gauvin Peninsula, so Cape Gauvin is mountainous; unlike the Parapolsky sector, the rivers in the Cape Gauvin are mountainous, with cascades and waterfalls.
- Lavrov Bay The Lavrov Bay sector is north of Cape Gauvin, and the two areas share a common security zone. Lavrov is in the northeast of the peninsula.

A common feature of the areas is that they are mostly untouched by industrial activities of man. Except from some herring fishing facilities, long closed, the area is free of roads and structures.

== Climate and ecoregion ==
Koryak is located in the Bering tundra ecoregion, an area covering northeast Russia between the Bering Sea (to the east), the Kolyma Mountains (to the west), and the Kamchatka Peninsula to the south. The region is a noted as an area providing support for migratory birds and waterfowl. The Bering tundra region has a variety of terrains: coastal and interior boreal forest, tundra, mountains, river valleys, and wetlands. the northern part of the region has a more severe climate, while the southern area - in which the Koryak Reserve is located is milder.

The climate of Koryak is Subarctic climate, without dry season (Köppen climate classification Subarctic climate (Dfc)). This climate is characterized by mild summers (only 1–3 months above 10 °C (50.0 °F)) and cold, snowy winters (coldest month below −3 °C (26.6 °F)). The frost-free period is 90–95 days in the Parapolsky sector, and 130–145 days in the eastern coastal sectors. Wind is near constant: only 2% of days can be considered windless.

== Flora and fauna ==
The plant communities of the reserve are highly dependent on proximity to the sea, and altitude zonation. The richest floral families are the grasses and members of Asteraceae, plus species of the Ranunculaceae, Rosaceae, cabbage, and heath families. Otherwise, the area is relatively species-poor due to isolation since the pre-glacial time. Scientists on the reserve have recorded 312 species of vascular plants. The forested areas feature stunted trees, with willow, alder and poplar common on the floodplains. The slopes of the Koryak Highlands on the Gauvin Peninsula support cedar forests.

Scientists on the reserve have recorded 44 species of mammals: 24 permanent residents, 5 migrants, and 15 marine mammals. The rivers the reserve are important spawning grounds for salmon, chum, brown trout, brook trout, and the Kamchatka grayling. Because of its large, marshy character, the Parapolsky site is home to a wide variety of water and wading birds - ducks, geese, cormorants, and gulls. During the spring and autumn migration, hundreds of thousands of birds nest or rest on the site. The Koryak Highlands are one of the largest sites for bighorn sheep in northeast Asia. The Cape Gauvin and Lavosky sites, with coastal rocks and ledges, are home to over 30 large colonies of seabirds. Species include the Steller's sea eagle, Aleutian tern, and the spoon-billed sandpiper.

== Ecoeducation and access ==
As a strict nature reserve, the Koryak Reserve is mostly closed to the general public, although scientists and those with 'environmental education' purposes can make arrangements with park management for visits. Visits by individuals or groups from the general public require permits, which must be obtained in advance, for guided tours. There is a small environmental education center at the main office in the city of Tilichiki.

== See also ==
- List of Russian Nature Reserves (class 1a 'zapovedniks')
- National Parks of Russia
