= Vayegi =

Vayegi Ваеги Вааргын (Chukchi)
- Selo
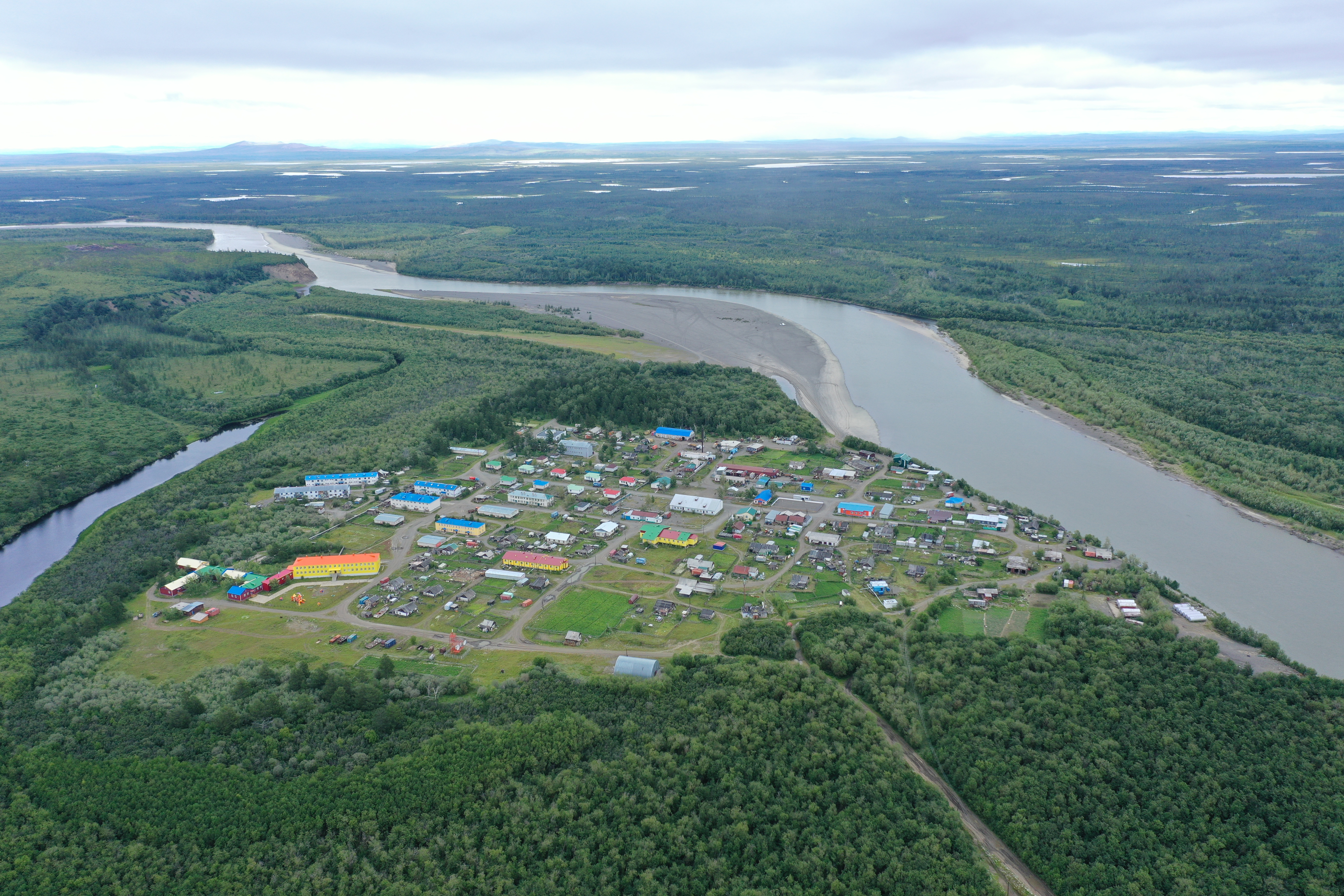
- Interactive map of Vayegi
- Location of Vayegi Vayegi (Chukotka Autonomous Okrug)
- Coordinates: 64°10′N 171°02′E
- Country: Russia
- Federal subject: Chukotka Autonomous Okrug
- Administrative district: Anadyrsky District
- Founded: 1951

Population (2010 Census)
  - Total: 497
  - Estimate (January 2018): 421 (−15.3%)

Municipal status
  - Municipal district: Anadyrsky Municipal District
  - Rural settlement: Vayegi Rural Settlement
  - Capital of: Vayegi Rural Settlement
- Time zone: UTC+12 (MSK+9)
- Postal code: 689534
- Dialing code: +7 42732
- OKTMO ID: 77603405101

Vayegi (Russian: Вае́ги; Chukot: Вааргын, Vaargyn; Koryak: Ваевви, Vaevvi) is a rural locality (a selo) in Anadyrsky District of Chukotka Autonomous Okrug, Russia, located near the border with Kamchatka Krai, on the banks of the river Mayn, southwest of Anadyr, the administrative center of the autonomous okrug. As of the 2010 Census, its population was 497.

== History ==
It was founded in 1951 as a result of the ongoing Soviet policy of collectivization. The kolkhoz (collective farm) that was founded around Vayegi brought together several groups of previously nomadic herders, including the more remote settlements of Beryozovo and the old settlement of Vayegi, which both became abandoned. After the dissolution of the Soviet Union, small rural localities like Vayegi were extremely hard hit economically. In 2000, for example, when the monthly living wage across Chukotka was estimated at 3,800 rubles, the average wage in Vayegi was in the range of 700–800 rubles.

== Administrative and municipal status ==
Within the framework of administrative divisions, Vayegi is subordinated to Anadyrsky District. Within the framework of municipal divisions, Vayegi is a part of Vayegi Rural Settlement within Anadyrsky Municipal District.

== Economy ==
Most of Vayegi's population is made up of indigenous people, mainly Chukchi, meaning that the focus of the local economy is on traditional hunting and fishing.

=== Transportation ===
Vayegi is not connected to the outside world by any road network. There are helicopter flights for passengers, from the Ugolny Airport in Anadyr, operated by Chukotavia.

== Demographics ==
As of the 2010 Census, the population was 497, which is an increase from the 2003 estimate of 457 reported the 2005 environmental impact report produced for the Kupol Gold Project. Of that population, 379 were of indigenous origin.

== Culture ==
Vayegi is known throughout the region for being a center for indigenous festivals, where each year a number of events are hosted, including the native festival of Kilvei, the Thanksgiving Ceremony, the Young Reindeer festival, and a dog sled race, where competitors race for the Governor's Cup.

Indigenous traditions are perpetuated through the presence of societies for the promotion of reindeer herding, as well as through an active folklore ensemble and a labor veterans club promoting traditional artistry and handicrafts. In addition to these indigenous services, Vayegi also supports a secondary school and a daycare center.

Local indigenous inhabitants' name for Vayengi is Varen (lit. tripod); from the Chukchi word for the horizontal supports of a yaranga.

A local legend has it that a hill near Vayegi was once the scene of a battle between the Chukchi and the Koryak people. The Chukchi took up position on a hill which they had soaked with water to prevent the Koryak from being able to climb it. The Koryak persisted and so the Chukchi loaded their sleds with stones, laid the horizontal supports from their yarangas across them, and sent them down the hill scattering the Koryak and winning the battle.

== Climate ==
Vayegi has a subarctic or boreal (taiga) climate (Dfc) with bitterly cold, very long winters and short, mild summers.

Climate data for Vayegi
Month	Jan	Feb	Mar	Apr	May	Jun	Jul	Aug	Sep	Oct	Nov	Dec	Year
Mean daily maximum °C (°F)	−17.0 (1.4)	−18.7 (−1.7)	−15.3 (4.5)	−7.6 (18.3)	3.4 (38.1)	15.8 (60.4)	19.3 (66.7)	16.1 (61.0)	8.9 (48.0)	−3.8 (25.2)	−14.2 (6.4)	−19.2 (−2.6)	−2.7 (27.1)
Daily mean °C (°F)	−22.4 (−8.3)	−24.0 (−11.2)	−21.1 (−6.0)	−13.4 (7.9)	−1.1 (30.0)	9.8 (49.6)	13.2 (55.8)	10.4 (50.7)	3.8 (38.8)	−8.5 (16.7)	−19.1 (−2.4)	−24.3 (−11.7)	−8.1 (17.5)
Mean daily minimum °C (°F)	−27.7 (−17.9)	−29.2 (−20.6)	−26.8 (−16.2)	−19.2 (−2.6)	−5.6 (21.9)	3.8 (38.8)	7.2 (45.0)	4.8 (40.6)	−1.3 (29.7)	−13.2 (8.2)	−24.0 (−11.2)	−29.4 (−20.9)	−13.4 (7.9)
Average precipitation mm (inches)	32 (1.3)	20 (0.8)	16 (0.6)	19 (0.7)	17 (0.7)	28 (1.1)	49 (1.9)	59 (2.3)	33 (1.3)	31 (1.2)	36 (1.4)	29 (1.1)	369 (14.4)

== See also ==
- List of inhabited localities in Anadyrsky District
