= Kamchatka Governorate =

Kamchatka Governorate Камчатская губерния (Russian)
- Former subdivision of Soviet Union
- 1922–1926
- Capital: Petropavlovsk-Kamchatsky
- History
  - Established: 10 November 1922
  - Disestablished: 4 January 1926
Preceded by	Succeeded by
Kamchatka Oblast (Russian Empire)	Far Eastern Krai
- Today part of: Russia

Kamchatka Governorate (Russian: Камчатская губерния) was an administrative-territorial unit of the RSFSR, which existed in 1922 to 1926. The center is the city of Petropavlovsk Port (since 1924 Petropavlovsk-Kamchatsky).

The province was formed on November 10, 1922, from the former Kamchatka region.

It was divided into 6 districts: Anadyrsky, Chukotsky, Gizhiginsky, Okhotsky, Commander and Petropavlovsk.

== History ==
In the mid-1920s, administrative-territorial reform began to be carried out in the USSR. All counties and volosts were replaced by districts.

The Kamchatka Gubernia Committee began preparatory work on the zoning of the Kamchatka province in the second half of 1925, as preparations were already underway for administrative-territorial transformations in the Far East. On October 7, 1925, at a meeting of the Kamchatka Provincial Revkom, a project for zoning the Kamchatka province was considered. The territories of the 14 former volosts that had formed by that time in the Kamchatka Okrug were taken as the basis for the new administrative-territorial formations. They were only in the former Petropavlovsk district – 9 volosts.

On January 4, 1926, the province was liquidated and transformed into Kamchatka Okrug. Its territory became part of the Far Eastern Krai.

== Literature ==
- Russian Far East during the 1917 revolutions and civil war. —Vladivostok, 2003
