= Aklansk =

Coordinates: 62°34′0″N 166°38′0″E

Aklansk is a ghost town in Russia on the river Oklan. It location is in the mainland part of the Penzhinsky District, Kamchatka Krai.

== History ==
Aklanski Ostrog (Russian: Акланский острог) or Penzhinskoye zimovye (Пенжинское зимовье) was an ostrog (fortified settlement) in Russia between 1679 and 1750 on the river Oklan (then Chajachla or Aklan), into which the Penzhina flows. The city, established by Vladimir Atlasov as a stronghold to collect yasak from the Koryaks, was not much more than a fortified place, having the status of uezd town. The place was also hated by the Koryaks (the place burned down several times) and the Yukaghirs (which besieged the place once). The nearest place was the Anadyrsk ostrog, in the middle reaches of the Anadyr.

The town was established in the location of the former ostrog in 1783. In 1805 it was demoted to the status of rural settlement.
