= Beryozovo, Chukotka Autonomous Okrug =

Beryozovo
- Location in Russia
- Coordinates: 63°24′26″N 172°44′34″E
- Country: Russia
- Autonomous Okrug: Chukotka Autonomous Okrug
- District: Anadyrsky District
- Elevation: 643 ft (196 m)
- Postal code: 689534

Beryozovo (Russian: Берёзово) is an abandoned selo in the Anadyrsky District of Chukotka Autonomous Okrug in Russia. It was located on the left bank of the Velikaya. In 1949, it was a center of a revolt against the central authority, which was related to forcible collectivization of reindeer herds.

In 1951, the whole population of the selo was resettled to Vayegi.
