= Kamchatka Oblast (Russian Empire) =

Administrative region

Kamchatka Oblast Камчатская область (Russian)
- Oblast of the Russian Empire
- 1849–1856; 1909–1922
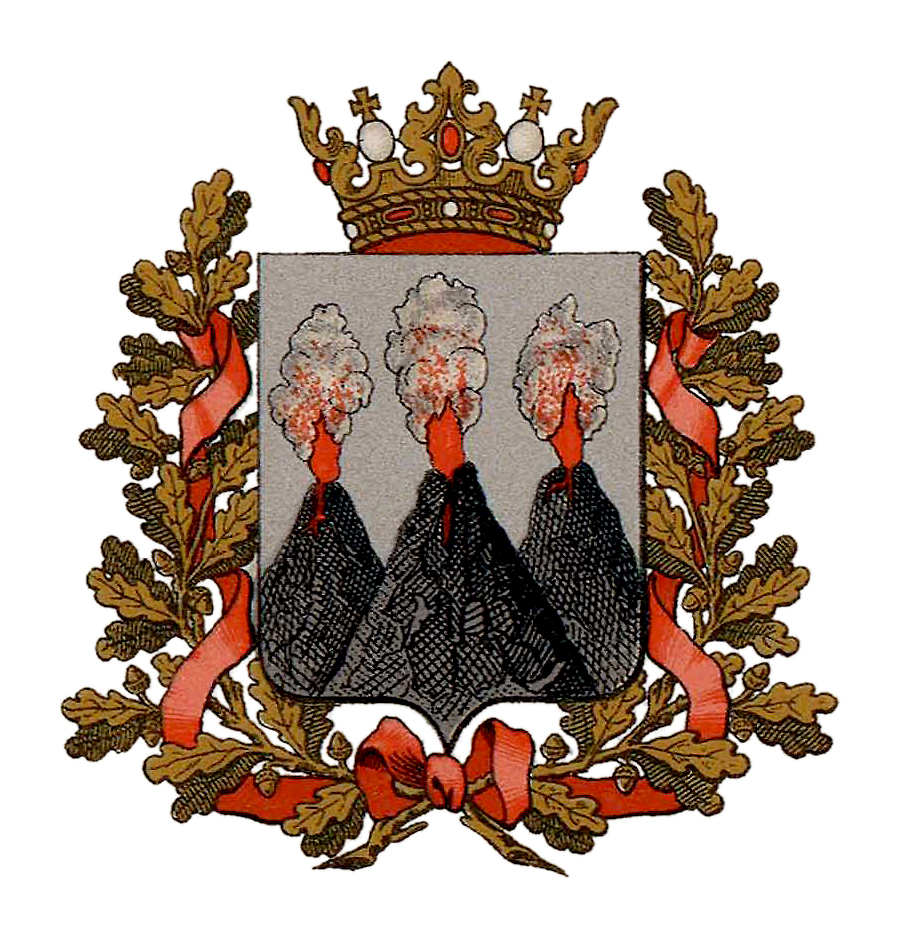
- Coat of arms

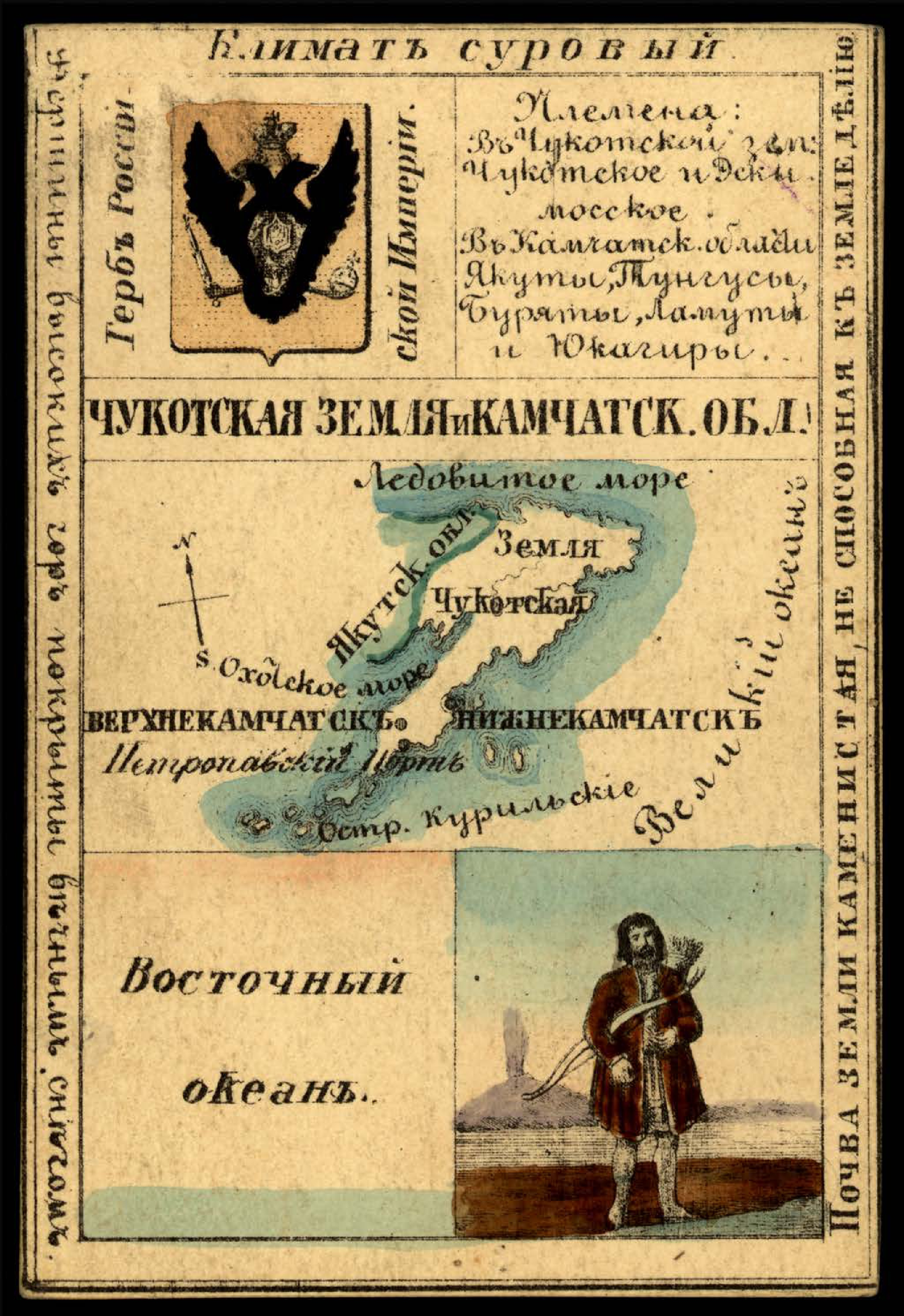
- Capital: Petropavlovsk
- Area
- 1,301,271.746 km^{2} (502,423.830 sq mi)
- Population
- 37,300
- History
  - Established: 1803
  - Disestablished: 1922
Preceded by	Succeeded by
Irkutsk Governorate	Kamchatka Governorate
- Today part of: Russia

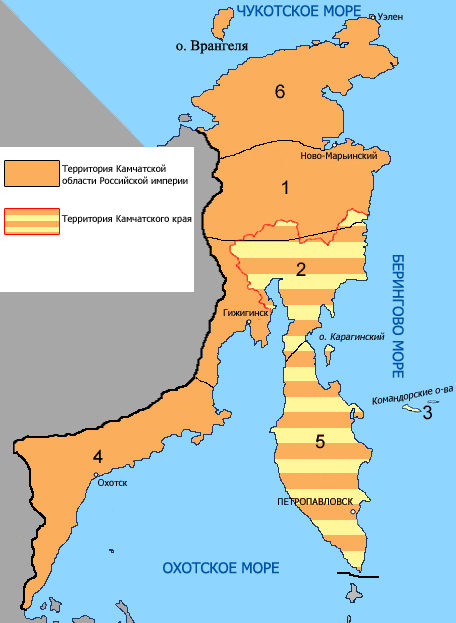
The territory of the Kamchatka Oblast by 1914. Uyezds: 1. Anadyr, 2. Gizhiginsky, 3. Commander, 4. Okhotsky, 5. Petropavlovsk, 6. Chukotka

Kamchatka Oblast (Russian: Камчатская область, romanized: Kamchatskaya oblast') was an administrative-territorial unit (oblast) of the Russian Empire. The oblast corresponds with the modern day Kamchatka Krai.

== History ==
Originally, the Kamchatka Oblast was part of the Irkutsk Governorate and was formed on August 23, 1803. The center of the Oblast was appointed Verkhne-Kamchatsk, on April 21, 1812, the administration of the region was transferred to Petropavlovsk harbor. In 1822 the Oblast was abolished. Instead, in the Irkutsk Governorate, the Kamchatka Maritime Administration was established with its center in Petropavlovsk.

In 1849, the Kamchatka Oblast was re-established from the Kamchatka Maritime Administration and the Gizhiginsky District of the Okhotsk Maritime Administration. However, already in 1856, the Kamchatka Oblast was abolished, and its territory became part of the Primorskaya Oblast.

By the law of June 30, 1909, the Kamchatka Oblast was created for the third time. The Oblast included Petropavlovsk, Okhotsk, Gizhiginsky, Anadyr Uyezds and the Commander Islands, separated from the Primorskaya Oblast. At the same time, in the territory of Chukotka (part of the Anadyr Uyezd) the Chukotka Uyezd was formed. In 1922, the Kamchatka Oblast was transformed into the Kamchatka Governorate.

== Administrative divisions ==
Administrative divisions in 1909:

№	Uezd	Center	Coat of arms	Area, versts²	Population (1911)
1	Petropavlovsky	Petropavlovsk		339,697,1	10,200
2	Anadyrsky	Novo-Mariinsk		458,476,6	12,700
3	Gizhiginsky	Gizhiginsk		185,347,7	8,100
4	Komandorsky	—		1,524,0	1,300
5	Okhotsk	Okhotsk		158,365,4	5,000
6	Chukotsky	—		—	—

=== Former cities ===
№	City	Population (1897)	Included in	Coat of arms
1	Aklansk	0 people (completely abandoned)	Gizhiginsky district	
2	Nizhnekamchatsk	107 people	Petropavlovsk district	

== Coat of arms description ==
"In the silver shield there are three knolls or black fire-breathing mountains (middle one in front of the other two) with a scarlet flame and smoke above them. The shield is crowned with the ancient royal crown and is surrounded by golden oak leaves, connected by the Alexander Ribbon".

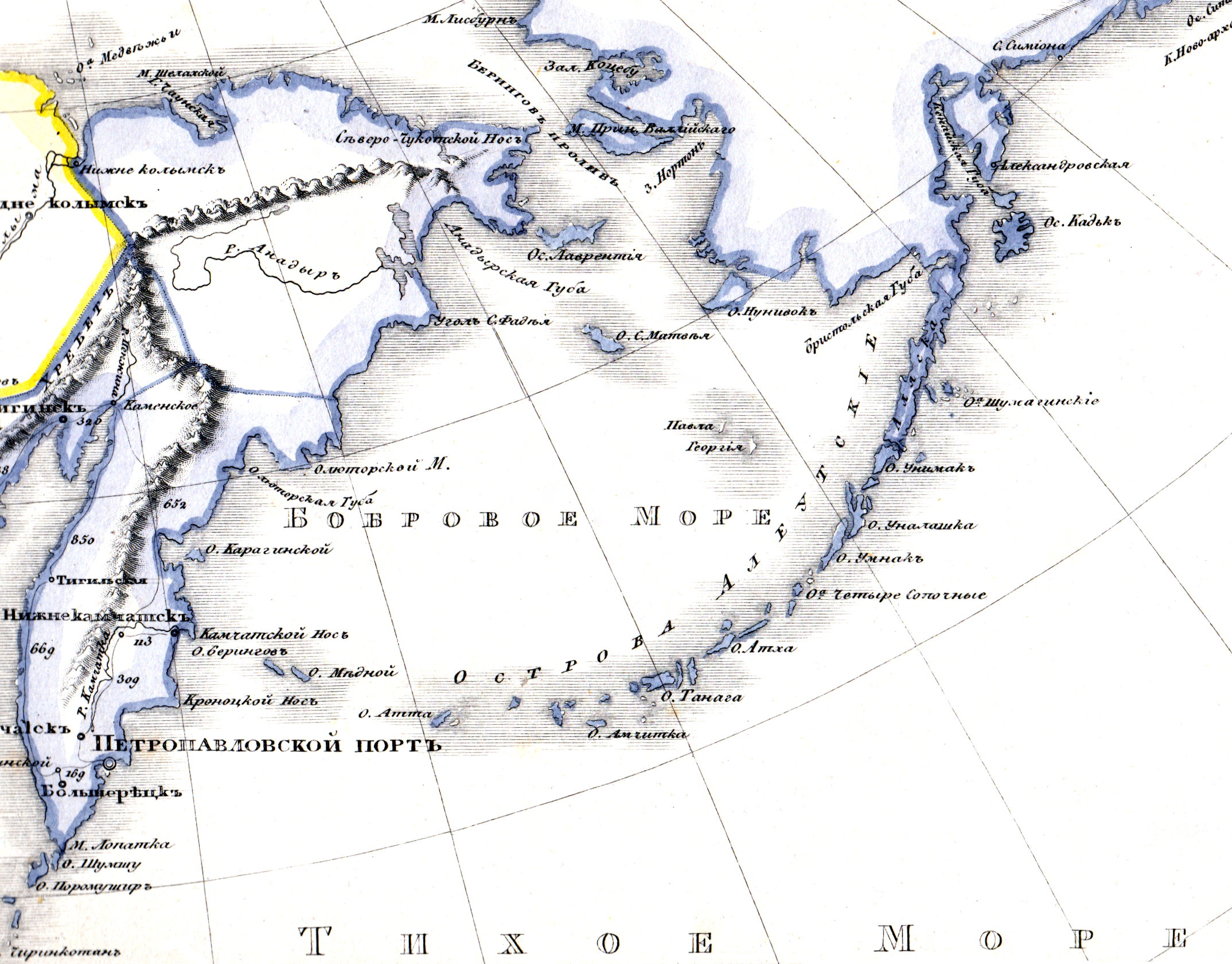
On the map of the Russian Empire in 1833

== Population ==
According to the census of 1897, the population of the Kamchatka Oblast is sparse in numbers, which is also indicated by the population density, the Commander district is clearly distinguished among the general districts, in which the average population density is 10 times more.

The population of the districts of the Kamchatka Oblast for 1897:

District	Area, square versts	Area, square kilometers	Density, person per square kilometer	Men	Women	Total
Anadyr	458 476,6	521 774,91	0,02	5 941	6 143	12 084
Gizhiginsky	185 347,7	210 937,22	0,04	3 837	3 655	7 492
Commander	1 524,0	1 734,41	0,38	322	329	651
Okhotsk	158 365,4	180 229,68	0,03	2 394	2 338	4 732
Petropavlovsk	339 697,1	386 596,44	0,02	4 241	4 124	8 365
Kamchatka Oblast	1 143 411	1 301 272,66	0,03	16 735	16 589	33 324

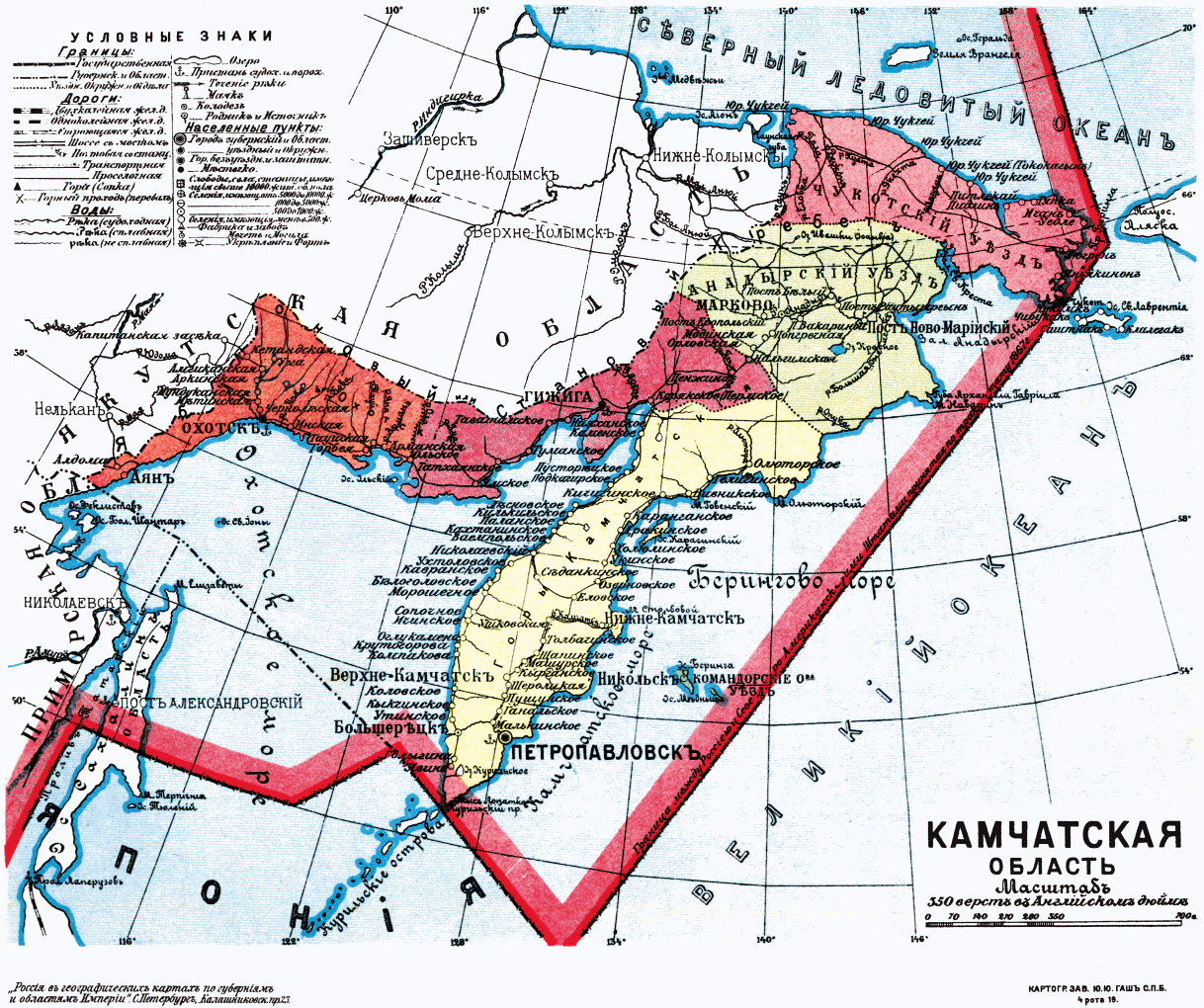
Kamchatka Oblast in 1913

== Oblast administration ==
=== 1st period (1803–1822) ===
Rulers

Name	Title or rank	Time of filling the post
Pavel Koshelev	Major general	August 11, 1803 – November 14, 1806
Ivan Petrovsky	Major general	November 14, 1806 – January 23, 1813
Ilya Rudakov	Lieutenant	January 23, 1813 – May 1817
Peter Ricord	Captain 1st rank	May 1817 – 1822

=== 2nd period (1849–1856) ===
Military Governor

Name	Title or rank	Time of filling the post
Vasily Zavoyko	Counter admiral	December 2, 1849 – October 31, 1856

=== 3rd period (1909–1922) ===
Governors

Name	Title or rank	Time of filling the post
Vasily Perfilyev	Active State Councillor	July 22, 1909 – June 18, 1912
Nikolay Monomahov	Active State Councillor	June 18, 1912 – 1917

Vice Governors

Name	Title or rank	Time of filling the post
Evgeny Bodungen	Collegiate Assessor	July 8, 1909 – 1913
Alexander Chaplinsky	Active State Councillor	1914–1917
