= Oklan =

Oklan Оклан / Ыӄлан
- Mouth location in Kamchatka Krai

Location
- Country: Russia
- Federal subject: Kamchatka Krai
- District: Penzhinsky District

Physical characteristics
- Source
  - location: Ichigem Range; Koryak Highlands
  - coordinates: 63°34′36″N 163°43′03″E
  - elevation: 540 metres (1,770 ft)
- Mouth: Penzhina
  - coordinates: 62°33′11″N 166°32′50″E
  - elevation: 23 metres (75 ft)
- Length: 272 km (169 mi)
- Basin size: 12,600 km^{2} (4,900 sq mi)
- Discharge
  - average: 138 m^{3}/s (4,900 cu ft/s)

The Oklan (Russian: Оклан; Koryak: Ыӄлан) is a river in Kamchatka Krai, Russia. The length of the river is 272 kilometres (169 mi) and the area of its drainage basin is 12,600 square kilometres (4,900 mi^{2}). It is the second most important tributary of the Penzhina after the Belaya.

The name of the river comes from the Koryak yḳlan (ыӄлан), meaning 'icy way'.

== History ==
Russian Cossack explorers reached the Oklan river basin in the 17th century and built the Aklansk fort. The fort was abandoned in 1804. At that time the indigenous Koryaks were engaged in reindeer herding and fishing. The settlement was revived in the 20th century as a state farm dedicated to reindeer-breeding.

== Course ==
The Oklan has its source in Mount Stolovaya, located in the western part of the Ichigem Range, at the NW end of the Koryak Highlands. It flows roughly eastwards along the southern limits of the range area, descending into a swampy floodplain with numerous small lakes where it splits into branches. Finally it meets the right bank of the Penzhina 97 km (60 mi) from its mouth in the Bering Sea.

The river is fed mainly by snow and freezes in October, staying under thick ice until May. The melting of the ice in the river valley continues during the summer period. The main tributaries of the Oklan are the 62 km (39 mi) long Khayoklam (Хайоклан) from the right and the 91 km (57 mi) long Bolshoy Chalbugchan (Хайоклан) from the left.

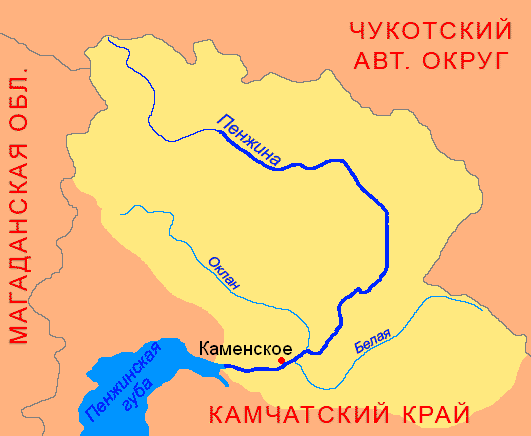
Basin of the Penzhina with its two main tributaries

== Flora and fauna ==
The Oklan river basin is characterized by discontinuous permafrost with tundra vegetation, including mosses, lichens, dwarf shrubs, and sedges. There are birches and poplars growing along the river banks in the floodplain.

Among the fish species in the river the pike and the grayling deserve mention.

== See also ==
- Bering tundra
- List of rivers of Russia
