= Vasily Perfilyev =

Russian statesman (1865–1914)

Vasily Vlasyevich Perfilyev
- Василий Власьевич Перфильев

1st Governor of Kamchatka Oblast
- In office July 22, 1909 – June 18, 1912
- Succeeded by: Nikolay Monomakhov

Personal details
- Born: January 25, 1865
- Died: June 25, 1914 (aged 49) Moscow Governorate, Russian Empire
- Children: 2
- Education: Imperial Kharkov University (1888), Imperial Medical Surgical Academy (1893)
- Portfolio: Candidate of Physical and Mathematical Sciences
- Awards: Order of Saint Vladimir; Order of Saint Anna; Order of Saint Stanislaus

Vasily Vlasyevich Perfilyev (Russian: Василий Власьевич Перфильев; January 25, 1865 – June 25, 1914) was an Imperial Russian statesman and public figure, and the first governor of the Kamchatka Oblast (July 22, 1909 – June 18, 1912).

The son of a sergeant of the Trans-Baikal Cossack army, a direct descendant of the founder of Bratsk ostrog Maksim Perfilyev.

In 1888 he graduated from the Imperial Kharkov University, receiving the degree of candidate. After being drafted into the army, he was sent to St. Petersburg and was trained at the Imperial Military Medical Academy with the rank of doctor. From 1893 he served in Khabarovsk, first as an infantry doctor, then as a doctor in a military district.

In 1897 he was transferred to civil service, was the clerk of the office of the Amur Governor-General, temporarily served as ruler of the office.

Simultaneously, from 1894 to 1902, the director of the Nikolaev Public Library in Khabarovsk.

In 1904 – 1906 special assignments official at the Amur Governor-General. In 1906 – 1909 honorary magistrate of the district of the Vladivostok district court.

In 1909, on the advice of Governor-General Pavel Unterberger, he was appointed Acting Governor of the Kamchatka Oblast. He stayed in this position until June 1912, he retired for health reasons as a state councilor.

Awarded Order of Saint Stanislaus, 2nd and 3rd classes, Order of Saint Anna, 2nd and 3rd classes, Order of Saint Vladimir, 4th class.

He died at the age of 49 in the Moscow region.

Sons – Boris and Victor.

== Sources ==
- Nesterova, Elena (2004). Russian administration and Chinese migrants in the South of the Far East of Russia: the second half of the XIX – beginning of the XX century. INO-Center (Information. Science. Education). Publishing House of the Far Eastern University. p. 371. ISBN 9781310365447.
