= Ukelayat =

Ukelayat Укэлаят / Вуквылгаят
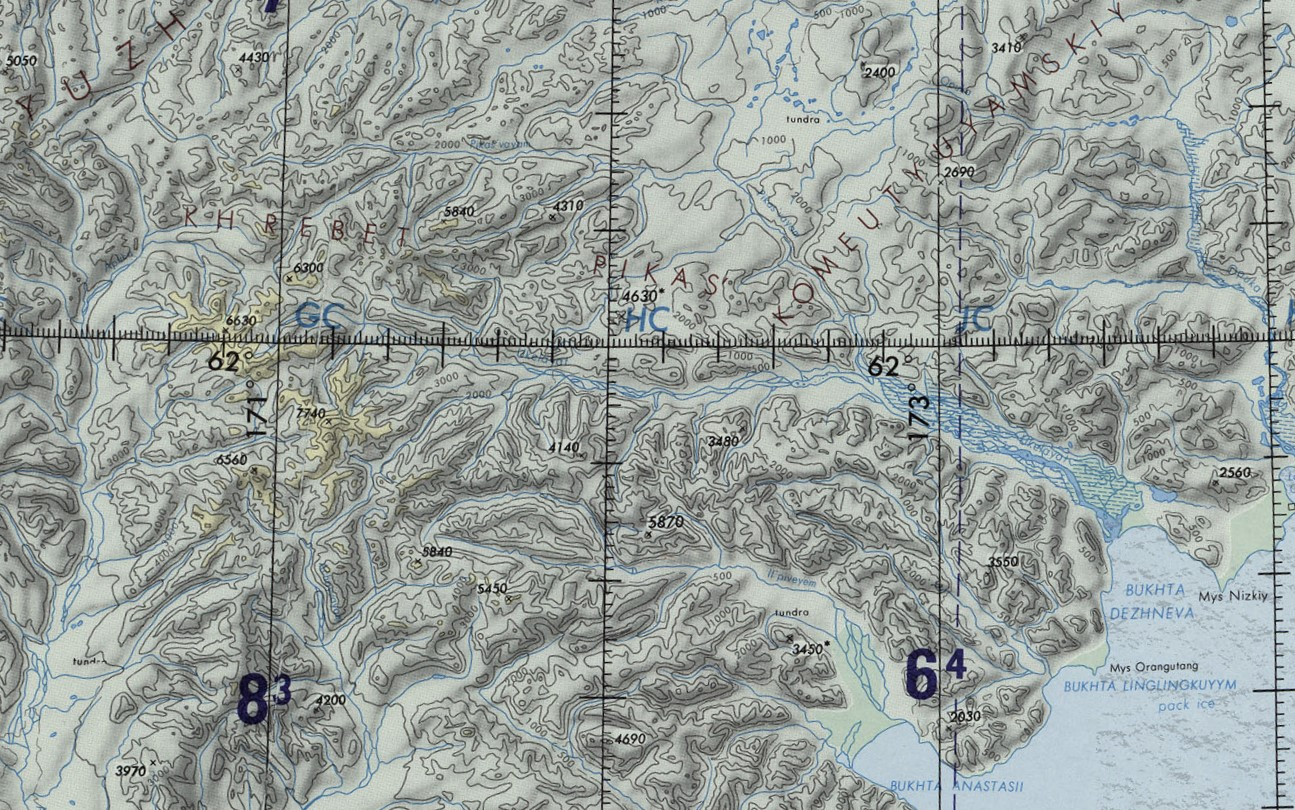
- Course of the Ukelayat map section

- Mouth location in Kamchatka Krai

Location
- Country: Russia
- Federal subject: Kamchatka Krai
- District: Olyutorsky District

Physical characteristics
- Source
  - location: Koryak Highlands
  - coordinates: 61°59′28″N 170°53′0″E
  - elevation: ca 1,000 metres (3,300 ft)
- Mouth: Bering Sea
  - coordinates: 61°43′15″N 173°31′12″E
  - elevation: 0 metres (0 ft)
- Length: 118 km (73 mi)
- Basin size: 6,820 km^{2} (2,630 sq mi)

The Ukelayat (Russian: Укэлаят; Koryak: Вуквылгаят) is a river in Kamchatka Krai, Russia. The length of the river is 118 kilometres (73 mi) and the area of its drainage basin is 6,820 square kilometres (2,630 mi^{2}).

The name of the river comes from the Koryak vukvylgayat (вуквылгаят), meaning 'rock, fall'.

== Course ==
The Ukelayat has its source in the Koryak Highlands. It is fed by glaciers of the northern slopes of the adjoining ranges. It flows roughly eastwards within a valley bound by the Pikas Range to the north and the Ukelayat Range to the south. The river divides into channels along its middle and lower course. Its mouth is in the small Dezhnyov Bay of the Bering Sea.

Its main tributary is the 148 km (92 mi) long Pikasvayam, joining it from the left about halfway through its course.

== Flora and fauna ==
The river basin is characterized by tundra vegetation, including mosses, lichens, dwarf shrubs, and sedges.

== See also ==
- Bering tundra
- List of rivers of Russia
