= Koryak Mountains =

Mountain range in the country of Russia

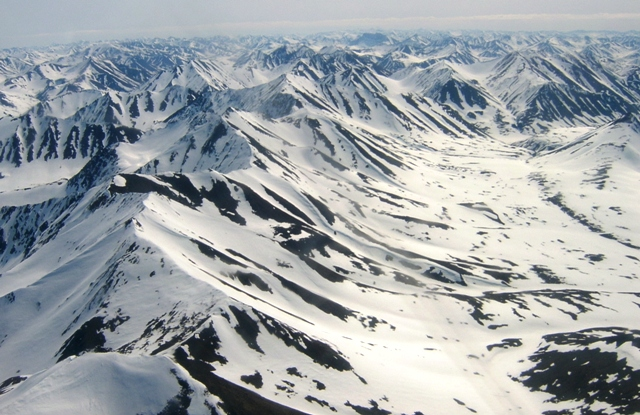
- View of one of the ranges.

Highest point
- Peak: Ledyanaya
- Elevation: 2,562 m (8,406 ft)
- Coordinates: 62°30′N 172°00′E

Dimensions
- Length: 880 km (550 mi) NE/SW
- Width: 270 km (170 mi) NW/SE

Geography
- Location within Far Eastern Federal District
- Location: Chukotka Autonomous Okrug / Kamchatka Krai, Russian Far East
- Parent range: East Siberian System

Geology
- Orogeny: Alpine orogeny
- Rock age(s): Cenozoic, Mesozoic
- Rock type: Ophiolites

The Koryak Mountains or Koryak Highlands (Russian: Корякское нагорье) are an area of mountain ranges in Far-Eastern Siberia, Russia, located in Chukotka Autonomous Okrug and in Kamchatka Krai, with a small part in Magadan Oblast. The highest point in the system is the 2,562-metre-high (8,406 ft) Mount Ledyanaya, located in the Ukelayat Range, in the central part of the mountains.

== Geography ==
The Koryak Mountains rise south of the Anadyr River, and northeast of the Kamchatka Peninsula. The Koryak Highlands are one of the largest glacial systems in the northern part of the Russian Far East. There are numerous glaciers and ice fields in some of the ranges, with a total surface of 303.5 km^{2} (117.2 sq mi).

=== Subranges ===
The system of the Koryak Mountains comprises a number of subranges, including:

- Vetvey Range, highest point 1,640 metres (5,380 ft)
- Vaeg Range, highest point 1,226 metres (4,022 ft)
- Pakhachin Range, highest point 1,715 metres (5,627 ft)
- Apuk Range
- Vatyna Range
- Penzhina Range, highest point 996 metres (3,268 ft)
- Gizhigin Range, highest point 1,059 metres (3,474 ft)
- Ichigem Range, highest point 1,465 metres (4,806 ft)
- Pylgin Range, highest point 1,355 metres (4,446 ft)
- Olyutor Range, highest point 1,568 metres (5,144 ft)
- Neprokhodimy Range, highest point 1,450 metres (4,760 ft)
- Southern Mayn Range, highest point 1,265 metres (4,150 ft)
- Snegovoy Range, highest point 1,712 metres (5,617 ft)
- Pikas Range, highest point 1,106 metres (3,629 ft)
- Ukelayat Range, highest point 2,562 metres (8,406 ft)
- Komeutyuyam Range, highest point 1,142 metres (3,747 ft)
- Koyverelan Range, highest point 1,077 metres (3,533 ft)
- Rarytkin Range, at the northern end, close to Lake Krasnoye.
- Ukvushvuynen Range, highest point 1,423 metres (4,669 ft), the easternmost, close to Lake Pekulney.

=== Rivers ===
Rivers Main, Khatyrka, Velikaya and Ukelayat, as well as the Penzhina, with its Oklan and Belaya tributaries, are among the main watercourses of the Koryak Mountains.

== See also ==
- Shirshov Ridge
