= Aklanon =

Aklanon may refer to:

- Aklanon people, of the Aklan province in the Philippines
- Aklanon language, their Austronesian language

== See also ==
- Aklan Province
- Aklan River
- Aklan (disambiguation)
