= Penzhinsky District =

Penzhinsky District Пенжинский район (Russian)
- District
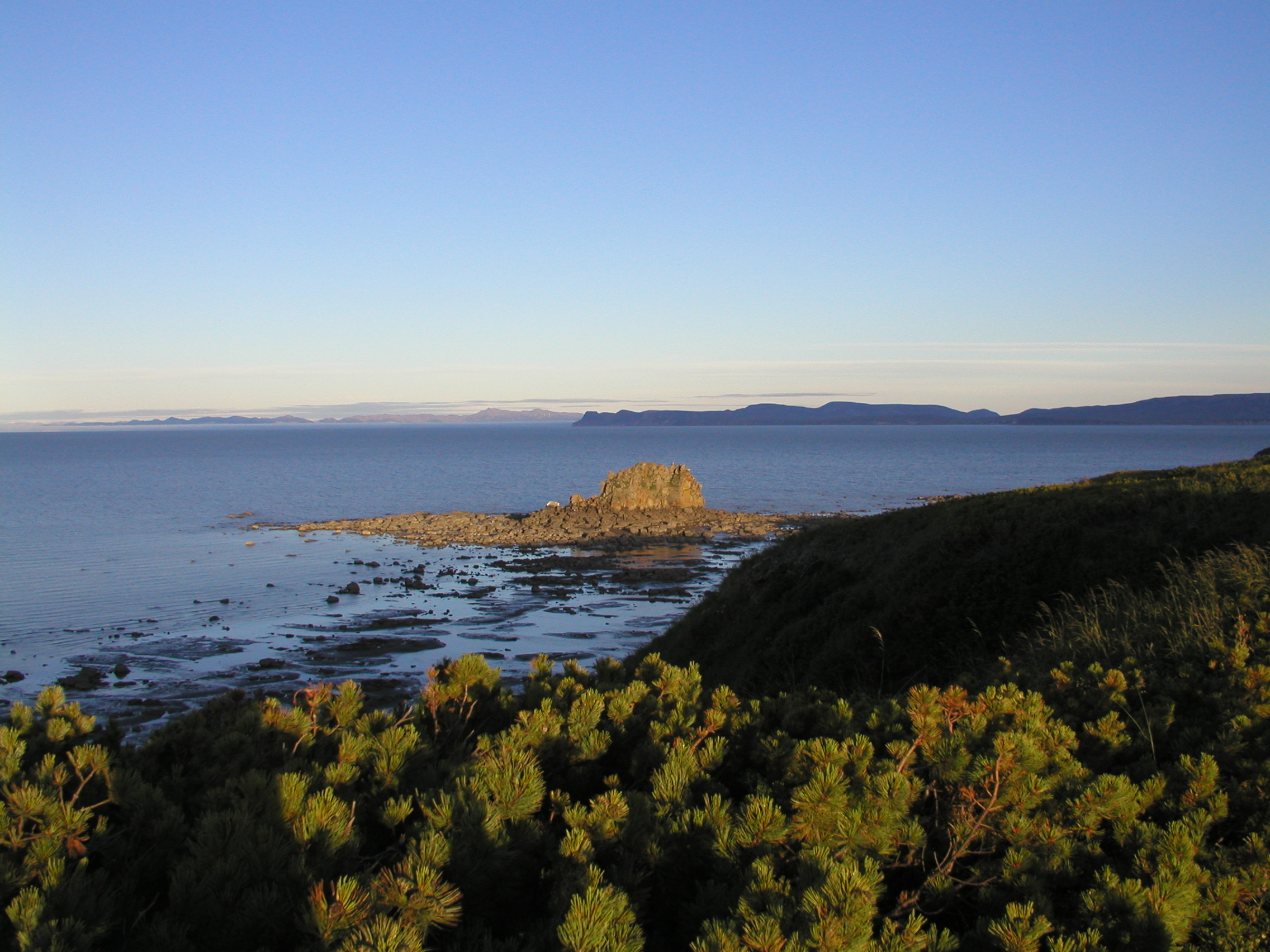
- Coast in Penzhinsky District

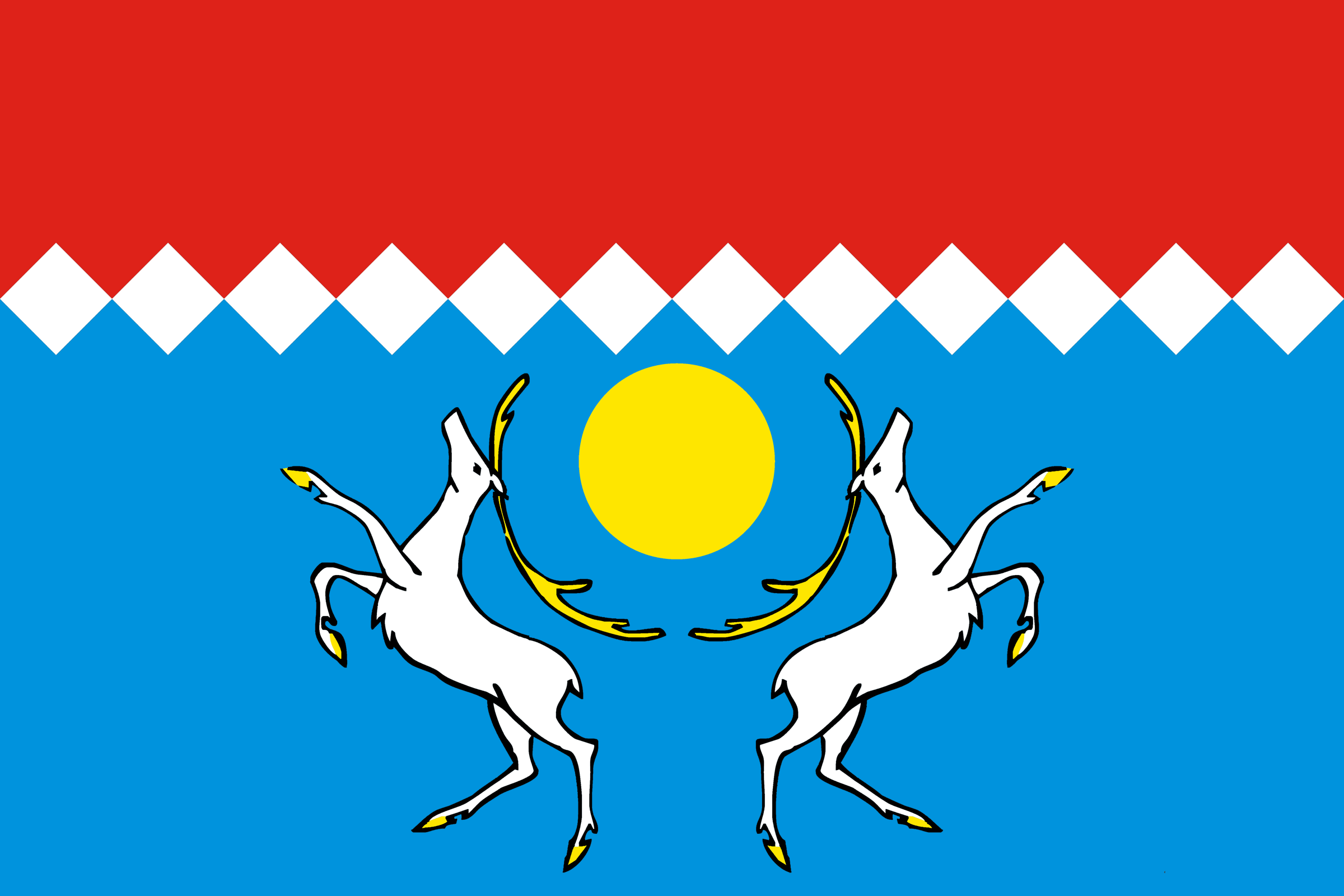
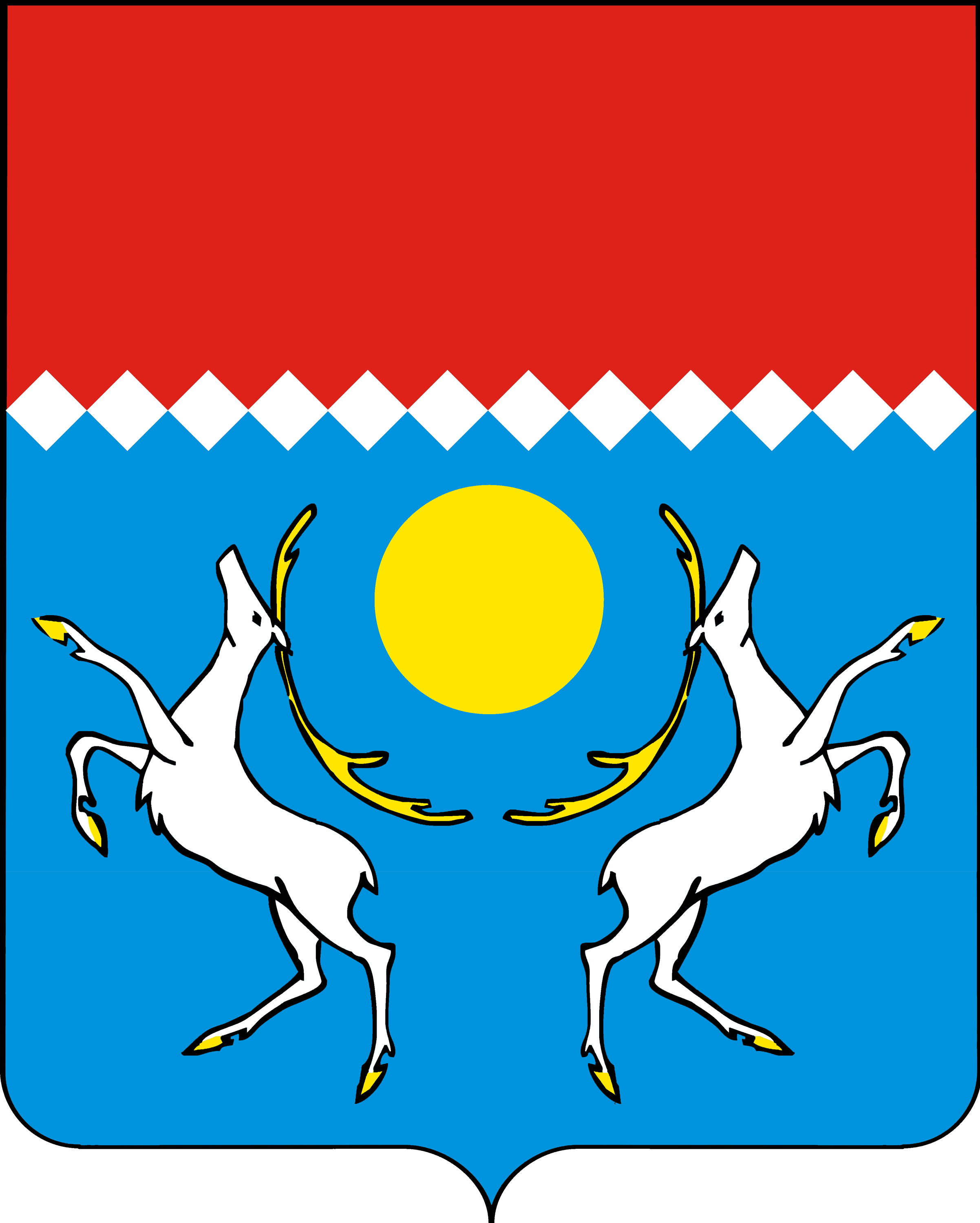
- Flag Coat of arms
- Location of Penzhinsky District in Koryak Okrug, Kamchatka Krai
- Coordinates: 63°N 167°E
- Country: Russia
- Federal subject: Kamchatka Krai
- Established: 1 April 1926
- Administrative center: Kamenskoye

Area
  - Total: 116,086 km^{2} (44,821 sq mi)

Population (2010 Census)
  - Total: 2,340
  - Density: 0.0202/km^{2} (0.0522/sq mi)
  - Urban: 0%
  - Rural: 100%

Administrative structure
  - Inhabited localities: 7 rural localities

Municipal structure
  - Municipally incorporated as: Penzhinsky District
  - Municipal divisions: 0 urban settlements, 5 rural settlements
- Time zone: UTC+12 (MSK+9)
- OKTMO ID: 30829000
- Website: http://xn----8sbnekahce1acgmcyl.xn--p1ai/

Penzhinsky District (Russian: Пе́нжинский райо́н) is an administrative and municipal district (raion) of Koryak Okrug in Kamchatka Krai, Russia, one of the eleven in the krai. It is located in the northwest of the krai. Its administrative center is the rural locality (a selo) of Kamenskoye. Population: 2,340 (2010 census); 2,990 (2002 census); 5,301 (1989 Soviet census). The population of Kamenskoye accounts for 28.0% of the district's total population.

Ethnic composition (2021):

- Koryaks – 44.8%
- Russians – 29.8%
- Evens – 12%
- Chukchi – 6.1%
- Ukrainians – 1.4%
- Others – 5.9%

== Geography ==
The area of the district is 116,086 square kilometers (44,821 sq mi).

The Ichigem Range, the northwesternmost range of the Koryak Highlands, rises in the district. Rivers Penzhina, Belaya, Oklan, Esgichninvayam and Zhirovaya are the main rivers flowing through the territory of the district.
