= Mayn =

Mayn Майн
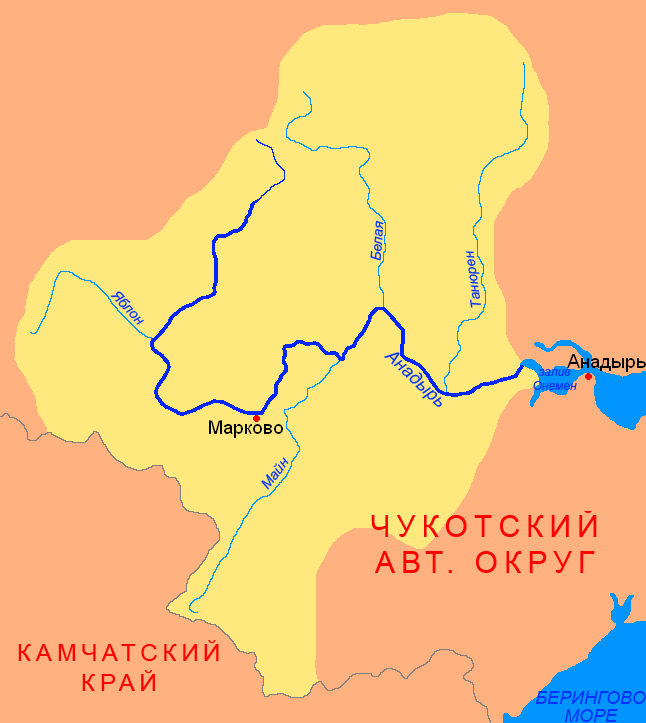
- The Mayn in the Anadyr River Basin

- Location in Chukotka Autonomous Okrug
- Etymology: "Great River"
- Native name: Мэйнывээм (Chukot)

Location
- Country: Russia
- Federal subject: Chukotka Autonomous Okrug
- Inhabited places: Vayegi, Ust-Mayn

Physical characteristics
- Source
  - location: Koryak Highlands
  - elevation: 240 metres (790 ft)
- Mouth: Anadyr
  - coordinates: 65.1206°N 172.2389°E
  - elevation: 9 metres (30 ft)
- Length: 475 km (295 mi)
- Basin size: 32,800 km^{2} (12,700 sq mi)

Basin features
- Progression: Anadyr→ Bering Sea

The Mayn (Russian: Майн; Chukot: Мэйнывээм, meaning "The Great River") is a river in Chukotka Autonomous Okrug (Magadan Oblast) in Russia, one of the major tributaries of the Anadyr. The length of the river is 475 kilometres (295 mi). The area of is drainage basin is 32,800 square kilometres (12,700 mi^{2}).

== Course ==
It flows roughly northwards from its source in the small Maynskoe Lake, located in the northern part of the Parapol Valley, in the Penzhinsky Range of the Koryak Highlands. The river passes then through sparsely populated areas of the forest-tundra subzone of Chukotka. Finally it joins the right bank of the Anadyr.

The Mayn meets the Anadyr at Ust-Mayn in the mid-lower stretch of its course, in an area of wetlands and small lakes, about 65 kilometres (40 mi) further upstream from the confluence of the Anadyr and the Belaya. All these rivers are frozen for about eight to nine months in a year between mid-October and the end of May.

There were ancient settlements in the Mayn basin. In present times Vayegi town lies in the Mayn's middle course and Ust-Mayn village at the confluence of the rivers Mayn and Anadyr.

Administratively the whole basin of the Mayn and its tributaries belong to the Chukotka Autonomous Okrug.

== Flora and fauna ==
The vegetation of the river basin includes mosses, lichens, dwarf shrubs, and sedge.

The chum salmon and the sockeye salmon are common in the waters of the Mayn.

== See also ==
- List of rivers of Russia
