= Kamenskoye, Kamchatka Krai =

Selo in Penzhinsky District, Kamchatka Krai, Russia

Kamenskoye Каменское
- Selo
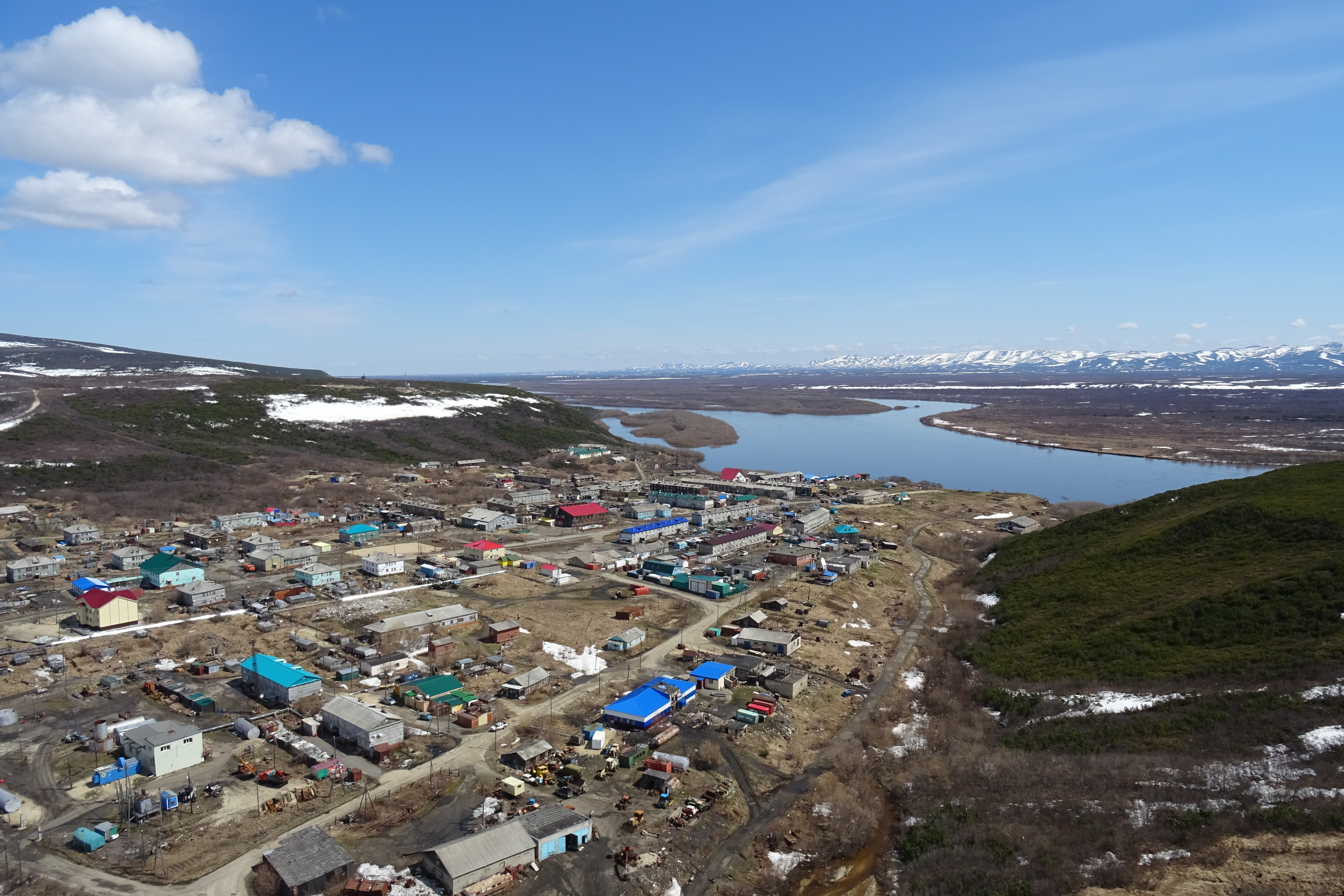
- Interactive map of Kamenskoye
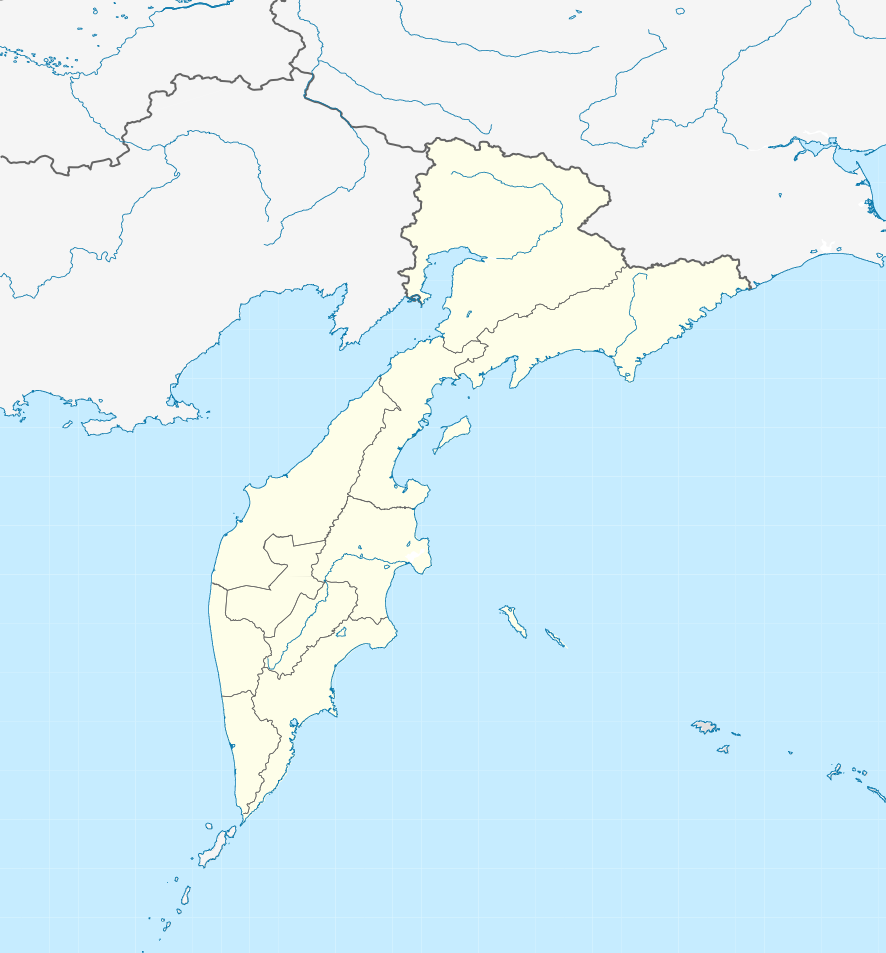
- Location of Kamenskoye Kamenskoye (Kamchatka Krai)
- Coordinates: 62°26′N 166°05′E
- Country: Russia
- Federal subject: Kamchatka Krai
- Administrative district: Penzhinsky District
- Founded: 1931
- Elevation: 40 m (130 ft)

Population (2010 Census)
  - Total: 655
  - Estimate (2021): 630 (−3.8%)

Administrative status
  - Capital of: Penzhinsky District
- Time zone: UTC+12 (MSK+9)
- Postal code: 688850
- OKTMO ID: 30829402101

Kamenskoye (Russian: Каменское) is a rural locality (a selo) and the administrative center of Penzhinsky District of Koryak Okrug of Kamchatka Krai, Russia, located on the bank of the river Penzhina. Population: 655 (2010 census); 652 (2002 census); 1,369 (1989 Soviet census).

== Climate ==
Kamenskoye has a subarctic climate (Köppen climate classification Dfc) with severely cold winters – although not nearly so extreme as the winters of the Yana and Indigirka basins – and mild summers. Precipitation is moderate and is heaviest in August and lightest in May.

Climate data for Kamenskoye (Climate ID:25745)
Month	Jan	Feb	Mar	Apr	May	Jun	Jul	Aug	Sep	Oct	Nov	Dec	Year
Record high °C (°F)	6.8 (44.2)	6.5 (43.7)	6.2 (43.2)	8.2 (46.8)	21.9 (71.4)	29.5 (85.1)	39.3 (102.7)	31.4 (88.5)	21.5 (70.7)	15.2 (59.4)	6.4 (43.5)	7.4 (45.3)	39.3 (102.7)
Mean maximum °C (°F)	−3.5 (25.7)	−4.7 (23.5)	0.5 (32.9)	4.5 (40.1)	16.0 (60.8)	23.7 (74.7)	28.4 (83.1)	24.4 (75.9)	17.9 (64.2)	7.0 (44.6)	0.6 (33.1)	−4.0 (24.8)	29.4 (84.9)
Mean daily maximum °C (°F)	−19.6 (−3.3)	−18.9 (−2.0)	−14.6 (5.7)	−6.4 (20.5)	5.4 (41.7)	15.9 (60.6)	19.0 (66.2)	16.3 (61.3)	9.9 (49.8)	−2.4 (27.7)	−13.5 (7.7)	−19.3 (−2.7)	−2.3 (27.9)
Daily mean °C (°F)	−23.4 (−10.1)	−22.7 (−8.9)	−18.9 (−2.0)	−10.9 (12.4)	1.4 (34.5)	10.4 (50.7)	13.7 (56.7)	11.6 (52.9)	5.5 (41.9)	−6.1 (21.0)	−17.3 (0.9)	−23.0 (−9.4)	−6.6 (20.1)
Mean daily minimum °C (°F)	−27.2 (−17.0)	−26.5 (−15.7)	−23.3 (−9.9)	−15.4 (4.3)	−2.6 (27.3)	4.8 (40.6)	8.3 (46.9)	6.9 (44.4)	1.0 (33.8)	−9.8 (14.4)	−21.0 (−5.8)	−26.7 (−16.1)	−11.0 (12.2)
Mean minimum °C (°F)	−40.4 (−40.7)	−38.2 (−36.8)	−34.5 (−30.1)	−25.9 (−14.6)	−7.6 (18.3)	1.1 (34.0)	4.3 (39.7)	1.0 (33.8)	−5.5 (22.1)	−18.6 (−1.5)	−31.5 (−24.7)	−39.6 (−39.3)	−41.9 (−43.4)
Record low °C (°F)	−52.4 (−62.3)	−48.8 (−55.8)	−48.4 (−55.1)	−38.2 (−36.8)	−27.6 (−17.7)	−4.5 (23.9)	−2.6 (27.3)	−8.3 (17.1)	−15.2 (4.6)	−32.3 (−26.1)	−43.9 (−47.0)	−52.6 (−62.7)	−52.6 (−62.7)
Average precipitation mm (inches)	34.8 (1.37)	29.9 (1.18)	23.6 (0.93)	19.4 (0.76)	17.4 (0.69)	29.6 (1.17)	44.8 (1.76)	61.2 (2.41)	42.1 (1.66)	31.0 (1.22)	31.9 (1.26)	31.8 (1.25)	397.5 (15.66)
Average precipitation days (≥ 0.1 mm)	13.5	11.5	11.4	11.5	10.1	9.4	11.1	13.3	11.3	13.5	14.2	13.1	143.9
Average relative humidity (%)	83.5	82.3	83.9	82.5	77.9	73.3	76.3	81.3	79.7	85.5	88.0	84.4	81.6
Mean monthly sunshine hours	44	97	182	223	222	264	234	171	129	90	48	23	1,727
Source: climatebase.ru
