= Bering tundra =

Ecoregion in Russia

Bering Tundra
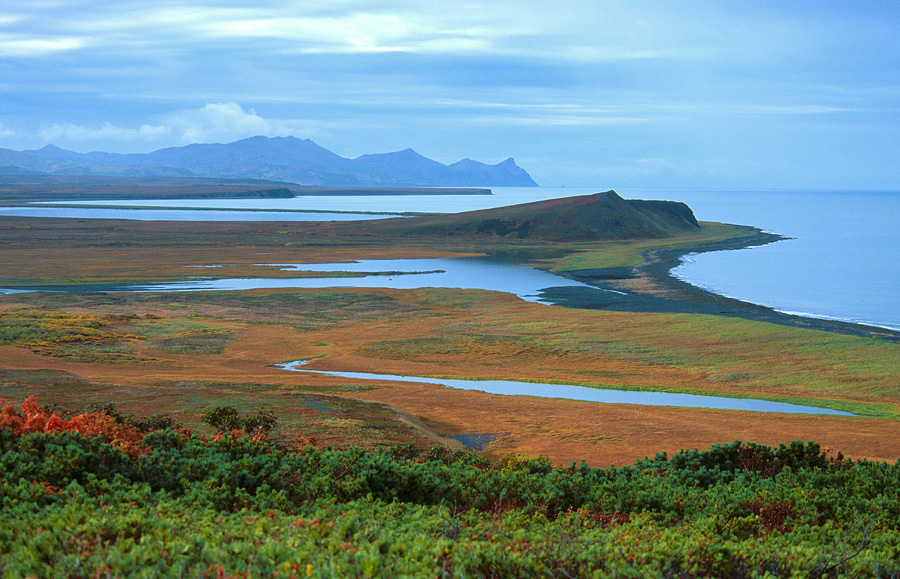
- Koryak Nature Reserve

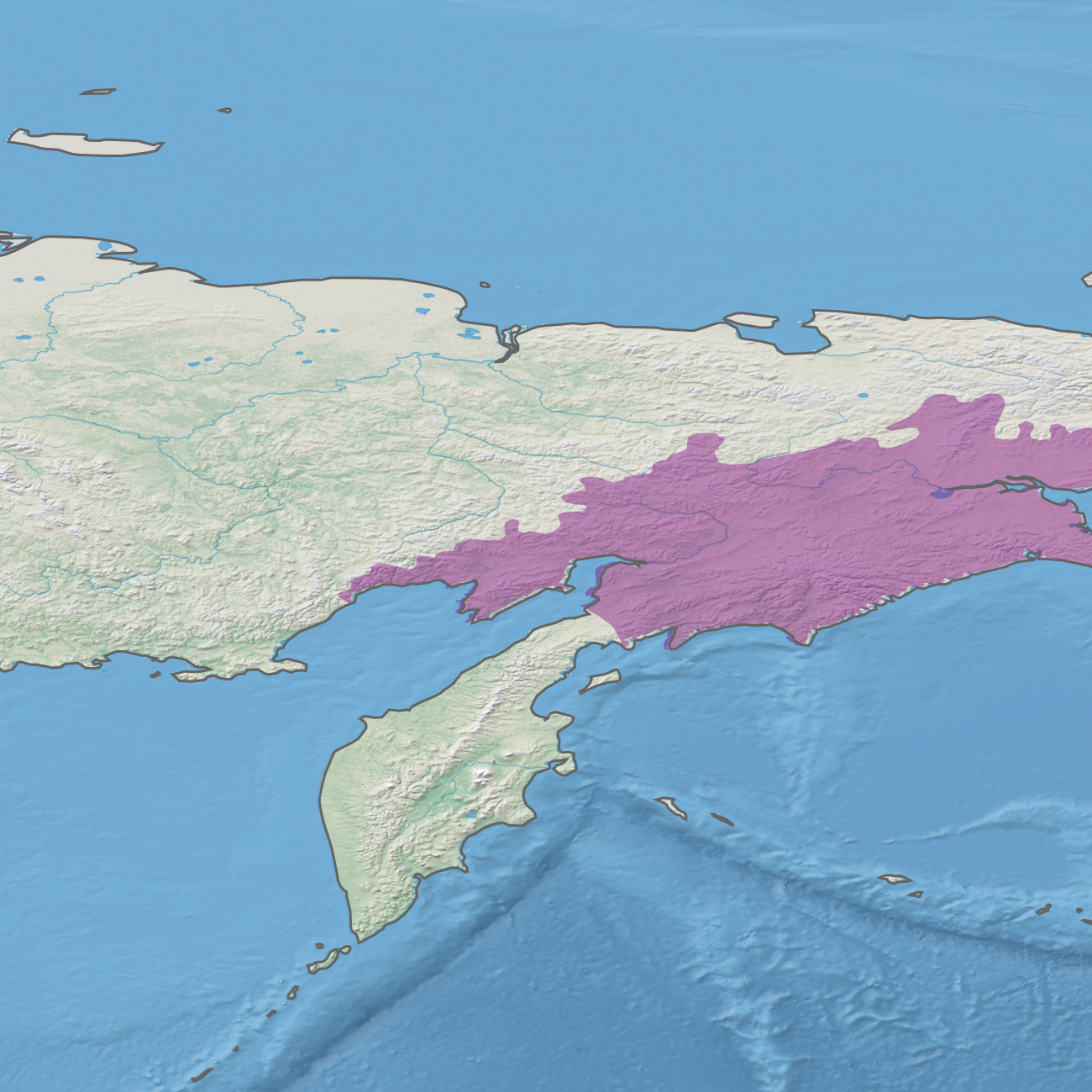
- Ecoregion territory (in purple)

Ecology
- Realm: Palearctic
- Biome: Tundra

Geography
- Area: 474,200 km^{2} (183,100 mi^{2})
- Country: Russia
- Coordinates: 63.75°N 168.75°E

The Bering tundra ecoregion (WWF ID: PA1102) is an ecoregion that covers a portion of Russia, between the Kolyma Mountains on the west, and the Bering Sea coast to the east. The area is an important stopping place for migratory birds. It has an area of 474,227 square kilometres (183,100 mi^{2}).

== Location and description ==
The ecoregion stretches approximately 1,000 km on alignment from southwest-to-northeast, between the Kolyma Mountains on the west, the Bering Sea coast to the east, and Kamchatka peninsula to the south.

== Climate ==
The climate of Koryak is subarctic (Köppen climate classification (Dfc)). This climate is characterised by long cold winters (at least one month averaging below 0 °C (32 °F)), and short, cool summers (one to three months greater than 10 °C (50 °F), but no month averaging above 22 °C (72 °F)). Mean precipitation is about 358 mm/year. The mean temperature at the center of the ecoregion is −24.1 °C (−11.4 °F) in January, and 12.2 °C (54.0 °F) in July.

== Flora and fauna ==
The ecoregion supports flora and fauna typical of forest-tundra. Low-lying areas may feature stunted trees and willow and alder on floodplains. Elsewhere the ground cover is grasses, heaths, and members of the families Asteraceae, Ranunculaceae, and Rosaceae. Mosses and lichens take over at higher elevations. Species diversity is relatively low due to the harsh climate and the isolation of the area since glacial times. Large mammals the include the East Siberian brown bear, the Anadyr fox, and some bighorn sheep in the highlands. Common smaller mammals include the East Siberian ermine and the American mink. Large colonies of migrating birds rest or nest in the area every summer and autumn. Numbers of over 700,000 individuals and 200 species have been recorded in the ecoregion.

== Protections ==
There is at least one significant nationally protected area in this ecoregion, the Koryak Nature Reserve, on the northeastern region of Kamchatka, stretching from mountains to the coast. A 2017 estimate approximated that 43,231 square kilometers of the region are included in protected areas.

== See also ==
- List of ecoregions in Russia
