= Penzhina =

River in Russia

Penzhina Пенжина / Мыгыкивэем
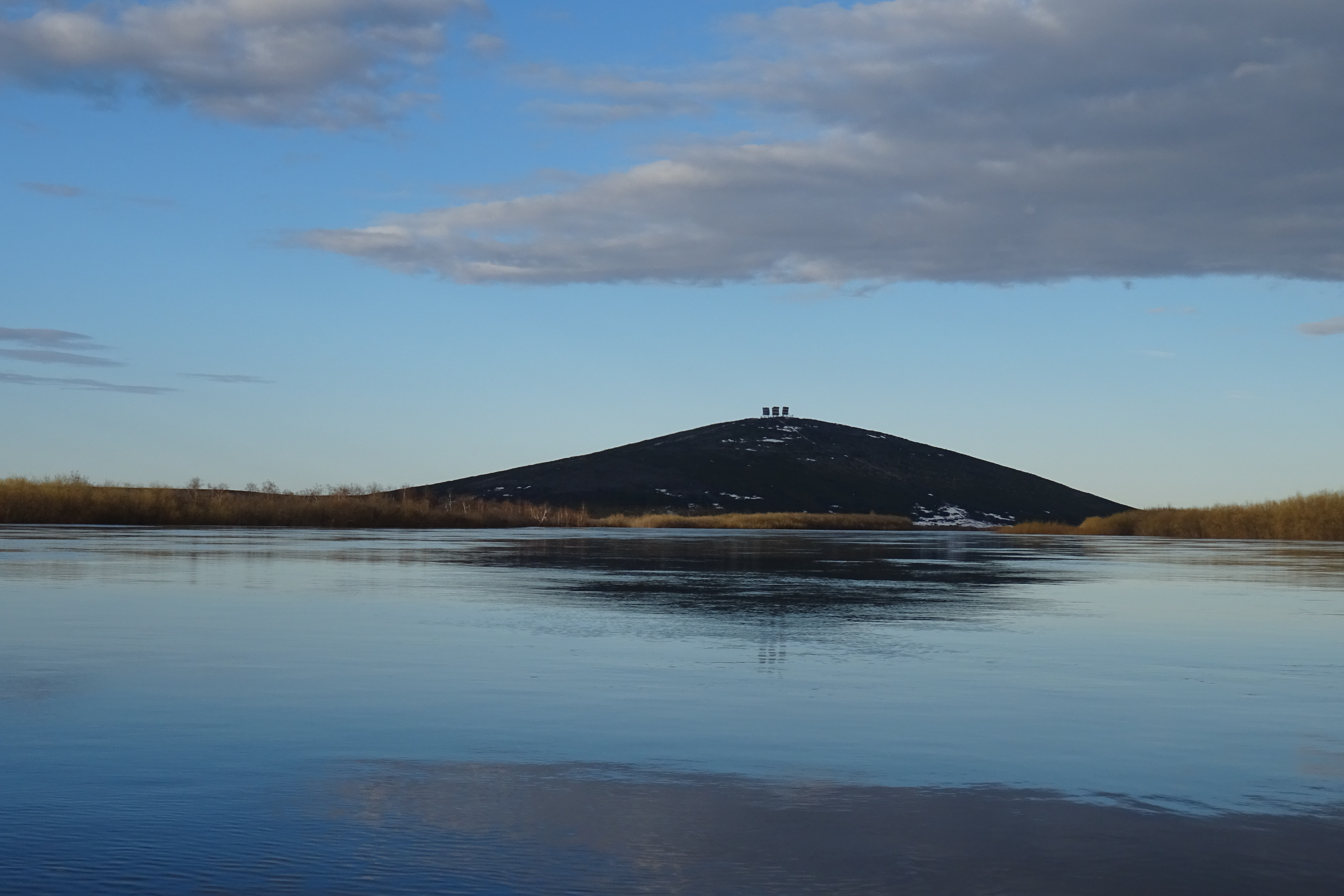
- View of the Penzhina near its mouth

- Mouth location in Kamchatka Krai

Physical characteristics
- Source
  - location: Kolyma Mountains
  - coordinates: 64.9119°N 163.5227°E
  - elevation: 738 m (2,421 ft)
- Mouth: Sea of Okhotsk
  - location: Penzhina Bay
  - coordinates: 62°28′21″N 165°8′12″E
- Length: 713 km (443 mi)
- Basin size: 73,500 km^{2} (28,400 sq mi)
- Discharge
  - average: 695 m^{3}/s (24,500 cu ft/s)

The Penzhina (Russian: Пенжина; Koryak: Мыгыкивэем) is a river in Kamchatka Krai, Russia. It is 713 kilometres (443 mi) long, and has a drainage basin of 73,500 square kilometres (28,400 sq mi).

The name "Penzhina" originated the Chukchi word "Pennyn", meaning "place of attack". In Koryak it is known as "Wegykiveem" (Мыгыкивэем), meaning "stormy river".

== Course ==
The source of the Penzhina is in the Kolyma Mountains, and it flows eastwards across the Ichigem Range. After bending southwards it enters a wide floodplain filled with lakes, finally flowing into the Penzhina Bay of the Sea of Okhotsk.

The villages of Kamenskoye, Oklan, Slautnoye and Ayanka are located by the river, as well as the seaport of Manily.

Its main tributaries are the Shayboveyem, Kondyreva and Oklan from the right, and the Ayanka, Chyornaya and Belaya from the left.

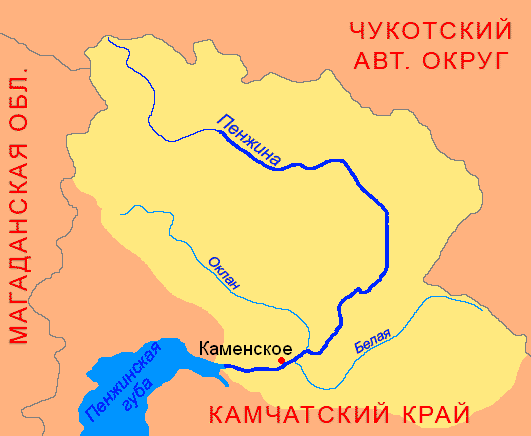
Basin of the Penzhina with its two main tributaries

== Flora and fauna ==
Among the fish species in the river the Far Eastern brook lamprey, Pacific lamprey, pike, chir, Kamchatka grayling, pink salmon, chum salmon, coho salmon, Dolly Varden trout, kundzha, Levanidov char and burbot deserve mention.

== See also ==
- List of rivers of Russia
