= Kamchatka constituency =

Russian legislative constituency

Kamchatka single-member constituency
- Constituency of the Russian State Duma

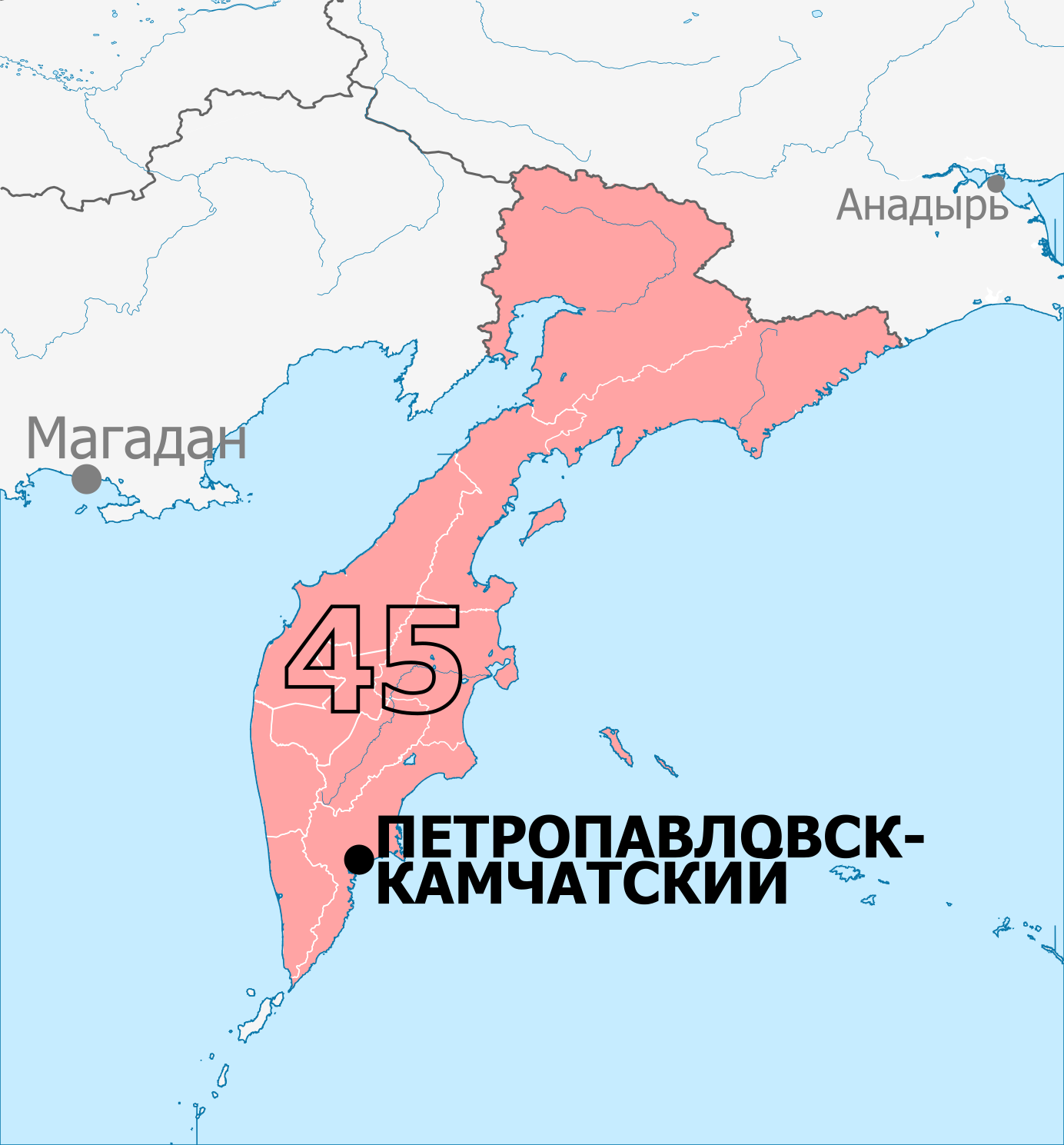
- Constituency boundaries since 2016
- Deputy: Irina Yarovaya; United Russia
- Federal subject: Kamchatka Krai
- Districts: Aleutsky, Bystrinsky, Karaginsky, Milkovsky, Olyutorsky, Penzhinsky, Petropavlovsk-Kamchatsky, Sobolevsky, Tigilsky, Ust-Bolsheretsky, Ust-Kamchatsky, Vilyuchinsk, Yelizovo, Yelizovsky
- Voters: 222,745 (2026)

The Kamchatka constituency (No.48 (Note: No.88 in 1993-1995 and 2003-2007, No.87 in 1995-2003, No.45 in 2016–2026)) is a Russian legislative constituency in Kamchatka Krai. The constituency encompasses the entire territory of Kamchatka Krai.

The constituency has been represented since 2021 by United Russia deputy Irina Yarovaya, five-term State Duma member and former prosecutor, who won the open seat, succeeding one-term United Russia incumbent Konstantin Slyshchenko. Yarovaya has served as First Deputy Chairwoman of the State Duma since September 2026.

== Boundaries ==
1993–2007: Aleutsky District, Bystrinsky District, Milkovsky District, Petropavlovsk-Kamchatsky, Sobolevsky District, Ust-Bolsheretsky District, Ust-Kamchatsky District, Vilyuchinsk, Vulkanny, Yelizovsky District
The constituency has been covering the entirety of Kamchatka Oblast since its initial creation in 1993.

2016–present: Aleutsky District, Bystrinsky District, Karaginsky District, Milkovsky District, Olyutorsky District, Penzhinsky District, Petropavlovsk-Kamchatsky, Sobolevsky District, Tigilsky District, Ust-Bolsheretsky District, Ust-Kamchatsky District, Vilyuchinsk, Yelizovo, Yelizovsky District
The constituency was re-created for the 2016 election in Kamchatka Krai which was created by the merger of Kamchatka Oblast and Koryak Autonomous Okrug in 2007. The constituency retained all of its former territory and gained the entirety of the dissolved Koryak constituency.

== Members elected ==
Election	Member	Party
1993	Aivars Lezdiņš	Independent
1995	Mikhail Zadornov (Note: appointed Minister of Finance in November 1997)	Yabloko
1998	Aleksandr Zaveryukha	Independent
1999	A by-election was scheduled after Against all line received the most votes	
2000	Valery Dorogin	Independent
2003	Viktor Zavarzin	Independent
2007	Proportional representation - no election by constituency	
2011	Proportional representation - no election by constituency	
2016	Konstantin Slyshchenko	United Russia
2021	Irina Yarovaya	United Russia
2026	Irina Yarovaya	United Russia

== Election results ==
=== 1993 ===
==== Declared candidates ====
- Ivan Dankulinets (Independent), chief of Petropavlovsk-Kamchatsky militsiya (1990–present), former Member of Kamchatka Oblast Council of People's Deputies (1990–1993)
- Stanislav Demeshchenko (LDPR), freight forwarder
- Aivars Lezdiņš (Independent), television channel director, political commentator
- Valery Pilipenko (Kedr), Institute of Volcanology and Seismology researcher
- Sergey Sharov (Independent), shipyard director
- Aleksandr Zemtsov (YaBL), Pacific Ocean Oceanological Institute researcher

==== Results ====
Summary of the 12 December 1993 Russian legislative election in the Kamchatka constituency
Candidate	Party	Votes	%
Aivars Lezdiņš	Independent	34,222	27.58%
Sergey Sharov	Independent	21,463	17.30%
Ivan Dankulinets	Independent	15,641	12.61%
Aleksandr Zemtsov	Yavlinsky–Boldyrev–Lukin	7,891	6.36%
Stanislav Demeshchenko	Liberal Democratic Party	5,731	4.62%
Valery Pilipenko	Kedr	2,764	2.23%
against all		28,754	23.18%
Total		124,064	100%

=== 1995 ===
==== Declared candidates ====
- Igor Belozertsev (Independent), Member of Legislative Assembly of Kamchatka Oblast (1995–present), military base deputy commander, Russian Navy captain 1st rank
- Yury Eitigon (Forward, Russia!), paramedic
- Valery Garnovsky (Independent), economist
- Lyudmila Grigoryeva (Independent), Member of Federation Council (1994–present), Deputy Head of the Central Bank of Russia Regional Office (1991–present)
- Sergey Grishin (Independent), journalist
- Vladimir Korneyev (LDPR), party journalist
- Boris Oleynikov (Independent), rector of Petropavlovsk-Kamchatsky Higher Engineering Marine School (1986–present)
- Nina Solodyakova (Independent), First Deputy Chairwoman of the Legislative Assembly of Kamchatka Oblast (1995–present), former People's Deputy of Russia (1990–1993)
- Yekaterina Temchura (Independent), Deputy Head of the Kamchatka Oblast Department of Social Protection
- Viktor Yershov (Independent), Chief State Labor Inspector of Kamchatka Oblast, former Member of Kamchatka Oblast Council of People's Deputies (1990–1993)
- Mikhail Zadornov (Yabloko), Member of State Duma (1994–present), Chairman of the Duma Committee on Budget, Taxes, Banks, and Finance (1994–present)

==== Withdrawn candidates ====
- Aleksey Nefedov (Independent), Inspector General of the Ministry of Defense of Russia, Russian Army lieutenant general

==== Declined ====
- Aivars Lezdiņš (Independent), incumbent Member of State Duma (1994–present)

==== Results ====
Summary of the 17 December 1995 Russian legislative election in the Kamchatka constituency
Candidate	Party	Votes	%
Mikhail Zadornov	Yabloko	36,892	22.28%
Boris Oleynikov	Independent	23,955	14.47%
Nina Solodyakova	Independent	20,261	12.24%
Yekaterina Temchura	Independent	19,486	11.77%
Lyudmila Grigoryeva	Independent	13,146	7.94%
Vladimir Korneyev	Liberal Democratic Party	8,165	4.93%
Igor Belozertsev	Independent	8,020	4.84%
Viktor Yershov	Independent	7,474	4.51%
Sergey Grishin	Independent	6,119	3.70%
Yury Eitigon	Forward, Russia!	2,635	1.59%
Valery Garnovsky	Independent	1,741	1.05%
against all		15,262	9.22%
Total		165,578	100%

=== 1998 ===
==== Declared candidates ====
- Yury Golenishchev (Independent), Member of Kamchatka Oblast Council of People's Deputies (1995–present)
- Pyotr Ivanov (Independent)
- Kantemir Karamzin (Independent), entrepreneur
- Vyacheslav Lazarchuk (Independent)
- Vadim Maksimov (Independent)
- Vladimir Obukhov (Independent), fishing businessman
- Olga Sopova (Independent)
- Vladislav Shved (Independent), former Member of Supreme Soviet of Lithuania (1990–1991), State Duma staffer
- Aleksandr Zaveryukha (Independent), former Deputy Prime Minister of Russia (1993–1997), former Member of State Duma (1994–1995)

==== Results ====
Summary of the 19 April 1998 by-election in the Kamchatka constituency
Candidate	Party	Votes	%
Aleksandr Zaveryukha	Independent	16,092	20.17%
Vladislav Shved	Independent	14,213	17.81%
Yury Golenishchev	Independent	10,803	13.54%
Vladimir Obukhov	Independent	5,233	6.56%
Olga Sopova	Independent	4,751	5.95%
Kantemir Karamzin	Independent	3,468	4.35%
Vadim Maksimov	Independent	3,024	3.79%
Vyacheslav Lazarchuk	Independent	2,131	2.67%
Pyotr Ivanov	Independent	1,567	1.96%
against all		16,054	20.12%
Total		57,958	100%

=== 1999 ===
==== Declared candidates ====
- Aleksandr Bikbulatov (Independent), Member of Yelizovsky District Duma
- Vladimir Boltenko (Independent), Presidential Envoy to Kamchatka Oblast (1998–present)
- Olga Chirkova (Independent), Petropavlovsk-Kamchatsky city children's polyclinic chief doctor
- Ivan Dankulinets (Independent), Member of Kamchatka Oblast Council of People's Deputies (1997–present), Deputy Chief of Kamchatka Oblast Militsiya (1996–present), militsiya colonel, 1993 candidate for this seat
- Valery Dorogin (OVR), Commander of the Northeastern Group of Troops and Forces (1995–present), Russian Navy vice admiral
- Yury Golenishchev (CPRF), Member of Kamchatka Oblast Council of People's Deputies (1995–present), 1998 candidate for this seat
- Aleksey Gurkin (Independent), trust management specialist
- Kantemir Karamzin (Independent), law firm director, 1998 candidate for this seat
- Valery Kim (Independent), Member of Kamchatka Oblast Council of People's Deputies (1997–present), printing house director
- Pavel Mukhortov (Independent), writer, retired cosmonaut
- Sergey Pavlov (Independent), Member of Kamchatka Oblast Council of People's Deputies (1997–present)
- Aleksandr Pukalo (Independent), fishing businessman
- Vladimir Semchev (Independent), Member of Kamchatka Oblast Council of People's Deputies (1997–present), thermal power plant director
- Vladislav Shved (Independent), former Member of Supreme Soviet of Lithuania (1990–1991), chief of staff to the State Duma Committee on Labor and Social Policy, 1998 candidate for this seat
- Irina Yarovaya (Yabloko), Member of Kamchatka Oblast Council of People's Deputies (1997–present)
- Viktor Yershov (Independent), Chief State Labor Inspector of Kamchatka Oblast, former Member of Kamchatka Oblast Council of People's Deputies (1990–1993), 1995 candidate for this seat
- Valery Zimnukhov (DN), chief of staff to the Russian-American University

==== Withdrawn candidates ====
- Iskander Khakimov (Independent), former press secretary of the Governor of Kamchatka Oblast (1991–1992), journalist
- Vladimir Novikov (NDR), First Deputy Chairman of the Kamchatka Oblast Council of People's Deputies (1997–present), Member of the Council of People's Deputies (1995–present)

==== Did not file ====
- Vitaly Bondarenko (Independent)
- Igor Buller (Independent)
- Sergey Grishin (Independent), chairman of the Russian National Unity regional office, 1995 candidate for this seat
- Stanislav Konchakov (Independent)
- Nikolay Kovalenko (Independent)
- Sergey Maksimov (Independent)
- Aleksey Petrov (Independent)
- Aleksandr Shershakov (Independent)
- Tatyana Tableva (Independent)
- Yury Volchok (Independent)

==== Declined ====
- Aleksandr Zaveryukha (NDR), incumbent Member of State Duma (1994–1995, 1998–present) (ran in the Orenburg constituency)

==== Results ====
A by-election was scheduled after Against all line received the most votes.

Summary of the 19 December 1999 Russian legislative election in the Kamchatka constituency
Candidate	Party	Votes	%
Yury Golenishchev	Communist Party	22,022	14.41%
Vladimir Boltenko	Independent	21,958	14.37%
Valery Dorogin	Fatherland – All Russia	19,451	12.73%
Irina Yarovaya	Yabloko	16,695	10.93%
Valery Kim	Independent	6,360	4.16%
Viktor Yershov	Independent	5,978	3.91%
Olga Chirkova	Independent	5,224	3.42%
Sergey Pavlov	Independent	5,153	3.37%
Aleksandr Pukalo	Independent	4,870	3.19%
Kantemir Karamzin	Independent	4,538	2.97%
Vladislav Shved	Independent	3,703	2.42%
Vladimir Semchev	Independent	3,563	2.33%
Ivan Dankulinets	Independent	3,230	2.11%
Aleksey Gurkin	Independent	1,782	1.17%
Aleksandr Bikbulatov	Independent	1,493	0.98%
Valery Zimnukhov	Spiritual Heritage	311	0.20%
Pavel Mukhortov	Independent	214	0.14%
against all		24,163	15.81%
Total		152,805	100%

=== 2000 ===
==== Declared candidates ====
- Anatoly Ababko (Independent), former People's Deputy of Russia (1990–1993)
- Vladimir Boltenko (Independent), former Presidential Envoy to Kamchatka Oblast (1998–1999), 1999 candidate for this seat
- Valery Dorogin (Independent), Commander of the Northeastern Group of Troops and Forces (1995–present), Russian Navy vice admiral, 1999 candidate for this seat
- Yury Golenishchev (Independent), Member of Kamchatka Oblast Council of People's Deputies (1995–present), 1998 and 1999 candidate for this seat
- Aleksey Kazantsev (Independent)
- Vyacheslav Koroteyev (Independent)
- Nikolay Pegin (Independent), corporate executive
- Irina Yarovaya (Independent), Member of Kamchatka Oblast Council of People's Deputies (1997–present), 1999 candidate for this seat

==== Results ====
Summary of the 26 March 2000 by-election in the Kamchatka constituency
Candidate	Party	Votes	%
Valery Dorogin	Independent	45,693	27.60%
Yury Golenishchev	Independent	33,215	20.06%
Vladimir Boltenko	Independent	32,367	19.55%
Irina Yarovaya	Independent	15,987	9.66%
Aleksey Kazantsev	Independent	5,925	3.58%
Nikolay Pegin	Independent	4,539	2.74%
Vyacheslav Koroteyev	Independent	1,737	1.05%
Anatoly Ababko	Independent	743	0.45%
against all		23,028	13.91%
Total		165,543	100%

=== 2003 ===
==== Declared candidates ====
- Nadezhda Balyulina (KPE), middle school teacher
- Dmitry Bobrovskikh (ORP Rus'), businessman
- Svyatoslav Chayka (Independent), Member of Kamchatka Oblast Council of People's Deputies (2001–present)
- Vladimir Chayko (Independent), Member of Kamchatka Oblast Council of People's Deputies (1997–present), medical businessman
- Valery Dorogin (VR–ES), incumbent Member of State Duma (2000–present), 2000 gubernatorial candidate
- Viktor Kravchenko (Independent), corporate executive
- Aleksandr Nikitin (APR), brewery director
- Vladimir Shumanin (Independent), construction executive, 2000 gubernatorial candidate
- Mikhail Yekimov (LDPR), coordinator of the party regional office
- Irina Yarovaya (Yabloko), Member of Kamchatka Oblast Council of People's Deputies (1997–present), 1999 and 2000 candidate for this seat
- Viktor Zavarzin (Independent), First Deputy Chief of Staff of the Staff for Coordinating Military Cooperation of the Commonwealth of Independent States (1997–present), Russian Army colonel general

==== Did not file ====
- Aleksandr Dolzhenkov (Independent), state marine bioresources inspector
- Aleksandr Ivanov (Independent), journalist
- Konstantin Kuldasov (SPS), businessman
- Aleksandra Maltseva (Independent), pensioner
- Aleksandr Megesh (Independent), Petropavlovsk-Kamchatsky administration official
- Zaidulla Nigmatullin (Independent), energy executive
- Aleksandr Shershakov (Independent), pensioner, 1999 candidate for this seat

==== Results ====
Summary of the 7 December 2003 Russian legislative election in the Kamchatka constituency
Candidate	Party	Votes	%
Viktor Zavarzin	Independent	33,713	24.88%
Valery Dorogin (incumbent)	Great Russia – Eurasian Union	31,841	23.50%
Irina Yarovaya	Yabloko	27,548	20.33%
Viktor Kravchenko	Independent	7,395	5.46%
Svyatoslav Chayka	Independent	5,190	3.83%
Mikhail Yekimov	Liberal Democratic Party	4,383	3.23%
Dmitry Bobrovskikh	United Russian Party Rus'	2,933	2.16%
Aleksandr Nikitin	Agrarian Party	2,270	1.68%
Vladimir Chayko	Independent	2,181	1.61%
Nadezhda Balyulina	Conceptual Party "Unity"	1,797	1.33%
Vladimir Shumanin	Independent	1,633	1.21%
against all		13,572	10.02%
Total		135,639	100%

=== 2016 ===
==== Declared candidates ====
- Vladimir Elchaparov (Yabloko), marine biology researcher
- Valery Kalashnikov (LDPR), Member of Petropavlovsk-Kamchatsky City Duma (2012–present), municipal parking director, 2015 gubernatorial candidate
- Mikhail Mashkovtsev (CPCR), former Governor of Kamchatka Oblast (2000–2007)
- Mikhail Puchkovsky (A Just Russia), Member of Legislative Assembly of Kamchatka Krai (2011–present), 2015 gubernatorial candidate
- Konstantin Slyshchenko (United Russia), Head of Petropavlovsk-Kamchatsky – Chairman of the City Duma (2012–present), Member of the City Duma (2006–present)
- Mikhail Smagin (CPRF), Member of Legislative Assembly of Kamchatka Krai (2011–present), aide to State Duma member Pavel Dorokhin, 2015 gubernatorial candidate

==== Withdrawn candidates ====
- Aleksandr Ostrikov (Patriots of Russia), former Member of Legislative Assembly of Kamchatka Krai (2007–2011), construction businessman, 2015 gubernatorial candidate

==== Failed to qualify ====
- Vyacheslav Dubyansky (Independent), pensioner

==== Declined ====
- Tikhon Shpilenok (United Russia), director of the Kronotsky Nature Reserve (2009–present) (lost the primary)
- Irina Yarovaya (United Russia), Member of State Duma (2007–present), Chairwoman of the Duma Committee on Safety and Anti-Corruption (2011–present) (won the primary, ran on the party list)

==== Results ====
Summary of the 18 September 2016 Russian legislative election in the Kamchatka constituency
Candidate	Party	Votes	%
Konstantin Slyshchenko	United Russia	35,322	38.35%
Valery Kalashnikov	Liberal Democratic Party	19,929	21.64%
Mikhail Smagin	Communist Party	10,028	10.89%
Mikhail Mashkovtsev	Communists of Russia	9,747	10.58%
Mikhail Puchkovsky	A Just Russia	7,219	7.84%
Vladimir Elchaparov	Yabloko	3,000	3.26%
Total		92,094	100%

=== 2021 ===
==== Declared candidates ====
- Dmitry Bobrovskikh (SR–ZP), entrepreneur, 2003 ORP Rus' candidate for this seat, 2004 and 2020 gubernatorial candidate
- Valery Kalashnikov (LDPR), Member of Legislative Assembly of Kamchatka Krai (2016–present), 2015 and 2020 gubernatorial candidate, 2016 candidate for this seat
- Viktor Khomyakov (RPPSS), former advisor to Governor of Kamchatka Krai Vladimir Ilyukhin (2012–2020), retired police officer
- Roman Litvinov (CPRF), Member of Legislative Assembly of Kamchatka Krai (2016–present), aide to State Duma member Vladimir Pozdnyakov
- Irina Yarovaya (United Russia), Deputy Chairwoman of the State Duma (2016–present), Member of State Duma (2007–present), 1999, 2000 and 2003 Yabloko candidate for this seat
- Yekaterina Zaytseva (New People), individual entrepreneur, former journalist

==== Failed to qualify ====
- Yekaterina Rasputina (Independent), aide to State Duma member Konstantin Slyshchenko

==== Declined ====
- Konstantin Slyshchenko (United Russia), incumbent Member of State Duma (2016–present) (withdrew from the primary)

==== Results ====
Summary of the 17-19 September 2021 Russian legislative election in the Kamchatka constituency
Candidate	Party	Votes	%
Irina Yarovaya	United Russia	37,070	40.43%
Roman Litvinov	Communist Party	17,470	19.05%
Valery Kalashnikov	Liberal Democratic Party	10,589	11.55%
Yekaterina Zaytseva	New People	9,728	10.61%
Dmitry Bobrovskikh	A Just Russia — For Truth	8,584	9.36%
Viktor Khomyakov	Party of Pensioners	3,878	4.23%
Total		91,692	100%

=== 2026 ===
==== Declared candidates ====
- Roman Litvinov (CPRF), Member of Legislative Assembly of Kamchatka Krai (2016–present), 2021 candidate for this seat, 2025 gubernatorial candidate
- Aleksey Nikolayev (A Just Russia), community activist, 2015 CPCR, 2020 and 2025 Independent gubernatorial candidate
- Vladimir Smolin (LDPR), Mayor of Vulkanny (2005–present)
- Irina Yarovaya (United Russia), Deputy Chairwoman of the State Duma (2016–present), incumbent Member of State Duma (2007–present)

==== Did not file ====
- Sergey Kuzminitsky (Independent), pensioner

==== Results ====
Summary of the 18-20 September 2026 Russian legislative election in the Kamchatka constituency
Candidate	Party	Votes	%
Irina Yarovaya (incumbent)	United Russia	75,659	71.79%
Roman Litvinov	Communist Party	12,321	11.69%
Vladimir Smolin	Liberal Democratic Party	7,298	6.92%
Aleksey Nikolayev	A Just Russia	6,834	6.48%
Total		105,396	100%
