= 2025 Kamchatka Krai gubernatorial election =

- 12–14 September 2025
- Turnout: 46.48% ▲9.37 pp
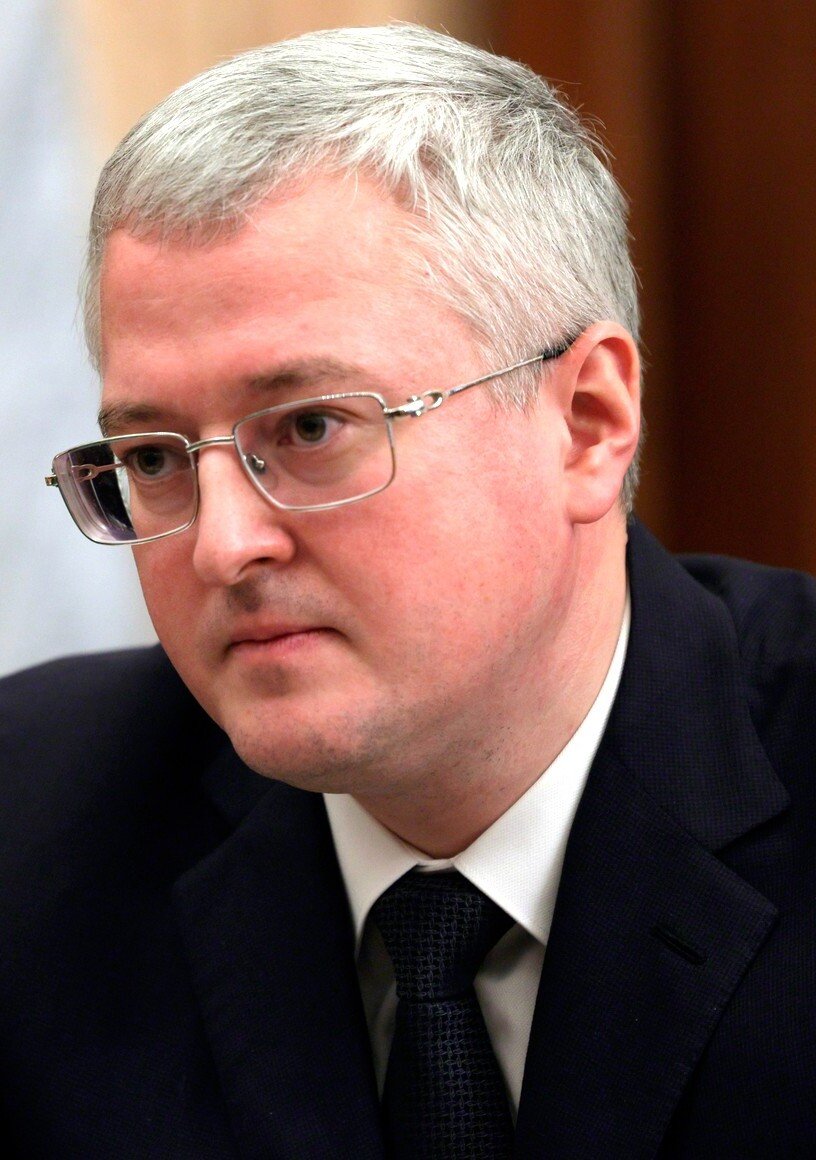

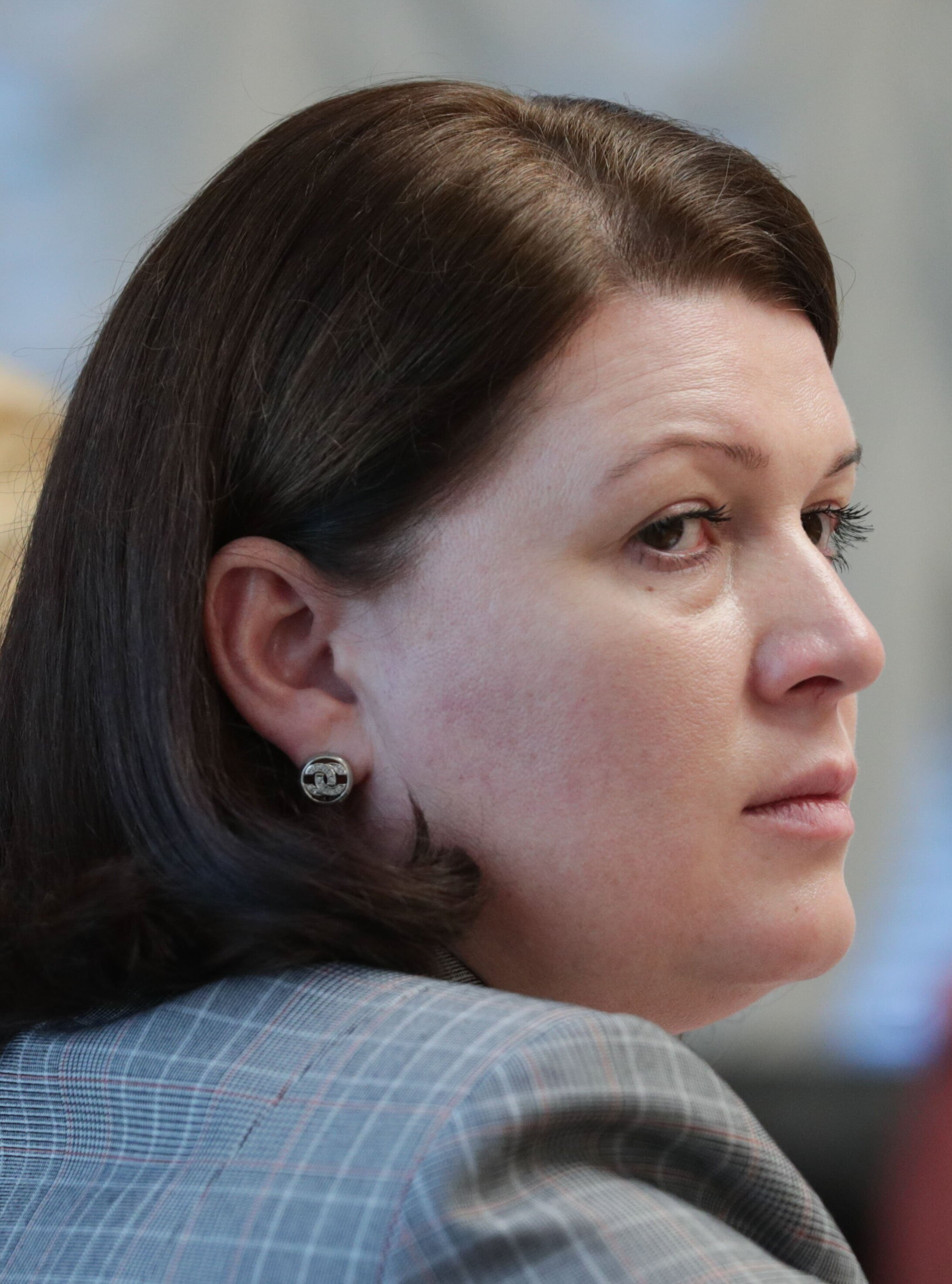

| Candidate | Vladimir Solodov | Vasilina Kuliyeva |
| Party | United Russia | LDPR |
| Popular vote | 67,820 | 14,885 |
| Percentage | 62.97% | 13.82% |
| | | CPCR |
| Candidate | Roman Litvinov | Dmitry Tyurin |
| Party | CPRF | Communists of Russia |
| Popular vote | 14,321 | 5,526 |
| Percentage | 13.30% | 5.13% |
- Results by raions and cities
Governor before election
Vladimir Solodov
United Russia
Governor-elect
Vladimir Solodov
United Russia

The 2025 Kamchatka Krai gubernatorial election took place on 12–14 September 2025, on common election day. Incumbent Governor of Kamchatka Krai Vladimir Solodov was re-elected to a second term in office.

== Background ==
Vladimir Solodov, then-Chairman of the Government of Yakutia, was appointed acting governor of Kamchatka Krai in April 2020, replacing two-term incumbent Vladimir Ilyukhin. Ilyukhin left after poor handling of the COVID-19 pandemic, for which he was criticised by Rospotrebnadzor head Anna Popova and State Duma member Yevgeny Revenko. Solodov ran for a full term as an independent with United Russia support and won the election with 80.51% of the vote.

In November 2023 during a live translation Solodov publicly announced his intention to seek a second term in office. In November 2024 Governor Solodov joined United Russia party. In February 2025 during a meeting with President Vladimir Putin Governor Solodov announced his intention to run for a second term and received Putin's endorsement.

== Candidates ==
In Kamchatka Krai candidates for Governor of Kamchatka Krai can be nominated by registered political parties or by self-nomination. Candidate for Governor of Kamchatka Krai should be a Russian citizen and at least 30 years old. Candidates for Governor of Kamchatka Krai should not have a foreign citizenship or residence permit. Each candidate in order to be registered is required to collect at least 10% of signatures of members and heads of municipalities. In addition, self-nominated candidates should collect 2% of signatures of Kamchatka Krai residents. Also gubernatorial candidates present 3 candidacies to the Federation Council and election winner later appoints one of the presented candidates.

=== Declared ===
| Candidate name, political party | | Occupation | Status | Ref. |
|---|---|---|---|---|
| Vasilina Kuliyeva; Liberal Democratic Party | Vasilina Kuliyeva | Member of State Duma (2011–2012, 2016–2021, 2023–present); 2013 Zabaykalsky Krai gubernatorial candidate | Registered | |
| Roman Litvinov; Communist Party | Roman Litvinov | Member of Legislative Assembly of Kamchatka Krai (2016–present) | Registered | |
| Vladimir Solodov; United Russia | Vladimir Solodov | Incumbent Governor of Kamchatka Krai (2020–present) | Registered | |
| Dmitry Tyurin; Communists of Russia | | Lawyer | Registered | |
| Yegor Bukhanov; Independent | | Housing and utility services executive | Failed to qualify | |
| Alyona Didenko; Independent | | Water utilities employee | Failed to qualify | |
| Aleksey Nikolayev; Independent | | Activist; 2015 Communists of Russia gubernatorial candidate 2020 gubernatorial candidate | Failed to qualify | |
| Dmitry Avdeyev; Independent | | Cultural director | Did not file | |
| Leonid Kalyayev; Independent | | Middle school deputy principal | Did not file | |
| Natalya Kolgina; Independent | | Lyceum principal | Did not file | |
| Yevgeny Miroshnichenko; Independent | | Dentist | Did not file | |
| Dmitry Pirozhnikov; Independent | | Water utility executive | Did not file | |
| Natalya Teterevkova; Party of Pensioners | | Member of Petropavlovsk-Kamchatsky City Duma (2022–present); Russian Red Cross Society regional director | Did not file | |

=== Declined ===
- Valery Kalashnikov (LDPR), Member of Legislative Assembly of Kamchatka Krai (2016–present), 2015 and 2020 gubernatorial candidate
- Aleksandra Novikova (SR–ZP), Member of Legislative Assembly of Kamchatka Krai (2021–present)

=== Candidates for Federation Council ===
| Head candidate, political party | Candidates for Federation Council | Status |
|---|---|---|
| Vasilina Kuliyeva; Liberal Democratic Party | * Valery Kalashnikov, Member of Legislative Assembly of Kamchatka Krai (2016–present), 2015 and 2020 gubernatorial candidate * Vasily Kolyadka, Member of Petropavlovsk-Kamchatsky City Duma (2017–present), aide to State Duma member Arkady Svistunov * Irina Rykova, Member of Petropavlovsk-Kamchatsky City Duma (2012–2017, 2022–present), school principal | Registered |
| Roman Litvinov; Communist Party | * Lyubov Lazutkina, Member of Legislative Assembly of Kamchatka Krai (2021–present) * Valery Matveyenko, party secretary * Galina Pesotskaya, Member of Petropavlovsk-Kamchatsky City Duma (2022–present), aide to State Duma member Nikolay Kharitonov | Registered |
| Vladimir Solodov; United Russia | * Svetlana Galante, former Member of Legislative Assembly of Kamchatka Krai (2011–2021), 1996 Olympic judoka * Nadezhda Gogoleva, Member of Civic Chamber of Kamchatka Krai (2024–present), military base club chief * Boris Nevzorov, incumbent Senator (2011–present) | Registered |
| Dmitry Tyurin; Communists of Russia | * Maksim Chaly, military base security guard * Oksana Murzina, children musical school principal * Vladislav Pavlov, water utility engineer | Registered |

== Finances ==
All sums are in rubles.

| Financial Report | Source | Avdeyev | Bukhanov | Didenko | Kalyayev | Kolgina | Kuliyeva | Litvinov | Miroshnichenko | Nikolayev | Pirozhnikov | Solodov | Teterevkova | Tyurin |
|---|---|---|---|---|---|---|---|---|---|---|---|---|---|---|
| First | | 75,000 | 4,570,000 | 29,000 | 1,745,000 | 50,000 | 130,000 | 400,000 | 120,000 | 5,000 | 1,580,000 | 26,357,150 | 100,000 | 14,475,000 |
| Final | | 75,000 | 4,570,000 | 29,000 | 1,745,000 | 50,000 | 15,130,000 | 1,150,000 | 120,000 | 5,000 | 1,580,000 | 40,000,000 | 100,000 | 26,910,000 |

== Polls ==
| Fieldwork date | Polling firm | Solodov | Kuliyeva | Litvinov | Tyurin | None | Lead |
|---|---|---|---|---|---|---|---|
| 14 September 2025 | 2025 election | 63.0 | 13.8 | 13.3 | 5.1 | 4.8 | 49.2 |
| March – August 2025 | INSOMAR | 59 | 12 | 17 | 8 | 4 | 42 |

== Results ==
Summary of the 12–14 September 2025 Kamchatka Krai gubernatorial election results
| Candidate | Party | Votes | % |
|---|---|---|---|
| Vladimir Solodov (incumbent) | United Russia | 67,820 | 62.97 |
| Vasilina Kuliyeva | Liberal Democratic Party | 14,885 | 13.82 |
| Roman Litvinov | Communist Party | 14,321 | 13.30 |
| Dmitry Tyurin | Communists of Russia | 5,526 | 5.13 |
| Valid votes | | 102,552 | 95.21 |
| Blank ballots | | 5,154 | 4.79 |
| Total | | 107,706 | 100.00 |
| Turnout | | 107,706 | 46.48 |
| Registered voters | | 231,736 | 100.00 |

Governor Solodov re-appointed incumbent Senator Boris Nevzorov (United Russia) to the Federation Council.

== See also ==
- 2025 Russian regional elections
