= 2026 Kamchatka Krai legislative election =

Regional legislative election in Russia

- 18–20 September 2026

All 28 seats in the Legislative Assembly 15 seats needed for a majority
- Turnout: 47.60% ▲7.54 pp

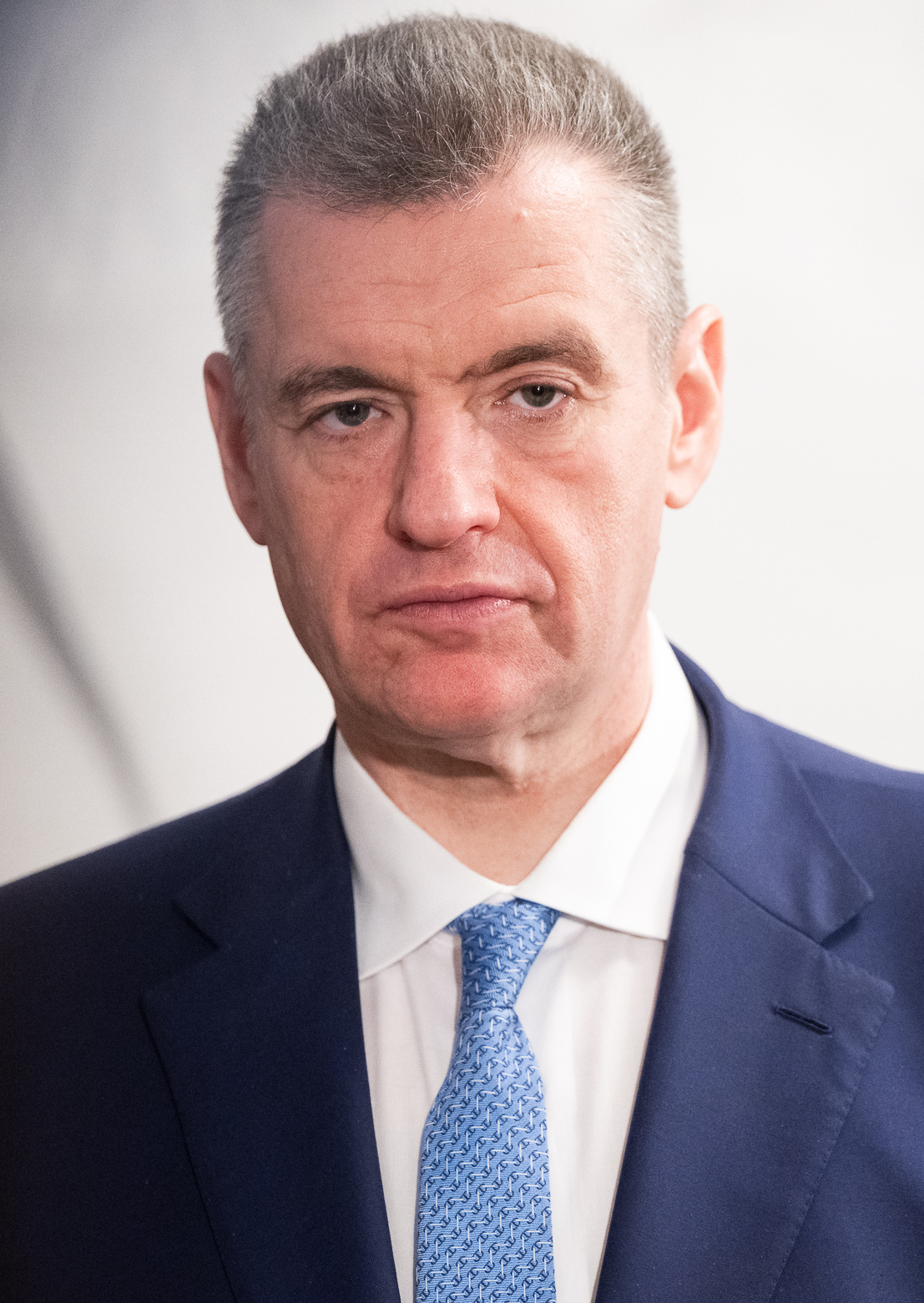

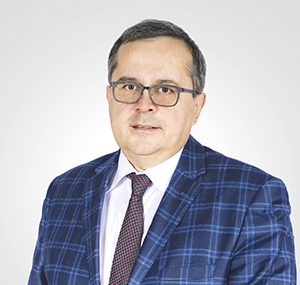
	Majority party	Minority party	Third party
	ER
Candidate	Svetlana Galante	Roman Litvinov	Leonid Slutsky
Party	United Russia	CPRF	LDPR
Last election	34.74%, 18 seats	23.21%, 5 seats	11.66%, 1 seat
Seats won	24	1	1
Seat change	▲6	▼4	Steady
Popular vote	59,858	14,466	10,146
Percentage	56.35%	13.62%	9.55%
Swing	▲21.61 pp	▼9.59 pp	▼2.11 pp
	Fourth party	Fifth party	Sixth party
	NL	SR
Candidate	Darya Suchilina	Aleksandra Novikova	Erik Prazdnikov
Party	New People	A Just Russia	Party of Pensioners
Last election	10.33%, 1 seat	8.42%, 1 seat	5.15%, 1 seat
Seats won	1	1	0
Seat change	Steady	Steady	▼1
Popular vote	7,324	6,860	4,702
Percentage	6.90%	6.46%	4.43%
Swing	▼3.43 pp	▼1.96 pp	▼0.72 pp
Chairman before election
Andrey Kopylov (acting)
United Russia
Elected Chairman
Sergey Merkulov
United Russia
Senator before election
Valery Ponomarev
United Russia
Senator after election
Valery Ponomarev
United Russia

The 2026 Legislative Assembly of Kamchatka Krai election took place on 18–20 September 2026, on common election day, coinciding with the 2026 Russian legislative election. All 28 seats in the Legislative Assembly were up for re-election.

United Russia increased its majority in the Legislative Assembly, winning 56.4% of the vote and all 14 single-mandate constituencies. Communist Party of the Russian Federation lost more than third of its vote share and four seats, retaining a single deputy. Liberal Democratic Party of Russia, New People and A Just Russia all saw their vote shares drop but retained one-member factions. Russian Party of Pensioners for Social Justice received less than 5% of the vote and lost its faction in the Legislative Assembly.

== Electoral system ==
Under current election laws, the Legislative Assembly is elected for a term of five years, with parallel voting. 14 seats are elected by party-list proportional representation with a 5% electoral threshold, with the other half elected in 14 single-member constituencies by first-past-the-post voting. Seats in the proportional part are allocated using the Imperiali quota, modified to ensure that every party list, which passes the threshold, receives at least one mandate.

== Candidates ==
=== Party lists ===
To register regional lists of candidates, parties need to collect 0.5% of signatures of all registered voters in Kamchatka Krai.

The following parties were relieved from the necessity to collect signatures:

- United Russia
- Communist Party of the Russian Federation
- Liberal Democratic Party of Russia
- A Just Russia
- New People
- Russian Party of Pensioners for Social Justice

№	Party	Krai-wide list	Candidates	Territorial groups	Status
1	A Just Russia	Aleksandra Novikova • Aleksey Nikolayev	37	12	Registered
2	United Russia	Svetlana Galante • Valery Ponomarev • Sergey Merkulov • Sergey Lebedev • Yevgeny Mishchenko	54	14	Registered
3	Communist Party	Roman Litvinov • Rais Gumerov	38	12	Registered
4	Liberal Democratic Party	Leonid Slutsky • Vladimir Smolin • Valery Kalashnikov	51	14	Registered
5	Party of Pensioners	Erik Prazdnikov • Natalya Teterevkova • Irina Suslova	30	9	Registered
6	New People	Darya Suchilina • Roman Prussky • Olga Gural	27	8	Registered

Communists of Russia, which participated in the last election, did not file.

=== Single-mandate constituencies ===
14 single-mandate constituencies were formed in Kamchatka Krai. To register candidates in single-mandate constituencies need to collect 3% of signatures of registered voters in the constituency.

Number of candidates in single-mandate constituencies
Party	Candidates	
Party	Nominated	Registered
United Russia	14	14
Communist Party	9	8
Liberal Democratic Party	13	12
A Just Russia	14	12
Independent	3	1
Total	53	47

== Results ==
=== Results by party lists ===
Summary of the 18–20 September 2026 Legislative Assembly of Kamchatka Krai election results
Party	Party list					Constituency		Total	
Party	Votes	%	±pp	Seats	+/–	Seats	+/–	Seats	+/–
United Russia	59,858	56.35	▲21.61	10	▲4	14	▲2	24	▲6
Communist Party	14,466	13.62	▼9.59	1	▼3	0	▼1	1	▼4
Liberal Democratic Party	10,146	9.55	▼2.11	1	Steady	0	Steady	1	Steady
New People	7,324	6.90	▼3.43	1	Steady	–	–	1	Steady
A Just Russia	6,860	6.46	▼1.96	1	Steady	0	Steady	1	Steady
Party of Pensioners	4,702	4.43	▼0.72	0	▼1	–	–	0	▼1
Independent	–	–	–	–	–	0	Steady	0	Steady
Invalid ballots	2,865	2.70	▼1.27	—	—	—	—	—	—
Total	106,221	100.00	—	14	Steady	14	Steady	28	Steady
Turnout	106,221	47.60	▲7.54	—	—	—	—	—	—
Registered voters	223,157	100.00	—	—	—	—	—	—	—

Chief of Staff to the Governor of Kamchatka Krai Sergey Merkulov (United Russia) was elected Chairman of the Legislative Assembly, replacing outgoing acting Chairman Andrey Kopylov (United Russia). Kopylov retained his position as First Deputy Chairman of the Legislative Assembly. Incumbent Senator Valery Ponomarev (United Russia) was re-appointed to the Federation Council.

=== Results in single-member constituencies ===
==== District 1 ====
Summary of the 18–20 September 2026 Legislative Assembly of Kamchatka Krai election in District 1
Candidate	Party	Votes	%
Aleksandr Dolgunkov (incumbent)	United Russia	3,520	57.57%
Aleksandr Sevostyanov	Communist Party	926	15.15%
Irina Rykova	Liberal Democratic Party	857	14.02%
Andrey Kubanov	A Just Russia	563	9.21%
Total		6,114	100%

==== District 2 ====
Summary of the 18–20 September 2026 Legislative Assembly of Kamchatka Krai election in District 2
Candidate	Party	Votes	%
Yevgeny Novoselov	United Russia	4,018	65.56%
Yana Yermilina	A Just Russia	752	12.27%
Denis Chernomazov	Communist Party	630	10.28%
Viktor Pavlov	Liberal Democratic Party	488	7.96%
Total		6,129	100%

==== District 3 ====
Summary of the 18–20 September 2026 Legislative Assembly of Kamchatka Krai election in District 3
Candidate	Party	Votes	%
Aleksey Voytov	United Russia	3,615	55.77%
Valery Kalashnikov	Liberal Democratic Party	1,023	15.78%
Rais Gumerov	Communist Party	833	12.85%
Irina Golubeva	A Just Russia	674	10.40%
Total		6,482	100%

==== District 4 ====
Summary of the 18–20 September 2026 Legislative Assembly of Kamchatka Krai election in District 4
Candidate	Party	Votes	%
Dmitry Timofeyev (incumbent)	United Russia	3,982	63.65%
Vasily Kolyadka	Liberal Democratic Party	1,698	27.14%
Total		6,256	100%

==== District 5 ====
Summary of the 18–20 September 2026 Legislative Assembly of Kamchatka Krai election in District 5
Candidate	Party	Votes	%
Vladimir Ageyev (incumbent)	United Russia	4,529	68.10%
Anastasia Yashina	Liberal Democratic Party	977	14.69%
Violetta Nosova	A Just Russia	841	12.64%
Total		6,651	100%

==== District 6 ====
Summary of the 18–20 September 2026 Legislative Assembly of Kamchatka Krai election in District 6
Candidate	Party	Votes	%
Pavel Saydachakov	United Russia	3,184	54.49%
Aleksey Barkov	A Just Russia	1,985	33.97%
Total		5,843	100%

==== District 7 ====
Summary of the 18–20 September 2026 Legislative Assembly of Kamchatka Krai election in District 7
Candidate	Party	Votes	%
Rashid Shamoyan (incumbent)	United Russia	4,421	75.98%
Yelena Korol	Liberal Democratic Party	712	12.24%
Mikhail Galiyev	A Just Russia	442	7.60%
Total		5,819	100%

==== District 8 ====
Summary of the 18–20 September 2026 Legislative Assembly of Kamchatka Krai election in District 8
Candidate	Party	Votes	%
Svetlana Galante	United Russia	3,865	62.45%
Aleksandra Novikova (incumbent)	A Just Russia	1,285	20.76%
Yevgenia Dubinina	Liberal Democratic Party	730	11.80%
Total		6,189	100%

==== District 9 ====
Summary of the 18–20 September 2026 Legislative Assembly of Kamchatka Krai election in District 9
Candidate	Party	Votes	%
Anar Atlukhanov	United Russia	5,573	59.35%
Vladimir Makagonov	Communist Party	1,337	14.24%
Denis Sidorenko	Liberal Democratic Party	1,157	12.32%
Aleksey Kulishov	A Just Russia	1,026	10.93%
Total		9,390	100%

==== District 10 ====
Summary of the 18–20 September 2026 Legislative Assembly of Kamchatka Krai election in District 10
Candidate	Party	Votes	%
Sergey Tyulkin	United Russia	4,279	59.25%
Boris Stepa	Liberal Democratic Party	1,352	18.72%
Daniil Ionov	Communist Party	1,215	16.82%
Total		7,222	100%

==== District 11 ====
Summary of the 18–20 September 2026 Legislative Assembly of Kamchatka Krai election in District 11
Candidate	Party	Votes	%
Sergey Lozovsky (incumbent)	United Russia	4,309	60.42%
Oleg Tikhonov	Communist Party	955	13.39%
Vladimir Smolin	Liberal Democratic Party	871	12.21%
Yelena Voloshina	A Just Russia	679	9.52%
Total		7,132	100%

==== District 12 ====
Summary of the 18–20 September 2026 Legislative Assembly of Kamchatka Krai election in District 12
Candidate	Party	Votes	%
Viktor Sirotin	United Russia	4,007	45.76%
Svetlana Lebedeva	Liberal Democratic Party	1,743	19.91%
Ivan Sherstyuk	Communist Party	1,348	15.40%
Aleksey Nikolayev	A Just Russia	1,131	12.92%
Total		8,756	100%

==== District 13 ====
Summary of the 18–20 September 2026 Legislative Assembly of Kamchatka Krai election in District 13
Candidate	Party	Votes	%
Andrey Kopylov (incumbent)	United Russia	6,436	74.73%
Lyubov Lazutkina	Communist Party	1,354	15.72%
Aleksandr Sheykin	A Just Russia	457	5.31%
Total		8,612	100%

==== District 14 ====
Summary of the 18–20 September 2026 Legislative Assembly of Kamchatka Krai election in District 14
Candidate	Party	Votes	%
Tatyana Romanova (incumbent)	United Russia	3,013	53.61%
Karina Kozub	Liberal Democratic Party	883	15.71%
Ivan Syrbu	Independent	815	14.50%
Gennady Bedak	A Just Russia	571	10.16%
Total		5,620	100%

=== Members ===
Incumbent deputies are highlighted with bold, elected members who declined to take a seat are marked with ~~strikethrough~~.

Constituency
No.	Member	Party
1	Aleksandr Dolgunkov	United Russia
2	Yevgeny Novoselov	United Russia
3	Aleksey Voytov	United Russia
4	Dmitry Timofeyev	United Russia
5	Vladimir Ageyev	United Russia
6	Pavel Saydachakov	United Russia
7	Rashid Shamoyan	United Russia
8	Svetlana Galante	United Russia
9	Anar Atlukhanov	United Russia
10	Sergey Tyulkin	United Russia
11	Sergey Lozovsky	United Russia
12	Viktor Sirotin	United Russia
13	Andrey Kopylov	United Russia
14	Tatyana Romanova	United Russia

Party lists
Member	Party
Valery Ponomarev	United Russia
Sergey Merkulov	United Russia
Sergey Lebedev	United Russia
Yevgeny Mishchenko	United Russia
Anatoly Kirnosenko	United Russia
Aleksandr Burkhavetsky	United Russia
Dmitry Korostelev	United Russia
Gennady Razinov	United Russia
Mikhail Manannikov	United Russia
Valentin Pavlenko	United Russia
~~Roman Litvinov~~	Communist Party
Rais Gumerov	Communist Party
~~Leonid Slutsky~~	Liberal Democratic Party
Vladimir Smolin	Liberal Democratic Party
Darya Suchilina	New People
Aleksandra Novikova	A Just Russia

== See also ==
- 2026 Russian regional elections
