= Valery Ponomarev (politician) =

Russian politician (born 1959)

- Валерий Пономарёв
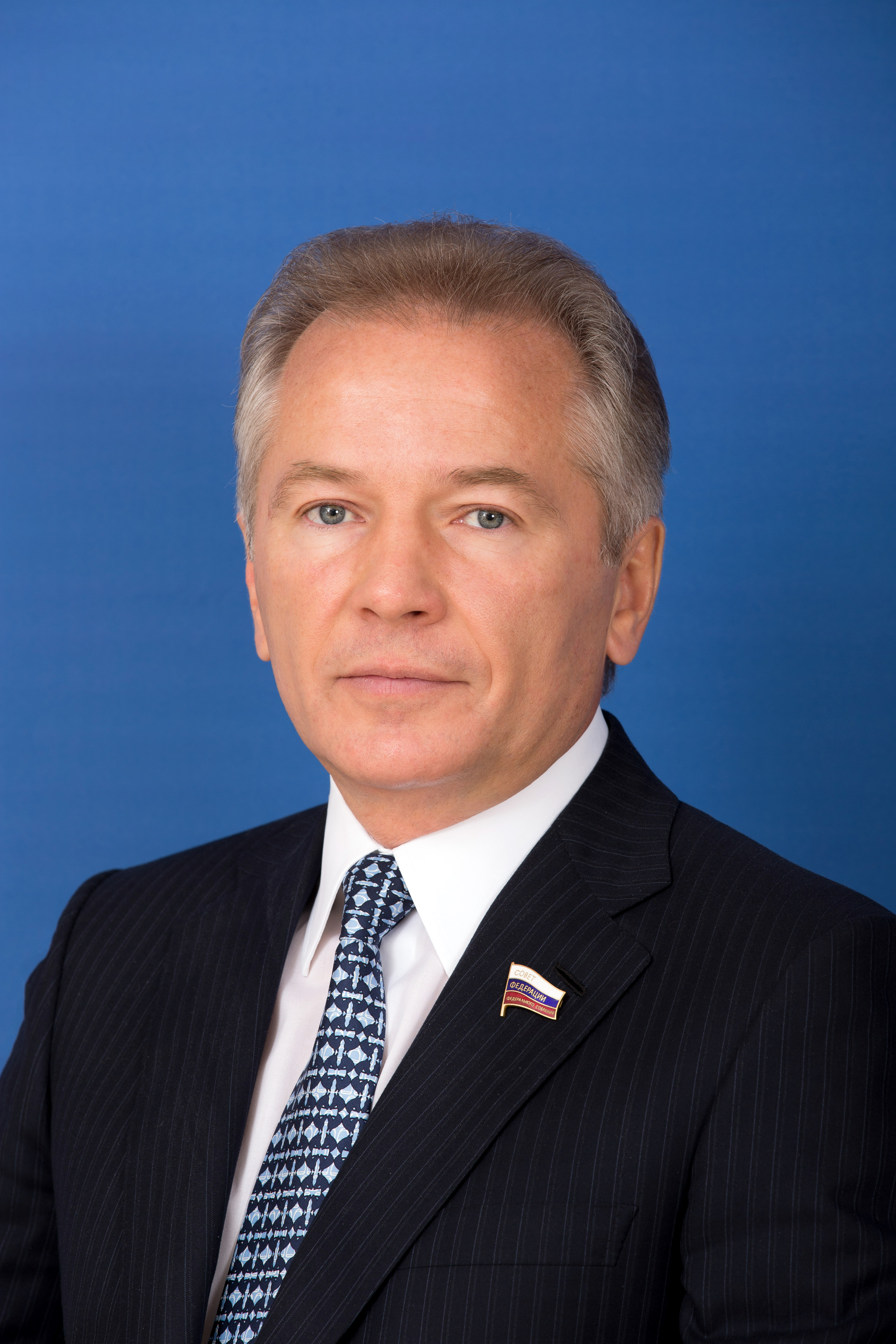

Senator from Kamchatka Krai
- Incumbent
- Assumed office 13 October 2021
- Preceded by: Boris Sorokin

Personal details
- Born: Valery Ponomarev; 17 August 1959 (age 67) Kurilsky District, Sakhalin Oblast, Russian Soviet Federative Socialist Republic, Soviet Union
- Party: United Russia
- Education: Siberian University of Consumer Cooperation

Valery Andreevich Ponomarev (Russian: Валерий Андреевич Пономарёв; born 17 August 1959) is a Russian politician serving as a senator from Kamchatka Krai since 13 October 2021.

== Biography ==
Valery Ponomarev was born on 17 August 1959 in Kurilsky District, Sakhalin Oblast. In 1983, he graduated from the Siberian University of Consumer Cooperation. In 1992, he received a degree from the All-Russian Academy of Foreign Trade. In 1983, he moved to Kamchatka to work in the Korfi fish cooperative. From 1984 to 1986, Ponomarev was the secretary of the Bystrinsky district committee of the Komsomol; then he also served as the head of the propaganda department of the Kamchatka regional committee of the Komsomol. From December 2007 to 2011, he was the deputy of the Legislative Assembly of Kamchatka Krai. On 19 December 2011, he became the senator in the Federation Council from the Legislative Assembly of Kamchatka Krai. In 2021, he was re-elected.

In his capacity as Chairman of the Russian-German Friendship Group of the Federation Council, he met regularly with German politicians, in particular with the German chairman of this group, Manuela Schwesig.

Ponomarev is one of the wealthiest senators. In 2013 and 2014, he took the 3rd and 2nd places in the ranking of the wealthiest members of the Federation Council.

Valery Ponomarev is under personal sanctions introduced by the European Union, the United Kingdom, the United States, Canada, Switzerland, Australia, Ukraine, New Zealand, for ratifying the decisions of the "Treaty of Friendship, Cooperation and Mutual Assistance between the Russian Federation and the Donetsk People's Republic and between the Russian Federation and the Luhansk People's Republic" and providing political and economic support for Russia's annexation of Ukrainian territories.
