= Viktor Orlov =

Russian politician (1940–2021)

- Виктор Орлов
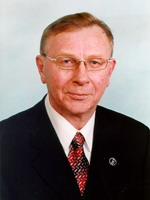
- Orlov in 2008

Russian Federation Senator from Kamchatka Krai
- In office 1 July 2007 – 10 January 2012
- Succeeded by: Boris Nevzorov

Minister of Natural Resources
- In office 6 October 1998 – 19 August 1999
- Preceded by: Viktor Nekrutenko
- Succeeded by: Boris Yatskevich

Minister of Natural Resources
- In office 22 August 1996 – 30 April 1998
- Preceded by: Viktor Danilov-Danilyan
- Succeeded by: Viktor Nekrutenko

Personal details
- Born: Viktor Petrovich Orlov; 22 March 1940 Chernogorsk, Khakas Autonomous Oblast, Krasnoyarsk Krai, Russian SFSR, Soviet Union
- Died: 23 August 2021 (aged 81) Russia

Viktor Petrovich Orlov (Russian: Виктор Петрович Орлов; 22 March 1940 – 23 August 2021), was a Russian politician, geologist, and mining engineer. He served as the Minister of Natural Resources from 1996 to 1998, and again from 1998 to 1999.

He also served as a representative in the Federation Council from the administration of Kamchatka Krai.

== Biography ==
Viktor Orlov was born on 22 March 1940 to a working-class family in the Ninth Village of Chernogorsk.

After leaving school, he worked in the mine administration 14/15. He served on the island of Sakhalin, starting as corporal and ending as newspaper correspondent. After demobilization, he was the released secretary of mine No. 9 in Chernogorsk.

In 1968 he graduated from the Kuibyshev Tomsk State University, majoring in geology. He had great indicators were during training and at Komsomol work. He was elected first deputy secretary, and later secretary of the local university cell of the Komsomol. As a graduate, Orlov's thesis work received a silver medal from Exhibition of Achievements of National Economy. He worked in geological expeditions in Iran.

From 1968 to 1969, he was a geologist of the West Siberian geological expedition.

From 1969 to 1975, he was a geologist, then promoted to chief geologist, and was the head of the Sheregeshevskaya exploration party.

From 1978 to 1979, he was a chief geologist of the search and survey team of the Shalynskaya expedition of the West Siberian Geological Administration.

From 1979 to 1981, he was a senior geologist, and the deputy head of the geological department of the industrial geological association "Tsentrgeologiya".

From 1981 to 1984, he was the Deputy Head of the Geological Department of the Ministry of Geology of the RSFSR.

From 1984 to 1986, he studied at the full-time department of the Academy of National Economy under the Council of Ministers of the USSR. After completing his studies, he received the specialty "Economics and Management of the National Economy" and a diploma with honors. He was a candidate of Geological and Mineralogical Sciences, and a doctor of Economic Sciences. He was the corresponding member of the Russian Academy of Natural Sciences.

From 1986 to 1990, he was the General Director of the industrial geological association "Tsentrgeologiya".

From August 1990 to November 1990, he was the Deputy Minister of Geology of the USSR.

From 1990 to 1991, he was the First Deputy Chairman of the RSFSR State Committee for Geology and the Use of Fuel, Energy and Mineral Resources.

In 1991, he was the professor at Moscow Geological Prospecting University, and an honorary doctor and member of the Academic Council of Tomsk State University.

From 1992 to 1993, he was the Chairman of the Committee on Geology and Subsoil Use under the Government of Russia.

From 1993 to 1996, he was the Chairman of the Committee on Geology and Subsoil Use.

On 22 August 1996, Orlov became Minister of Natural Resources until 30 April 1998.

In 1998, he had been President of the Russian Geological Society.

On 6 October 1998, he became minister again and held the same position until 19 August 1999.

On 24 January 2001, Orlov became the representative in the Federation Council from the executive authority of the Koryak Autonomous Okrug. As the Koryak Autonomous Okrug merged into Kamchatka Krai, in 2007, he became the a representative since 1 July 2007. of the Kamchatka Territory on executive authority. He was the First Deputy Chairman of the Federation Council Committee on Natural Resources and Environmental Protection, as well as a member of the Federation Council Commission on Natural Monopolies.

Between 2004 and 2012, he was the Chairman of the Federation Council Committee on Natural Resources and Environmental Protection, and was a member of the boards of the Ministry of Natural Resources and Ecology and the Federal Agency for Subsoil Use.

Vitkor Petrovich Orlov died on 23 August 2021.

== Family ==
He was married, and had three daughters.
