= Vladimir Biryukov (politician) =

Russian politician and businessman (1933–2021)

- Владимир Бирюков
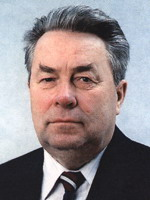
- Official portrait, 2008

1st Governor of Kamchatka Oblast
- In office 16 November 1991 – 28 December 2000
- Succeeded by: Mikhail Mashkovtsev

Personal details
- Born: 19 October 1933 Astrakhan, Russian SFSR, Soviet Union
- Died: 6 January 2021 (aged 87) Russia
- Party: Our Home - Russia

Vladimir Afanasyevich Biryukov (Russian: Владимир Афанасьевич Бирюков; 19 October 1933 – 6 January 2021) was a Russian politician and businessman who was the 1st Governor (Head) of Kamchatka Oblast. He was also the chairman of the Board of Directors of OJSC Kamchatgazprom.

== Biography ==
Vladimir Biryukov was born on 19 October 1933 in Astrakhan to the family of workers.

=== Education and work ===
He graduated from the faculty of industrial fishing of the Astrakhan Technical Institute of the Fishing Industry and Economy with a degree in mechanical engineering in 1956. He worked at the enterprises of the fishing industry in Kamchatka, was the general director of PA Kamchatrybprom.

=== Political activity ===
He was a deputy of the Kamchatka Regional Council of People's Deputies Between 1970 and 1982 and again in 1990.

From 1977 to 1979, he was the second secretary of the Kamchatka regional committee of the CPSU. From 1979 to 1980, he was the Chairman of the Kamchatka Regional Executive Committee.

From 1980 to 1987, from chief specialist of the Kamchatka branch of Giprorybprom.

In 1980, he was accused of postscripting while he was the general director of the Kamchatka fishing industry. At the request of the prosecutor's office, he was relieved of his post and expelled from the CPSU. In 1987, the case was closed, and he was then reinstated to the Communist Party of the Soviet Union.

From 1980 to 1981, he was a deputy of the Supreme Soviet of the RSFSR.

From 1987 to 1989, he was Deputy Chairman of the agro-industrial complex of the Kamchatka region. From 1989 to 1990, he became the General Director of PA Kamchatpischeprom. In 1990, he was the Chairman of the Kamchatka Regional Executive Committee.

On 16 November 1991, Biryukov became first governor (head) of Kamchatka Oblast. In December 1996, he was elected governor of Kamchatka Oblast. He was a member of the Federation Council, was a member of the Committee on Budget, Tax Policy, Financial, Currency and Customs Regulation, Banking.

In October 1998, Biryukov refused to accept the Order of Honor from Boris Yeltsin, stating that such an assessment of his merits was "untimely". However, in December 2000, he accepted this order from Vladimir Putin.

In October 2000, Biryukov announced his refusal to participate in the next gubernatorial elections scheduled for December. Mikhail Mashkovtsev was eventually elected as the new governor.

He died on 6 January 2021.

== Family ==
He was married and had a daughter and a son.
