= Valeriy Raenko =

Russian politician (1955–2021)

Chairman of the Legislative Assembly of Kamchatka Krai
- In office 19 December 2011 – 5 May 2021

Personal details
- Born: 15 September 1955 Krasnosulinsky District, Russian SFSR, Soviet Union
- Died: 5 May 2021 (aged 65)
- Party: United Russia

Valeriy Fyodorovich Raenko (Russian: Валерий Фёдорович Раенко; 15 September 1955 – 5 May 2021) was a Russian politician. A member of the United Russia party, he served as Chairman of the Legislative Assembly of Kamchatka Krai from 2011 to 2021.

== Biography ==
Raenko was born on a farm in the Krasnosulinsky District of the Russian SFSR. He graduated from the Rostov State Medical University with a degree in epidemiology. In 2007, he completed his studies at the Far Eastern Institute of Management. He worked as a physician from 1984 to 1997 in Karaginsky and Milkovsky. From 1997 to 2007, he served as Deputy Chairman of the Kamchatka Krai Department of Health.

In 2007, Raenko was elected to the Legislative Assembly of Kamchatka Krai. On 19 December 2011, he became chairman. He was re-elected in 2016. Simultaneously, he was Secretary of the United Russia party in Kamchatka Krai.

Valeriy Raenko died on 5 May 2021, at the age of 65 following a long illness.

== Distinctions ==
- Medal of the Order "For Merit to the Fatherland" Second Class (2015)
- Order of Honour (2021)
