= Aleksey Kuzmitsky =

Russian politician (born 1967)

- Алексей Кузьмицкий
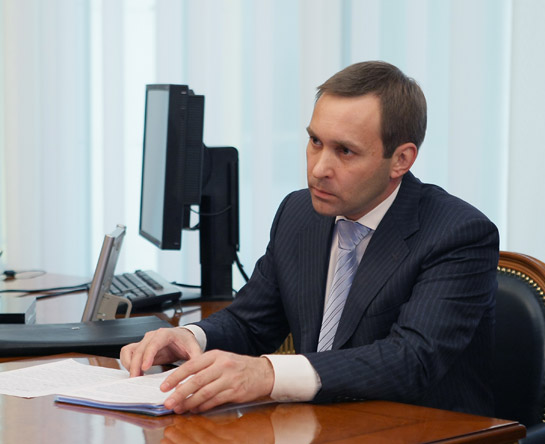
- Kuzmitsky in 2009

Deputy Plenipotentiary Representative in the Volga Federal District
- Incumbent
- Assumed office January 2019

Auditor of the Accounts Chamber of Russia
- In office 23 March 2011 – 20 September 2013
- Preceded by: Viktor Kosourov
- Succeeded by: Andrey Perchyan

1st Governor of Kamchatka Krai
- In office 2 July 2007 – 25 February 2011
- Succeeded by: Vladimir Ilyukhin

Personal details
- Born: Aleksey Alekseyevich Kuzmitsky; 5 August 1967 (age 59) Belovo, Kemerovo Oblast, RSFSR, Soviet Union

Aleksey Alekseyevich Kuzmitsky (Russian: Алексей Алексеевич Кузьмицкий; born on 5 August 1967) is a Russian politician who had served as the first governor of Kamchatka Krai from 2007 to 2011.

== Biography ==
Aleksey Kuzmitsky was born in Belovo, Kemerovo Oblast on 5 August 1967.

He graduated in 1992 from the Saint Petersburg Electrotechnical Institute.

In 1999, he graduated in absentia from the Saint Petersburg State Engineering and Economic Academy with a degree in Finance and Credit.

Until 2001, he worked in Pskov as an engineer, in various management positions at enterprises in the city.

Between 2002 and 2004, he worked as the head of departments at the Federal State Unitary Enterprise "Natsrybresurs" in Moscow, and the North-Western Interregional Public Organization "Federation of Cosmonautics of Russia" in Saint Petersburg, and then at the Union "Regional Rescue Service" as an Advisor to the General Director of OJSC "Russian Institute radio navigation and time” in Saint Petersburg.

In 2003, he studied at the North-Western Academy of Public Administration, and in 2005, he received additional higher education with a degree in State and Municipal Administration.

From 2005 to 2007, Kuzmitsky held the position of the Deputy Governor of the Kamchatka Oblast, as he headed the Department for Local Self-Government of the apparatus.

After the departure of Mikhail Mashkovtsev from the post of governor, Kuzmitsky was appointed on 23 May 2007 as the acting Governor of the Kamchatka Oblast. After the approval of his candidacy by the Council of People's Deputies of the Kamchatka Oblast and the Koryak Autonomous Okrug Duma, Kuzmitsky became the governor of the new subject of Kamchatka Krai, formed on 1 July 2007. In December 2007, Kuzmitsky was elected to the State Duma of the 5th convocation from United Russia, but refused the mandate in favor of Irina Yarovaya, who originally did not enter the Duma.

Between December 2007 to 2011, he was a member of the State Council of Russia.

From 27 May to 1 December 2008, he was a member of the Presidium of the State Council of Russia.

On 25 February 2011, Russian President Dmitry Medvedev dismissed Kuzmitsky with the wording "of his own free will.".

On 23 March 2011, Kuzmisky was appointed to the position of auditor of the Accounts Chamber by the decision of the State Duma on the proposal of the President of Russia. He held this position until 20 September 2013.

From 2014 to 2019, he was Advisor to the CEO of Rostec Corporation.

Since January 2019, Kuzmitsky has been the Deputy Plenipotentiary Representative in the Volga Federal District.
