= Governor of Kamchatka Krai =

Highest-ranking official in Kamchatka Krai, Russia

- Coat of arms of Kamchatka Krai

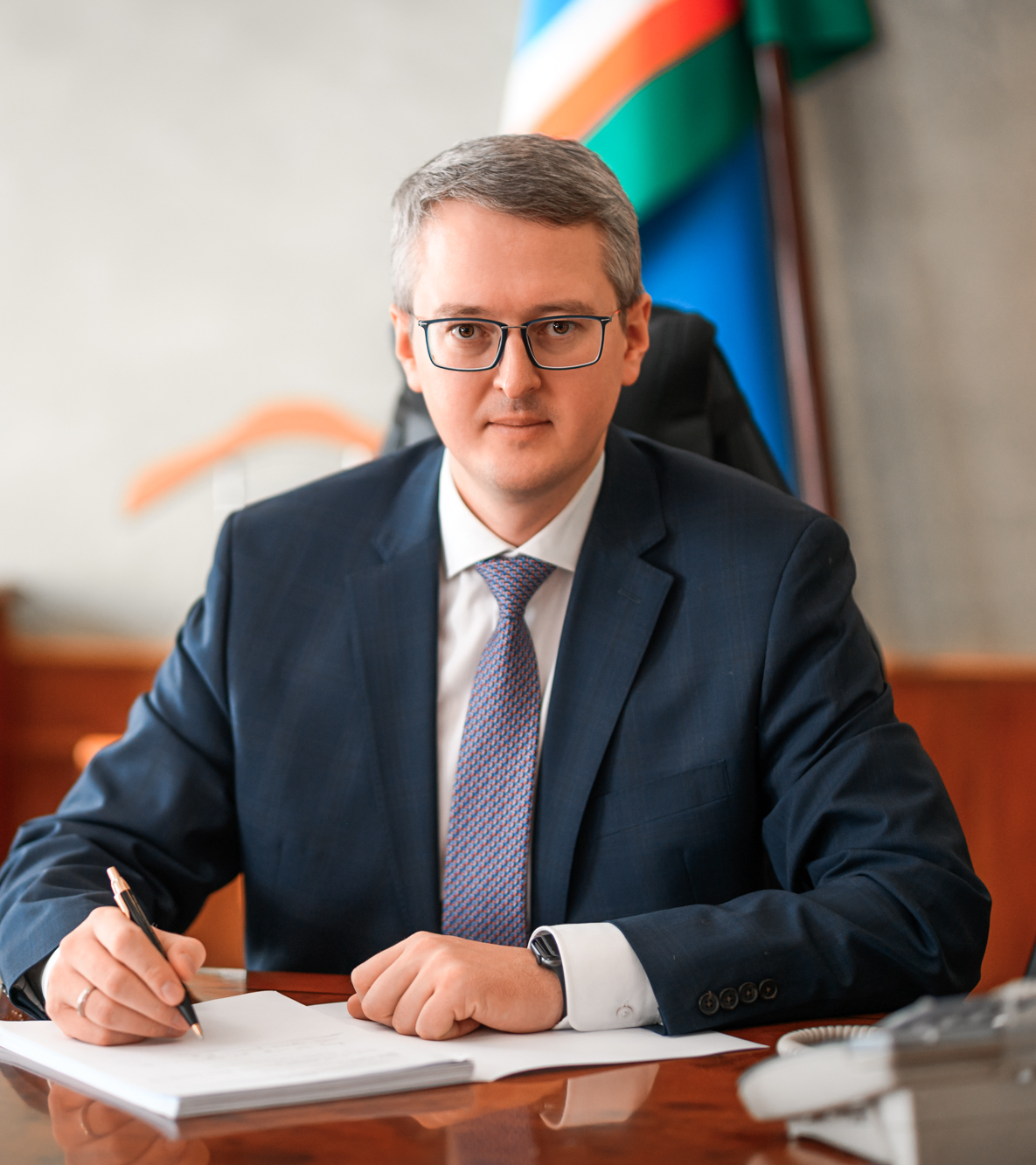
- Incumbent; Vladimir Solodov since 3 April 2020
- Seat: Petropavlovsk-Kamchatsky
- Appointer: Popular vote
- Term length: 5 years, renewable
- Constituting instrument: Charter of Kamchatka Krai, Section 5
- Inaugural holder: Aleksey Kuzmitsky
- Formation: 2 July 2007 (current form)
- Website: governor.kamgov.ru

The Governor of Kamchatka Krai (Russian: Губернатор Камчатского края) is the governor of Kamchatka Krai, a federal subject of Russia.

The governor is the highest-ranking official and head of administration of the government of Kamchatka Krai, and is elected for a five-year term that is renewable once consecutively. The office of Governor of Kamchatka Krai was established when Kamchatka Krai was formed on 1 July 2007 as a result of the unification of Kamchatka Oblast and Koryak Autonomous Okrug.

The current governor is Vladimir Solodov of United Russia who took office on 3 April 2020.

== List of officeholders ==
| No. | Portrait | Governor | Tenure | Time in office | Party | Election |
|---|---|---|---|---|---|---|
| 1 | | Vladimir Biryukov (1933–2021) | 16 November 1991 – 28 December 2000 (retired) | 9 years, 42 days | Independent | Appointed 1996 |
| 2 | | Mikhail Mashkovtsev (1947–2022) | 28 December 2000 – 23 May 2007 (resigned) | 6 years, 146 days | Communist | 2000; 2004 |
| – | | Aleksey Kuzmitsky (born 1967) | 23 May 2007 – 1 July 2007 | 39 days | United Russia | Acting |
On 1 July 2007, Kamchatka Oblast and Koryak Autonomous Okrug were merged into Kamchatka Krai.
| 3 | | Aleksey Kuzmitsky (born 1967) | 2 July 2007 – 25 February 2011 (resigned) | 3 years, 238 days | United Russia | 2007 (Note: Appointed by the president of Russia with the consent of the Kamchatka Oblast Council of People's Deputies and Koryak Duma.) |
| – | | Vladimir Ilyukhin (born 1961) | 25 February 2011 – 3 March 2011 | 9 years, 38 days | United Russia | Acting |
| 4 | | Vladimir Ilyukhin (born 1961) | 3 March 2011 – 13 May 2015 (resigned) | 9 years, 38 days | United Russia | 2011 (Note: Appointed by the president of Russia with the consent of the Legislative Assembly of Kamchatka Krai.) |
| – | | Vladimir Ilyukhin (born 1961) | 13 May 2015 – 22 September 2015 | 9 years, 38 days | United Russia | Acting |
| (4) | | Vladimir Ilyukhin (born 1961) | 22 September 2015 – 3 April 2020 (resigned) | 9 years, 38 days | United Russia | 2015 |
| – | | Vladimir Solodov (born 1982) | 3 April 2020 – 21 September 2020 | 6 years, 163 days | United Russia | Acting |
| 5 | | Vladimir Solodov (born 1982) | 21 September 2020 – present | 6 years, 163 days | United Russia | 2020; 2025 |

== Sources ==
- World Statesmen.org
