= Rovny Island =

Rovnyy Ровный
- Island
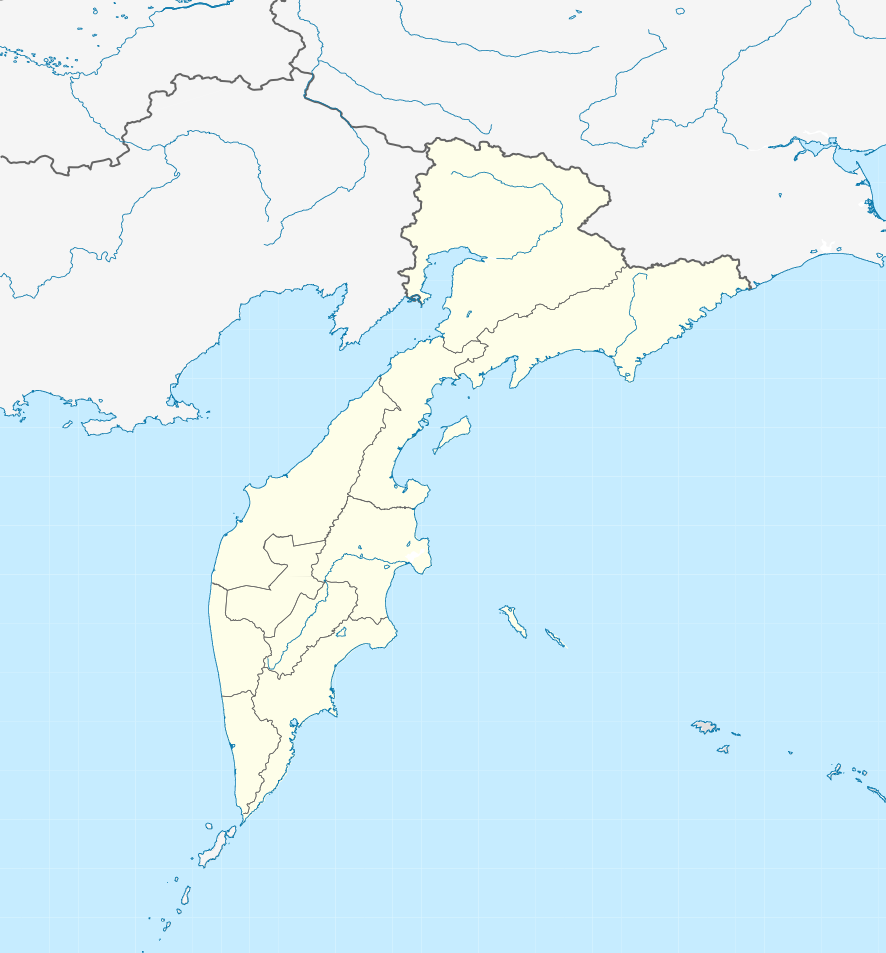
- Location within Kamchatka Krai
- Coordinates: 60°51′30″N 163°17′20″E
- Country: Russian Federation
- Federal subject: Far Eastern Federal District
- Krai: Kamchatka Krai
- Elevation: 208 m (682 ft)

Rovnyy Island or Arka Island is an island in Shelikhov Bay, Sea of Okhotsk.

== Geography ==
Rovnyy Island is 2.2 km long and 1.4 km wide. It is located off the eastern coast of Penzhina Bay, separated from the continental shore by a 6.8 km wide sound. Administratively it belongs to the Kamchatka Krai.

== History ==
American whaleships cruised for bowhead whales off the island from 1860 to 1889. They called it Umbrella Island.
