= Zubchaty Island =

Zubchaty Island Зубчатый
- Island
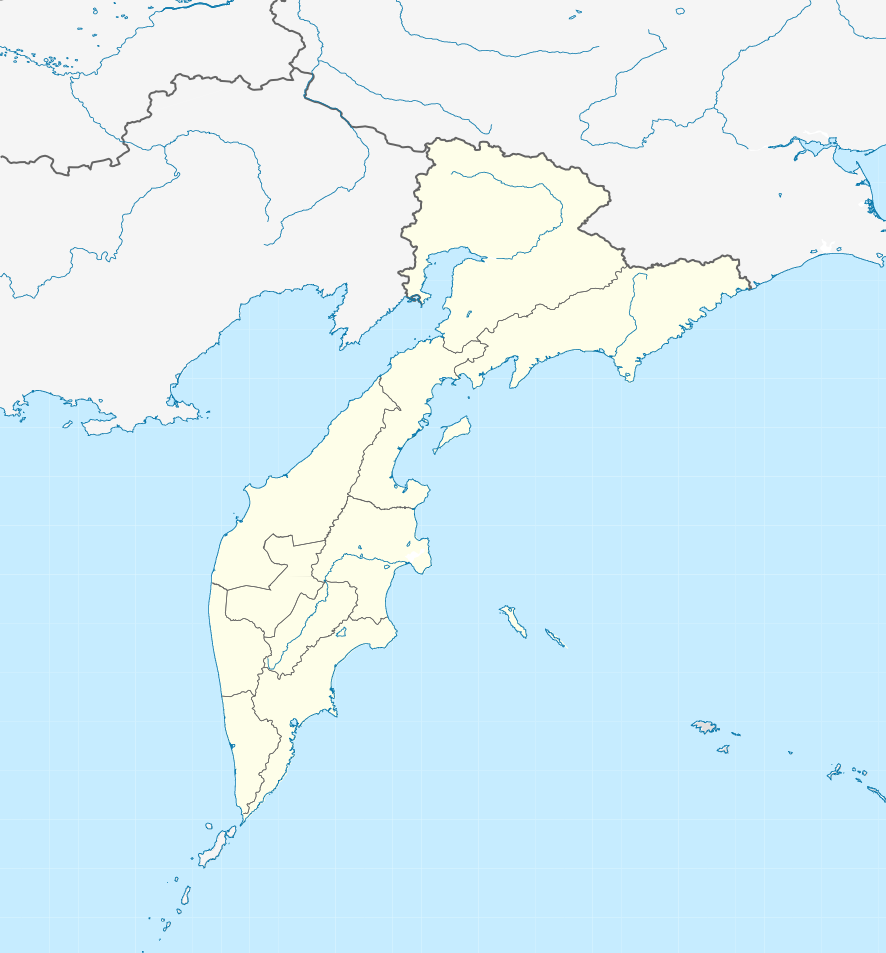
- Location within Kamchatka Krai
- Coordinates: 60°48′N 162°45′E
- Country: Russian Federation
- Federal subject: Kamchatka Krai
- District: Tigilsky District

Zubchaty (Russian: Зубчатый) is an uninhabited island in Shelikhov Gulf of the northeastern Sea of Okhotsk. It lies on the eastern side of Penzhina Bay. It has a serrated summit.

It is within the Tigilsky District of Kamchatka Krai, in the Russian Far East.

== History ==
American whaleships cruised for bowhead whales off the island from 1863 to 1889. They called it Crag Island.

== See also ==
- Islands of the Sea of Okhotsk
- Islands of the Russian Far East
