= Khalaktyrskoye Lake =

- Location within Russia
- Location: Petropavlovsk-Kamchatsky, Kamchatka Krai, Russia
- Coordinates: 53°01′29″N 158°44′45″E
- Type: lake
- Primary outflows: River Halaktyrka
- Surface area: 22 square kilometers (8.5 sq mi)
- Max. depth: 121 metres (397 ft)

Khalaktyrskoye (Russian: Халактырское озеро) is a lake on the eastern outskirts of the city Petropavlovsk-Kamchatsky in Kamchatka Krai, Russia. It occupies an area of 22 square kilometers (8.5 sq mi), maximum depth is 121 metres (397 ft). Its main outflow is River Halaktyrka.
