= Boris Nevzorov (politician) =

Russian politician

- Борис Невзоров
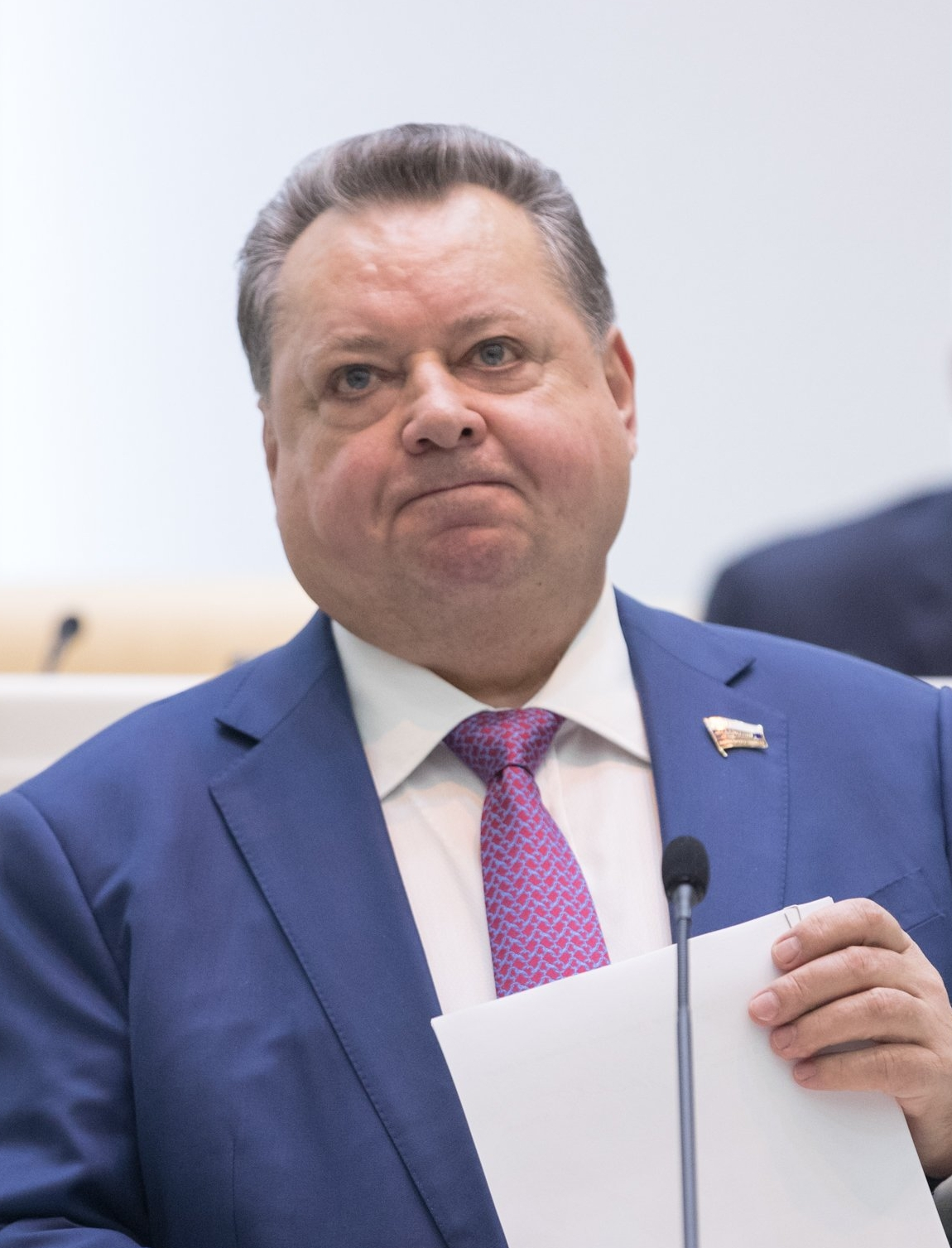

Senator from Kamchatka Krai
- Incumbent
- Assumed office 10 January 2012
- Preceded by: Viktor Orlov

Personal details
- Born: Boris Nevzorov; 21 September 1955 (age 71) Michurinsk, Tambov Oblast, Soviet Union
- Party: United Russia
- Education: Kutafin Moscow State Law University

Boris Aleksandrovich Nevzorov (Russian: Борис Александрович Невзоров; born 21 September 1955) is a Russian politician serving as a senator from Kamchatka Krai since 10 January 2012.

== Career ==
Boris Nevzorov was born on 21 September 1955 in Michurinsk, Tambov Oblast. In 1984, he graduated from the Kutafin Moscow State Law University. After graduation, he worked as electric lineman of high-voltage lines in Tambov Oblast. Later, he served in the Soviet Airborne Forces. In 1977, Nevzorov moved to Kamchatka Krai where he started working as a loader in the local factories. A year later, he started his career in the police. In 1991, he became the head of the trading company "Priboy-Samsung"; and also became a co-founder of multiple fishing and fish processing companies in Kamchatka. From 2012 to 2012, Nevzorov served as the Secretary of the Kamchatka regional branch of the United Russia party. In 2000, he was also appointed the head of the Ust-Kamchatsk municipal district. In 2003, he was elected to the Council of People's Deputies of the Kamchatka Region of the 3rd convocation. On 2 December 2007, Nevzorov was elected deputy of the Legislative Assembly of Kamchatka Krai of the 1st convocation. From 2007 to 2011, he also served as the head of the Legislative Assembly. On 10 January 2012 he was appointed a senator from Kamchatka Krai.

== Sanctions ==
Boris Nevzorov is under personal sanctions introduced by the European Union, the United Kingdom, the USA, Canada, Switzerland, Australia, Ukraine, New Zealand, for ratifying the decisions of the "Treaty of Friendship, Cooperation and Mutual Assistance between the Russian Federation and the Donetsk People's Republic and between the Russian Federation and the Luhansk People's Republic" and providing political and economic support for Russia's annexation of Ukrainian territories.
