= List of environmental ministers of Russia =

This is a list of ministers of environment of Russia.

== Russian SFSR ==
=== Chairman of the State Committee for Nature Protection ===
Minister	Political party	Term of office	
Alexey Kovalchuk	Communist Party	11 May 1988	15 May 1990

=== Chairman of the State Committee for Ecology and Nature Management ===
Minister	Political party	Term of office	
Igor Gavrilov	Communist Party	14 July 1990	30 July 1991

=== Minister of Ecology and Nature Management ===
Minister	Political party	Term of office		Cabinet
Igor Gavrilov	Communist Party	30 July 1991	5 December 1991	Silayev II
Igor Gavrilov	Communist Party	30 July 1991	5 December 1991	Yeltsin & Gaidar

=== Minister of Ecology and Natural Resources ===
Minister	Political party	Term of office		Cabinet
Viktor Danilov-Danilyan	Independent	3 December 1991	25 December 1991	Yeltsin & Gaidar

== Russian Federation ==
=== Minister of Ecology and Natural Resources ===
Minister	Political party	Term of office		Cabinet
Viktor Danilov-Danilyan	Independent	25 December 1991	30 September 1992	Yeltsin & Gaidar

=== Minister of Environmental Protection and Natural Resources ===
Minister	Political party	Term of office		Cabinet
Viktor Danilov-Danilyan	Independent → Constructive Ecological Party "KEDR"	30 September 1992	14 August 1996	Yeltsin & Gaidar
Viktor Danilov-Danilyan	Independent → Constructive Ecological Party "KEDR"	30 September 1992	14 August 1996	Chernomyrdin I

=== Chairman of the State Committee for Environmental Protection ===
Minister	Political party	Term of office	
Viktor Danilov-Danilyan	Constructive Ecological Party "KEDR"	22 August 1996	2 June 2000

=== Ministers of Natural Resources ===
Minister	Political party	Term of office		Cabinet
Viktor Orlov	Independent	22 August 1996	30 April 1998	Chernomyrdin II
Viktor Nekrutenko	Independent	30 April 1998	6 October 1998	Kiriyenko
Viktor Nekrutenko	Independent	30 April 1998	6 October 1998	Primakov
Viktor Orlov	Independent	6 October 1998	19 August 1999	Primakov
Viktor Orlov	Independent	6 October 1998	19 August 1999	Stepashin
Boris Yatskevich	Independent	19 August 1999	16 June 2001	Putin I
Boris Yatskevich	Independent	19 August 1999	16 June 2001	Kasyanov
Vitaly Artyukhov	United Russia	16 June 2001	9 March 2004	Kasyanov
Yury Trutnev	United Russia	9 March 2004	12 May 2008	Fradkov I
Yury Trutnev	United Russia	9 March 2004	12 May 2008	Fradkov II
Yury Trutnev	United Russia	9 March 2004	12 May 2008	Zubkov

=== Ministers of Natural Resources and Ecology ===
Minister	Political party	Term of office		Cabinet
Yury Trutnev	United Russia	12 May 2008	21 May 2012	Putin II
Sergey Donskoy	Independent	21 May 2012	18 May 2018	Medvedev I
Dmitry Kobylkin	United Russia	18 May 2018	9 November 2020	Medvedev II
Dmitry Kobylkin	United Russia	18 May 2018	9 November 2020	Mishustin
Svetlana Radchenko as Acting Minister from 9 to 10 November 2020				Mishustin
Alexander Kozlov	United Russia	10 November 2020	Incumbent	Mishustin
