= Siberian University of Consumer Cooperation =

University in Leninsky District, Novosibirsk

- Сибирский университет потребительской кооперации
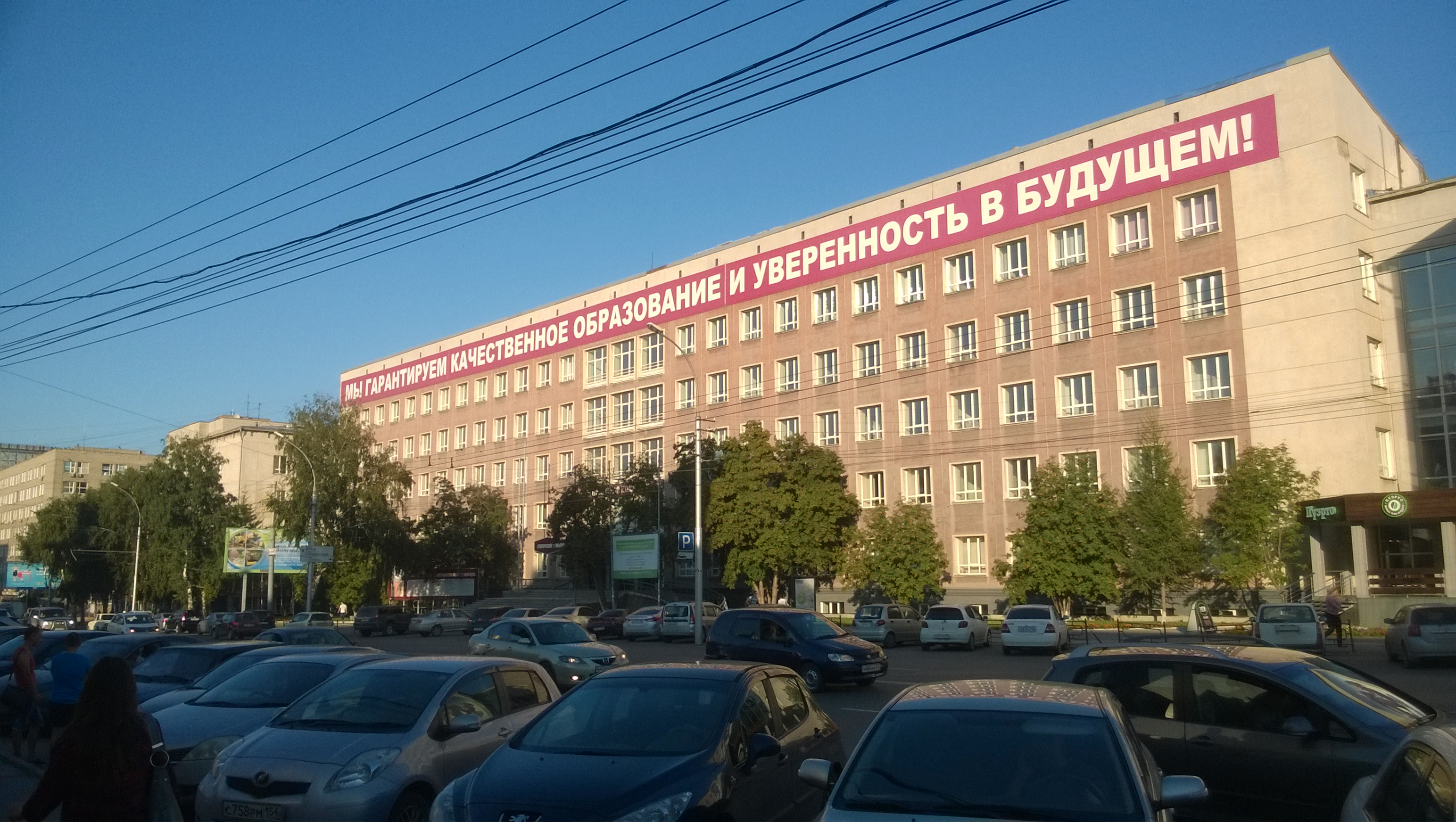
- Former names: Novosibirsk Institute of Soviet Cooperative Trade
- Established: 1956
- Location: Novosibirsk, Russia; 54.9906°N 82.9098°E
- Website: www.sibupk.su

Siberian University of Consumer Cooperation (Russian: Сибирский университет потребительской кооперации) is a university in Leninsky District of Novosibirsk, Russia. It was founded in 1956.

== History ==
In 1956, the Novosibirsk Institute of Soviet Cooperative Trade was established. In the early 1970s, the campus of the institute was practically formed.

== Faculties ==
- Faculty of Economics and Management
- Faculty of Commerce and Technology
- Faculty of Law

== Branches ==
The university has branches in Tyumen, Kyzyl, Ulan-Ude, Chita and Yakutsk.

== Bibliography ==
- Ламин В. А. (2003). Энциклопедия. Новосибирск. Новосибирск: Новосибирское книжное издательство. pp. 784–785. ISBN 5-7620-0968-8.
