= 2020 Russian regional elections =

← 2019	13 September 2020	2021 →
- Map showing location of Russian regional elections in 2020 Governor Governor and regional parliament Regional parliament

The 2020 Russian regional elections took place across three days from 11 to 13 September 2020 in 28 out of the 85 federal subjects of Russia. Voters elected 18 directly-elected governors, 2 indirectly-elected governors and 11 regional parliaments. The elections also coincided with local elections in many cities. A total of 156,000 candidates stood for 78,000 positions at regional, local and municipal levels. The vote was extended over three days in a move the government said was to avoid over-crowding and to reduce the risk from COVID-19.

Candidates for the ruling United Russia party or their allies won all 20 governorships with more than 50% of the vote, meaning they would not need to hold a second round run-off. However, the party lost their majority in city assemblies in Tomsk, Novosibirsk and Tambov.

Ben Noble characterised the elections as the Kremlin's dress rehearsal for the 2021 State Duma elections.

== Campaign ==
The election was led by incumbent candidates from the governing United Russia party competing against parties Liberal Democratic Party, A Just Russia and the Communist Party and independents. Opposition leader Alexei Navalny called on opposition voters to use "Smart Voting" by voting for candidates most likely to win against United Russia.

The campaign in Archangelsk Oblast came after the governor had proposed fully integrating the Nenets Autonomous Okrug into the Oblast. This had provoked demonstrations until the proposals were withdrawn.

== Results ==
=== Gubernatorial elections ===
All incumbent governors were re-elected.

Governors
Federal subject	Position	Previous Governor	Party	Elected Governor	Party	Votes Received
Sevastopol	Governor	Mikhail Razvozhaev	United Russia	Mikhail Razvozhaev	United Russia	85.7%
Tatarstan	President	Rustam Minnikhanov	United Russia	Rustam Minnikhanov	United Russia	85.4%
Chuvashia	Head	Oleg Nikolaev	A Just Russia	Oleg Nikolaev	A Just Russia	75.6%
Komi Republic	Head	Vladimir Uyba	Independent	Vladimir Uyba	Independent	73.2%
Kamchatka	Governor	Vladimir Solodov	United Russia	Vladimir Solodov	United Russia	80.5%
Krasnodar	Governor	Veniamin Kondratyev	United Russia	Veniamin Kondratyev	United Russia	85%
Perm	Governor	Dimitri Makhonin	Independent	Dmitry Makhonin	Independent	75.7%
Jewish Autonomous Oblast	Governor	Rostislav Goldstein	United Russia	Rostislav Goldstein	United Russia	82.5%
Arkhangelsk	Governor	Alexander Tsybulsky	United Russia	Alexander Tsybulsky	United Russia	69.6%
Bryansk	Governor	Alexander Bogomaz	United Russia	Alexander Bogomaz	United Russia	71.7%
Kaluga	Governor	Vladislav Shapsha	United Russia	Vladislav Shapsha	United Russia	
Kostroma	Governor	Sergei Sitnikov	United Russia	Sergei Sitnikov	United Russia	65.1%
Irkutsk	Governor	Igor Kobzev	Independent	Igor Kobzev	Independent	60.7%
Leningrad	Governor	Aleksandr Drozdenko	United Russia	Aleksandr Drozdenko	United Russia	83.6%
Penza	Governor	Ivan Belozertsev	United Russia	Ivan Belozertsev	United Russia	78.7%
Rostov	Governor	Vasily Golubev	United Russia	Vasily Golubev	United Russia	65.6%
Smolensk	Governor	Alexey Ostrovsky	Liberal Democratic Party	Alexey Ostrovsky	Liberal Democratic Party	58%
Tambov	Head	Alexander Nikitin	United Russia	Alexander Nikitin	United Russia	86.5%
Nenets	Governor	Yuri Bezdudny	United Russia	Yuri Bezdudny	United Russia	87.5%
Khanty-Mansi	Governor	Natalya Komarova	United Russia	Natalya Komarova	United Russia	76.3%
