= Vladimir Ilyukhin =

Russian politician (born 1961)

- Владимир Илюхин
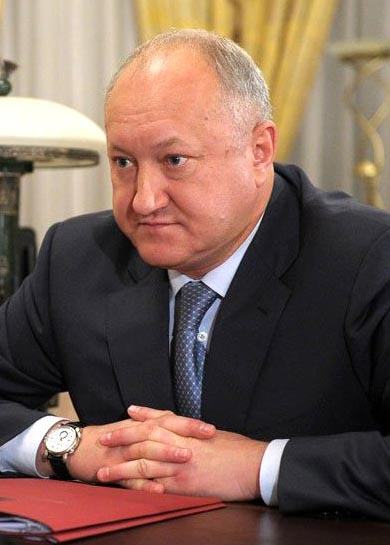
- Ilyukhin in 2012

2nd Governor of Kamchatka Krai
- In office 3 March 2011 – 3 April 2020
- Preceded by: Aleksey Kuzmitsky
- Succeeded by: Vladimir Solodov

Governor of Kamchatka Krai (acting)
- In office 25 February 2011 – 3 March 2011

Personal details
- Born: Vladimir Ivanovich Ilyukhin; 25 July 1961 (age 64) Novonikolayevka, Russian SFSR, Soviet Union
- Party: United Russia

Vladimir Ivanovich Ilyukhin (Russian: Владимир Иванович Илюхин; born on 25 July 1961), is a Russian politician who was the Governor of Kamchatka Krai from 3 March 2011 to 3 April 2020.

== Biography ==
Ilyukhin was born on 25 July 1961. He graduated from the Khabarovsk Institute of National Economy and the Far Eastern Academy of Public Service.

Since 1983, he worked as an instructor of the department, and the chief of staff of the Komsomol building of the Petropavlovsk city committee of the Komsomol of the Kamchatka Krai. Several years later, he was the head of the department of the regional committee of the Komsomol of the Kamchatka Krai. From 1988 to 1991 he worked as the head of the department, deputy director of the Regional Center of NTTM in the Kamchatka Krai.

In the early 1990s he started commercial activities. In 1991-1994 he headed the JSC "Dream" in Petropavlovsk-Kamchatsky. From 1994-99 he was the executive director of the Kamchatka Union of Entrepreneurs. Since 1999, he held the post of director of the state unitary enterprise "Kamchatka Exhibition Center".

In 2000–02, he headed the administration of industry, business, energy and mineral resources of the administration of the Kamchatka region. From 2002-07, he held the post of chief federal inspector for the Koryak Autonomous District of the Office of the Plenipotentiary of the President of the Russian Federation in the Far Eastern Federal District.

In January 2008, he was appointed Chief Federal Inspector in the Republic of Sakha as an authorized representative of the President of the Russian Federation in the Far Eastern Federal District. In July 2009, he was appointed Chief Federal Inspector for Kamchatka Krai.

On 25 February 2011, he was appointed acting governor of the Kamchatka Krai, replacing Aleksey Kuzmitsky, who was dismissed. On 3 March, he was vested with the powers of the governor and was sworn in.

In December 2011, Illyukhin received the mandate of a deputy of the State Duma of the Sixth convocation from President Dmitry Medvedev. He refused the mandate in favor of Irina Yarovaya, who did not go to the Duma.

On 13 May 2015, Ilyukhin filed a petition for resignation from the post of governor of the Kamchatka Krai. He was instead appointed temporarily acting governor before the new elections. He was reelected on 13 September.

On 3 April 2020, he filed again a petition for resignation from the post of governor of the Kamchatka Krai. Vladimir Solodov was appointed temporarily acting governor.

== Personal life ==
With personal income for 2011 in the amount of 49.5 million rubles, Vladimir Ilyukhin ranks fourth in the ranking of incomes of heads of federal subjects of Russia.
