= Mikhail Mashkovtsev =

Russian politician (1947–2022)

- Михаил Машковцев
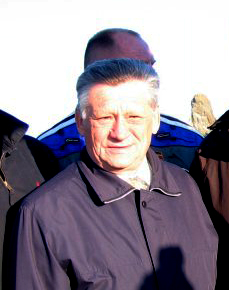
- Mashkovtsev in 2017

2nd Governor of Kamchatka Oblast
- In office 28 December 2000 – 23 May 2007
- Preceded by: Vladimir Biryukov
- Succeeded by: Aleksey Kuzmitsky

Personal details
- Born: 1 January 1947 Minsk, Byelorussian SSR, Soviet Union
- Died: 29 October 2022 (aged 75)
- Party: CPSU → CPRF → Communists of Russia

Mikhail Borisovich Mashkovtsev (Russian: Михаил Борисович Машковцев; 1 January 1947 – 29 October 2022) was a Russian politician who was the Governor of Kamchatka Oblast from 2000 to 2007.

== Early life ==
Mikhail Mashkovtsev was born on 1 January 1947 in Minsk, modern Belarus. He graduated from Kacha Military Aviation School and Leningrad Institute of Aviation Instrumentation, working as geophysicist throughout 1970s and 80s.

In 1990, Mashkovtsev was elected secretary of the Petropavlovsk-Kamchatsky City Committee of the CPSU. From December 1991 to October 1993 he was a member of the Lesser Council of the Petropavlovsk City Council of People's Deputies.

In 1993 Mashkovtsev joined the newly created Communist Party of the Russian Federation, then becoming an assistant to the Communist deputy of the State Duma Gennady Seleznyov. In 1995 Mashkovtsev was elected Chairman of the Legislative Assembly of Kamchatka Oblast, and since December 1997 he worked as deputy chairman of the committee for the protection of citizens' rights and social issues.

== Governorship ==
On 17 December 2000, in the second round of the gubernatorial elections, Mashkovtsev won 46% of the votes defeating former vice governor of Kamchatka Oblast Boris Sinchenko (42%). Incumbent governor Vladimir Biryukov decided not to run.

By that time, an unsuccessful struggle with the energy crisis had been going on in Kamchatka for several years. Mashkovtsev administration managed to ensure that there were no interruptions in the supply of heating and electricity to Kamchatka since 2001.

On 27 October 2003, a criminal case was initiated against Mashkovtsev and his deputy Vladislav Skvortsov under Articles 285 and 286 of the Criminal Code of the Russian Federation (excess and abuse of office). The case was opened on the facts of misuse of 120 million rubles. As Mashkovtsev explained to journalists, the money was spent in the spring of 2002, when, under the Northern delivery program, fuel was purchased for Petropavlovsk-Kamchatsky and Yelizovo cities, which were not formally included in this program. In July 2005, the Kamchatka prosecutor's office terminated the criminal prosecution of the governor, reclassifying Mashkovtsev's actions from Articles 285 and 286 of the Criminal Code to Article 293 (negligence) and closing the case due to the expiration of the statute of limitations.

On 19 December 2004, he was elected for a new term. Mashkovtsev became the main initiator and executor of the project of unification of Kamchatka Oblast and Koryak Autonomous Okrug. On 23 October 2005, a referendum was held on the unification of the regions. Most of the participants in the referendum spoke in favor of unification, and from the beginning of 2006, the implementation of transitional measures began in the regions. After the referendum Mashkovtsev stated that he would not apply for the post of governor of the united Kamchatka Krai.

On 23 May 2007, Mashkovtsev resigned and was succeeded by Aleksey Kuzmitsky.

== Later activity ==
By 2008, Mashkovtsev moved to St. Petersburg. In November, the former governor, who had previously openly stated that the leader of the Communist Party Gennady Zyuganov was carrying out orders from the presidential administration, was admitted to the organization “Communists of Petersburg and the Leningrad Oblast”, which opposed itself to the Communist Party. In 2009, he joined the Communists of Russia, another breakaway party.

In 2019, Mashkovtsev was nominated for Governor of Saint Petersburg from the Communists of Russia, but was not allowed to run by the electoral authorities together with 18 other candidates. As the reasons, the election committee cited their failure to provide a number of documents necessary for registration, including 155 signatures of municipal deputies.

== Personal life and death ==
The wife of Mikhail Mashkovtsev, Tatiana Borisovna Mashkovtseva was a director of the school No. 34 of Petropavlovsk-Kamchatsky and English teacher. She died in 2007. Their daughters Elena and Victoria are also teachers. Mashkovtsev's hobby was preferans, a Russian card game.

Mashkovtsev died on 29 October 2022, at the age of 75.
