= Vladimir Solodov =

Russian politician (born 1982)

- Владимир Солодов
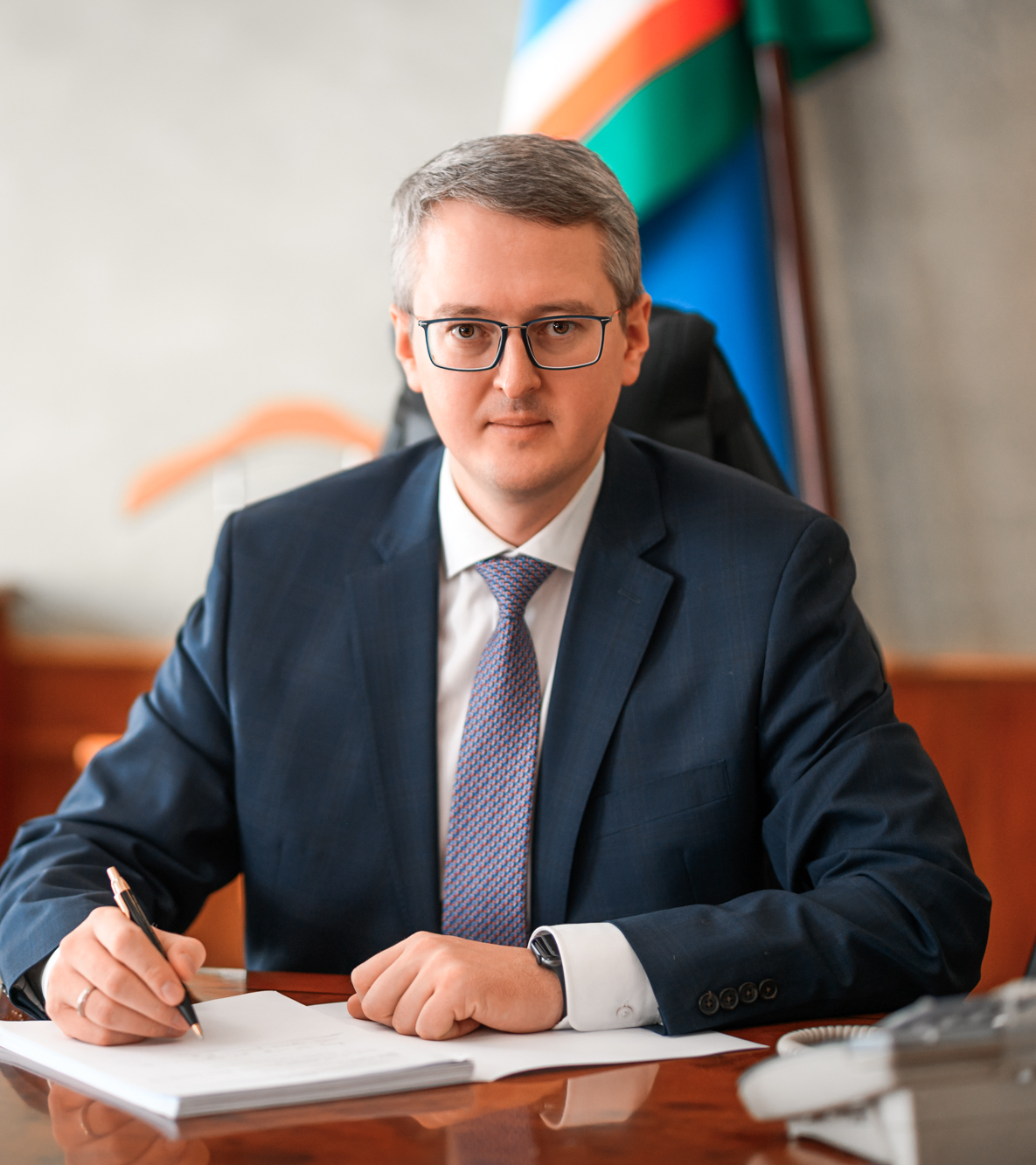
- Official portrait, 2019

3rd Governor of Kamchatka Krai
- Incumbent
- Assumed office 21 September 2020
- Preceded by: Vladimir Ilyukhin

Governor of Kamchatka Krai (acting)
- In office 3 April 2020 – 21 September 2020

Chairman of the Government of the Republic of Sakha
- In office 18 October 2018 – 3 April 2020
- Preceded by: Yevgeny Chekin
- Succeeded by: Aleksey Kolodeznikov (acting)

Chairman of the Government of the Republic of Sakha (acting)
- In office 29 June 2018 – 18 October 2018

Deputy Plenipotentiary Representative in the Far Eastern Federal District
- In office 6 April 2015 – 1 August 2017

Personal details
- Born: 26 July 1982 (age 44) Moscow, Russian SFSR, Soviet Union
- Education: Moscow State University

Vladimir Viktorovich Solodov (Russian: Владимир Викторович Солодов; born 26 July 1982) is a Russian politician who has been the Governor of Kamchatka Krai since 21 September 2020. Previously, Solodov was Kamchatka Krai's acting governor from 3 April until 21 September 2020. He was previously the chairman of the Government of the Republic of Sakha (Yakutia) from 2018 to 2020.

== Biography ==
Vladimir Solodov was born in Moscow on 26 July 1982. In 2002, he studied at the Institute of Political Science in Paris, France, and later graduated from Moscow State University's Faculty for Public Administration in 2004. From 2004 to 2007, he studied at the graduate school of Moscow State University. In 2007, Solodov defended his thesis on "Electronic government as a tool for transforming public administration."

From 2005 to 2013, he was a teacher and researcher at the Faculty of Public Administration of Moscow State University. He rose from an assistant to an associate professor of the Department of Theory and Practice of Management while at the university. Next, he led the Centre for New Technologies of Public Administration and was engaged in work for the organization of project activities such as the development, progression, and launch of training programs for civil servants.

In 2013, he led the Department of Projects and Practices of the "Young Professionals" for the Agency for Strategic Initiative. Solodov selected and supported projects in the field of professional development, and took part in the launch of the Global Education Program. He also participated in the organization of sessions on the development of projects prioritizing development areas of the Far East.

On 6 April 2015, Solodov was appointed Deputy Plenipotentiary Representative in the Far Eastern Federal District, along with Yury Trutnev. He supervised issues concerning social and economic policy, as well as the implementation of public projects and patriotic education.

On 1 August 2017, he was appointed chairman of the board of directors of the Far East Development Fund (founder – Vnesheconombank). Solodov took an active part in the work on systemically increasing the attractiveness of regions for investment, removing administrative barriers to existing and established enterprises, including residents of the territories of advanced social and economic development and the free port of Vladivostok.

On 26 June 2018, Solodov was appointed Acting Chairman of the Government of the Republic of Sakha (Yakutia). On 18 October 2018, he was appointed and confirmed as Chairman of the Government of the Republic of Sakha (Yakutia).

=== Governor of Kamchatka Krai ===
On 3 April 2020, Solodov was appointed acting Governor of Kamchatka Krai. In July 2020, during the election of the governor of the Kamchatka Krai, Solodov was registered as a self-nominated candidate. In the elections held on 13 September 2020, Solodov received 80.51% of the vote with a turnout of 37.15% of the total number of registered voters and was thus elected in the first round. His inauguration took place and was sworn in office on 21 September 2020. He was reelected in 2025.

=== Scientific activity ===
Solodov has authored and/or co-author of more than 30 articles on public administration, including "E-Government and the fight against corruption" (2006), "Electronic bureaucracy: post-bureaucracy or super-bureaucracy" (2007), "Mobile services as a tool to improve the quality of public services" (2009), "Modelling consumer behaviour" (2012).

=== Sanctions ===
On 24 February 2023, the US State Department included Solodov in the sanctions list of persons involved in "the implementation of Russian operations and aggression against Ukraine, as well as the illegal management of occupied Ukrainian territories in the interests of the Russian Federation", in particular, for "inciting citizens to war in Ukraine.
