= Kamchatka Oblast =

Former federal subject of Russia

Coordinates: 55°00′N 159°00′E

Kamchatka Oblast Камчатская область (Russian)
- Oblast of Russia
- 1932–2007
- Flag Coat of arms

- Location of Kamchatka Oblast in Russia prior to 2007 merger
- Capital: Petropavlovsk-Kamchatsky
- History
  - Established: 30 October 1932
  - Disestablished: 1 July 2007
Preceded by	Succeeded by
Far Eastern Krai	Kamchatka Krai
- Today part of: Russia

Kamchatka Oblast (Russian: Камча́тская о́бласть, romanized: Kamchatskaya oblast) was, until being incorporated into Kamchatka Krai on July 1, 2007, a federal subject of Russia (an oblast). To the north, it bordered Magadan Oblast and Chukotka Autonomous Okrug. Koryak Okrug was located in the northern part of the oblast. Including the autonomous okrug, the total area of the oblast was 472,300 square kilometres (182,400 sq mi), encompassing the southern half of the Kamchatka Peninsula. The administrative center of Kamchatka Oblast was the city of Petropavlovsk-Kamchatsky. Population: 358,801 (2002 census); 466,096 (1989 Soviet census).

Kamchatka's natural resources include coal, gold, mica, pyrites, and natural gas. Most of the inhabitants live in the administrative center, Petropavlovsk-Kamchatsky. The main employment sectors are fishing, forestry, tourism (a growing industry), and the Russian military. There is still a large military presence on the peninsula; the home base of Russia's Pacific submarine fleet is across Avacha Bay from Petropavlovsk-Kamchatsky at the Rybachy base. There are also several air force bases and radar sites in Kamchatka.

As of the 2002 All-Russian Population Census, the majority of the 358,801 population is Russian (290,108), largest minorities are Ukrainian (20,870) and Koryak (7,328). The northern part of the peninsula is occupied by Koryak Autonomous Okrug, where around 6,700 Koryaks live. A small number of Evens also live here.

The oblast was established on October 20, 1932, subordinated to the Far Eastern Krai (later Khabarovsk Krai). In 1956, it became a separate oblast under its own jurisdiction.

== Chairmen ==
The Chairman of the Council of People's Deputies of Kamchatka Oblast was the presiding officer of that legislature 1997–2007. They were preceded by The Chairman of the Legislative Assembly of Kamchatka Oblast 1995–1997.

Name	Took office	Left office
Mikhail Mashkovtsev	1995	1997
Lev Boitsov	1997	2001
Nikolay Tokmantsev	2001	2007
