= Legislative Assembly of Kamchatka Krai =

Regional parliament of Kamchatka Krai, Russia

Legislative Assembly of Kamchatka Krai Законодательное собрание Камчатского Края
- 4th legislature

Type
- Type: Unicameral
- Term limits: 5 years

History
- Founded: 14 December 2007

Leadership
- Chairman: Irina Untilova, United Russia since 2021

Structure
- Seats: 28
- Political groups: United Russia (18) CPRF (5); SRZP (1); LDPR (1); CPCR (1); RPPSJ (1) New People (1)

Elections
- Voting system: Mixed
- Last election: 19 September 2021
- Next election: 2026

Meeting place
- 1 Lenin Square, Petropavlovsk-Kamchatsky

Website
- www.zaksobr.kamchatka.ru

The Legislative Assembly of Kamchatka Krai (Russian: Законодательное собрание Камчатского Края) is the regional parliament of Kamchatka Krai, a federal subject of Russia. Together with the executive and judicial branches, the Krai's legislative assembly is vested with power to control the krai's own affairs with moderate levels of autonomy from Moscow. All members are elected by public vote and are titled as deputies. The term of the deputies are currently 5 years long.

== History ==
Kamchatka Oblast was formed on 2 December 1849 with Major-General Vasily Zavoyko appointed as its first governor. Due to its remote location and distance from the main seat of the Russian government, the administrative duties of Kamchatka was reorganized several times and even administrated from places like Amur and Primorsky. After the Soviets came into power, elections were carried out to fill up the revolutionary legislative and executive committees. In 1936, through the Soviet Union constitution, the power of the Kamchatka Regional Council of Workers' Deputies were limited down to executive and administrative duties while the Supreme Soviet of RSFSR took over legislative duties. In 1977, the council was renamed the Kamchatka Regional Council of People's Deputies. During the Russian constitutional crisis of 1993, the legislative body of Russia was dissolved and power was decentralized to the individual federal subjects by a presidential decree (No. 1617). The Legislative Assembly of Kamchatka Oblast and the Duma of Koryak Autonomous Okrug was thus formed in Kamchatka Oblast and Koryak Autonomous Okrug separately respectively. Following a referendum on the question of unification on 23 October 2005, the two entities were thus merged on 1 July 2007 to form Kamchatka Krai, but the respective legislative bodies continued to work separately for about five months till they were merged as well.

== Structure ==
The Legislative Assembly of Kamchatka Krai is unicameral just like most legislative assembly bodies found in other Russian federal subjects. It currently comprises 28 deputies, with 14 of them running in multi-seat constituencies and the other 14 in the single electoral district. Deputies are elected by public vote once every 5 years, whereby winners are determined by a combination of two voting systems, which are the first-past-the-post voting and party-list proportional representation, in what is known as the parallel voting system. The Duma also internally elects a legislative representative to the Federation Council, which is the Upper House of Russia's legislative branch.

The executive branch of Kamchatka works closely with the Legislative Assembly. The executive branch is also known as the government of Kamchatka and is headed by the Governor, who is the highest ranking person in the krai. The Governor is not to be confused with the Chairman of the Legislative Assembly, who is head of the Legislative Assembly only.

== Previous legislative assemblies ==
| Convocation | Results and development |
Legislative Assembly of Kamchatka Oblast (1995–1997)
| I | The election for the deputies were held in 3 phases, on 20 March 1994, 23 October 1994 and 26 March 1995 for 9, 4 and 8 deputies respectively for a total of 21 positions. The first session of the first convocation was held between 11 and 13 April 1995, for which Mikhail Mashkovtsev was chosen to be the chairman through a secret vote among the deputies. Within the 2.5-year term of the deputies, 108 laws were adopted, most of which formed the basic laws of the oblast. |
Council of People's Deputies of Kamchatka Oblast (1997–2007)
| II | The election for 47 positions within the renamed legislative assembly was held on 30 November 1997. This time Lev Boitsov was chosen to lead as the chairman of the council. Subsequently, 116 laws were adopted with a special emphasis on the society. |
| III | The election for 39 positions within the council was held on 2 December 2001. This time Nikolay Tokmantsev was chosen to lead as the chairman of the council. Subsequently, 460 laws were adopted within the 6-year term of the deputies. |

| Convocation | Results and development |
Duma of Koryak Autonomous Okrug (1994–2007)
| I | The election for the first convocation took place in March 1994 for 8 positions, with Alexander Vasilyevich heading the duma as its first chairman. During the two-year term, 26 laws were adopted. |
| II | In November 1996, the elections for the second convocation took place with 12 deputies elected. Vladimir Nikolaevich was selected as its second chairman. 153 laws were adopted during the second convocation. |
| III | On 2 December 2000, the elections for the third convocation took place. Vladimir Ivanovich was selected as its third chairman, but was later replaced by Nina Ivanovna. 375 laws were adopted during the third convocation. |
| IV | In March 2004, the elections for the fourth convocation took place. Nina Ivanovna was re-selected as the chairman, but was later replaced by Myshlyayev Alekseevich. 319 laws were adopted during the fourth convocation. |

| Convocation | Results and development |
Legislative Assembly of Kamchatka Krai (2007–present)
| I | On 2 December 2007, the election for the first convocation of the new legislative assembly took place. In all, 50 deputies were elected, 27 from single regional constituencies, 13 from single mandate constituencies and 10 from mixed mandate constituencies that were administrated under the new special territory of Koryak. Boris Nevzorov was elected as the chairman of the legislative assembly during its first session on 14 December 2007. This transitional period saw the integration of the laws of both entities. 7 standing committees and 1 commission were also created, on issues such as economics, building, transportation, agrarian, citizens' rights, health, minority rights and regulations. 743 laws were adopted during the first convocation. |
| II | In December 2011, the election for the second convocation took place. 27 deputies were elected to serve the 5 years term. Valery Raenko was elected to be the chairman. 1387 resolutions were approved, of which 839 were related to the laws of Kamchatka. |
| III | On 18 September 2016, the election for the third convocation took place. 28 deputies were elected and Valery Raenko was re-elected to be the chairman again. Five permanent committees, formed during the early days of the assembly, were consolidated during this time. The aim for the third convocation was to provide legal support for the sustainable development and quality of life in Kamchatka up till 2025 especially in the social and economic areas. |
