= Kamchatka Krai =

First-level administrative division of Russia

Kamchatka Krai Камчатский край (Russian)
- Krai
- Flag Coat of arms
- Anthem: Anthem of Kamchatka Krai
- Coordinates: 56°00′N 159°00′E
- Country: Russia
- Federal district: Far Eastern
- Economic region: Far Eastern
- Established: 1 July 2007
- Administrative center: Petropavlovsk-Kamchatsky

Government
  - Body: Legislative Assembly
  - Governor: Vladimir Solodov

Area
  - Total: 464,275 km^{2} (179,258 sq mi)
  - Rank: 10th

Population (2021 census)
  - Total: 291,705
  - Estimate (2018): 315,557
  - Rank: 77th
  - Density: 0.628302/km^{2} (1.62730/sq mi)
  - Urban: 77.8%
  - Rural: 22.2%

GDP (nominal, 2024)
  - Total: ₽440 billion (US$5.16 billion)
  - Per capita: ₽1.52 million (US$17,881.16)
- Time zone: UTC+12 (MSK+9)
- ISO 3166 code: RU-KAM
- License plates: 41, 82
- OKTMO ID: 30000000
- Official languages: Russian
- Website: https://www.kamgov.ru/

Kamchatka Krai (Note: Russian: Камча́тский край, romanized: Kamchatskiy kray, IPA: [kɐmˈtɕatskʲɪj kraj]) is a federal subject of Russia (a krai), situated in the Russian Far East. It is administratively part of the Far Eastern Federal District. Its administrative center and largest city is Petropavlovsk-Kamchatsky, home to over half of its population of 291,705 (2021 census).

Kamchatka Krai was formed on 1 July 2007, as a result of the merger of Kamchatka Oblast and Koryak Autonomous Okrug, based on the voting in a referendum on the issue on 23 October 2005. The okrug retains the status of a special administrative division of the krai, under the name of Koryak Okrug.

The Kamchatka Peninsula forms the majority of the krai's territory, separating the Sea of Okhotsk and the Bering Sea in the Pacific Ocean. The remainder is formed by a minor northern mainland portion, Karaginsky Island, and the Commander Islands in the Bering Sea. It is bordered by Magadan Oblast to the west and Chukotka Autonomous Okrug to the north. Kamchatka Krai is an active volcanic zone that is home to Kluchevskaya, the highest active volcano in Eurasia, and the Decade Volcanoes of Avachinsky and Koryaksky.

== Geography ==
Kamchatka Krai occupies the territory of the Kamchatka Peninsula, the adjacent part of the mainland, the island Karaginsky and the Commander Islands. It is bounded to the east by the Bering Sea of the Pacific Ocean (a coastline of more than 2,000 kilometers (1,200 mi)) and to the west by the Okhotsk Sea (a coastline of approximately 2,000 km (1,200 mi)).

Mountain ranges: Sredinny Range (about 900 km (560 mi) long), Eastern Range (about 600 km (370 mi) long), and the Koryak Mountains, with the Ukelayat Range, Vetvey Range, Penzhinsky, Pahachinsky, Pylgin, and Olyutor ranges. Heights: Khuvkhoitun (2,613 m (8,573 ft)), Ledyanaya (2,562 m (8,406 ft)), Acute (2,552 m (8,373 ft)), Shishel (2,531 m (8,304 ft)), Tylele volcano (2,234 m (7,329 ft)).

The longest rivers are the Vyvenka, Penzhina, Talovka, Lakhacha, Apuka, Kamchatka, and Ukelayat.

The largest freshwater lakes are Kronotskoye, Talovskoye, and Palanskoye. A smaller lake Khalaktyrskoye Lake is located close to Petropavlovsk-Kamchatsky.

Peninsulas: Olyutor Peninsula, Gavena Peninsula, Ilpinsky Peninsula, Ozernoy Peninsula, Kamchatskiy Peninsula, Shipunskiy Peninsula, and the Yelistratova Peninsula.

Islands (NW-NE going clockwise): Verkhoturov Island, Karaginsky Island, the Commander Islands, Ptichy Island (Kamchatka Krai), Konus Island, Zubchaty Island, Rovny Island, Dobrzhanskogo Island, Vtoroy Island, Krayniy Island and Trety Island. Despite their proximity, the Kuril Islands are not part of Kamchatka Krai, falling instead under Sakhalin Oblast.

Kamchatka is located in a zone of volcanic activity, around 300 large and medium-sized volcanoes are located within its borders, 29 of which are active. This includes the largest volcano in Eurasia, Mount Kluchevskaya (altitude 4,750 m (15,580 ft)). Kamchatka's latitude is similar to that of Scotland, but its climate is rated as subarctic. Its also prone to monsoons, sweeping in from the Pacific Ocean.

=== Nature ===
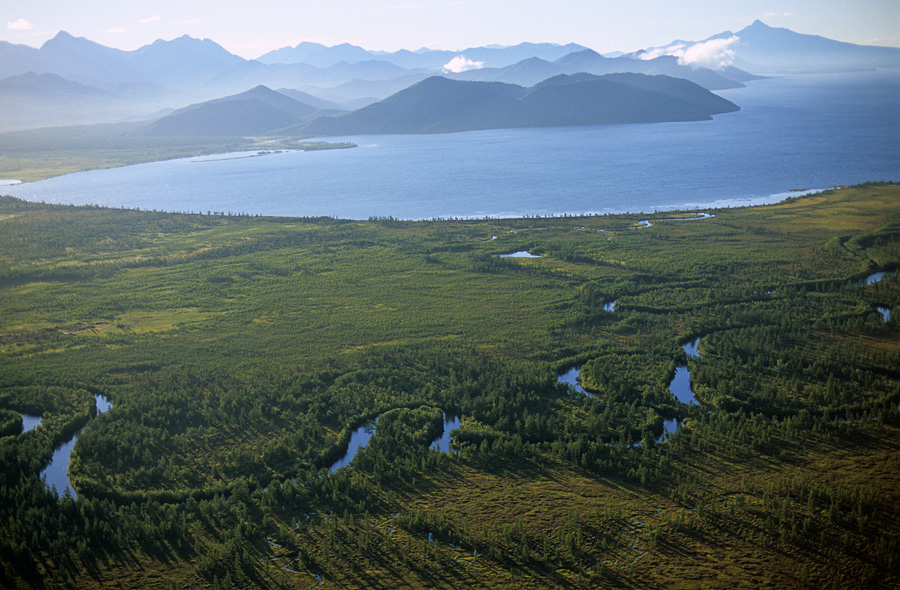
Lake Kronotskoye

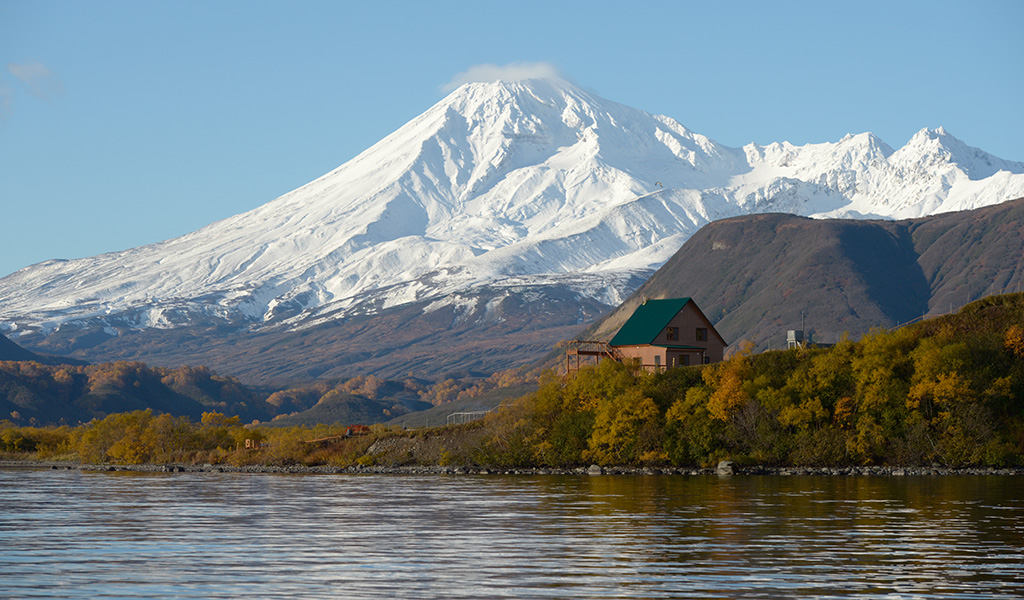
Kambalny stratovolcano

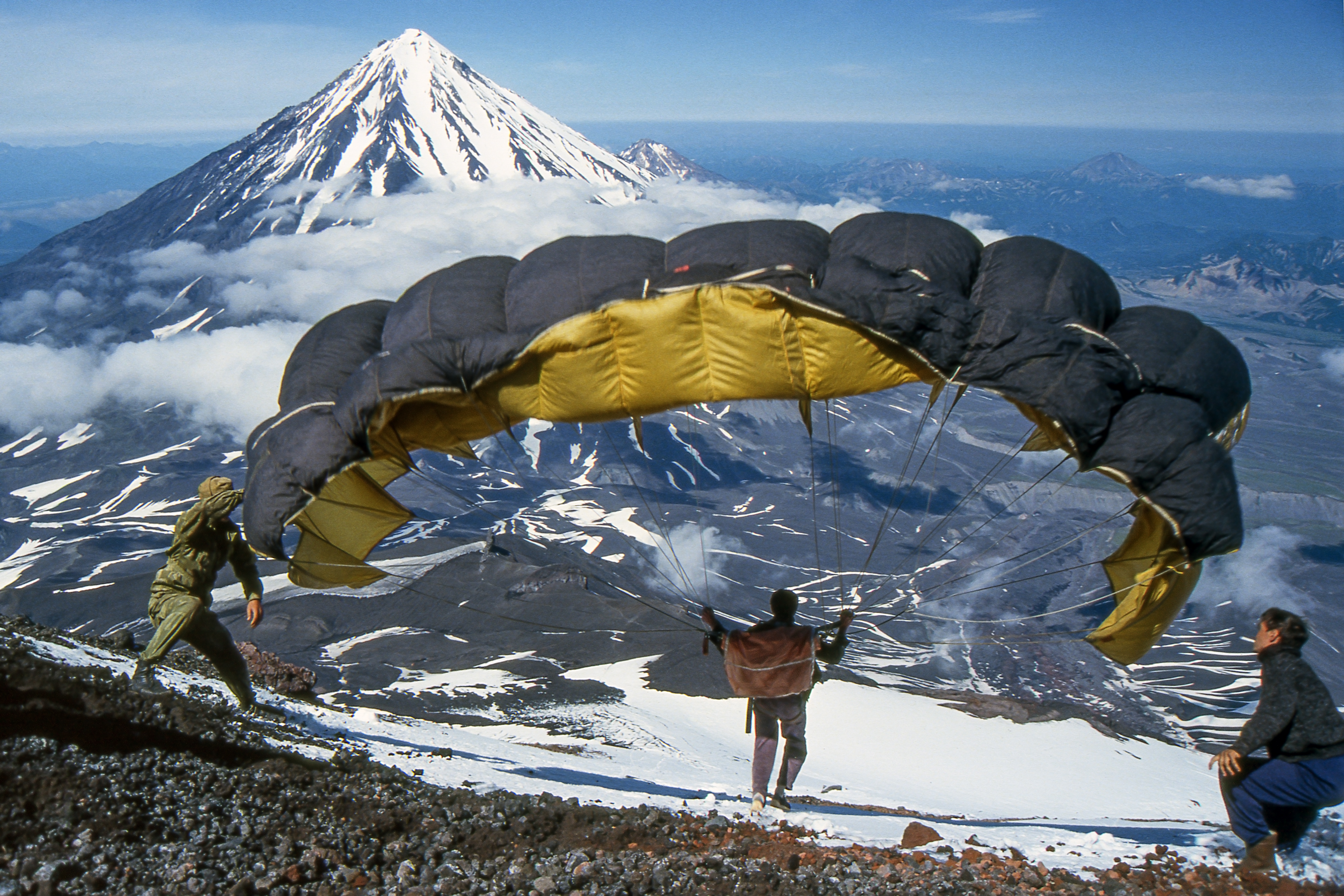
Koryaksky volcano

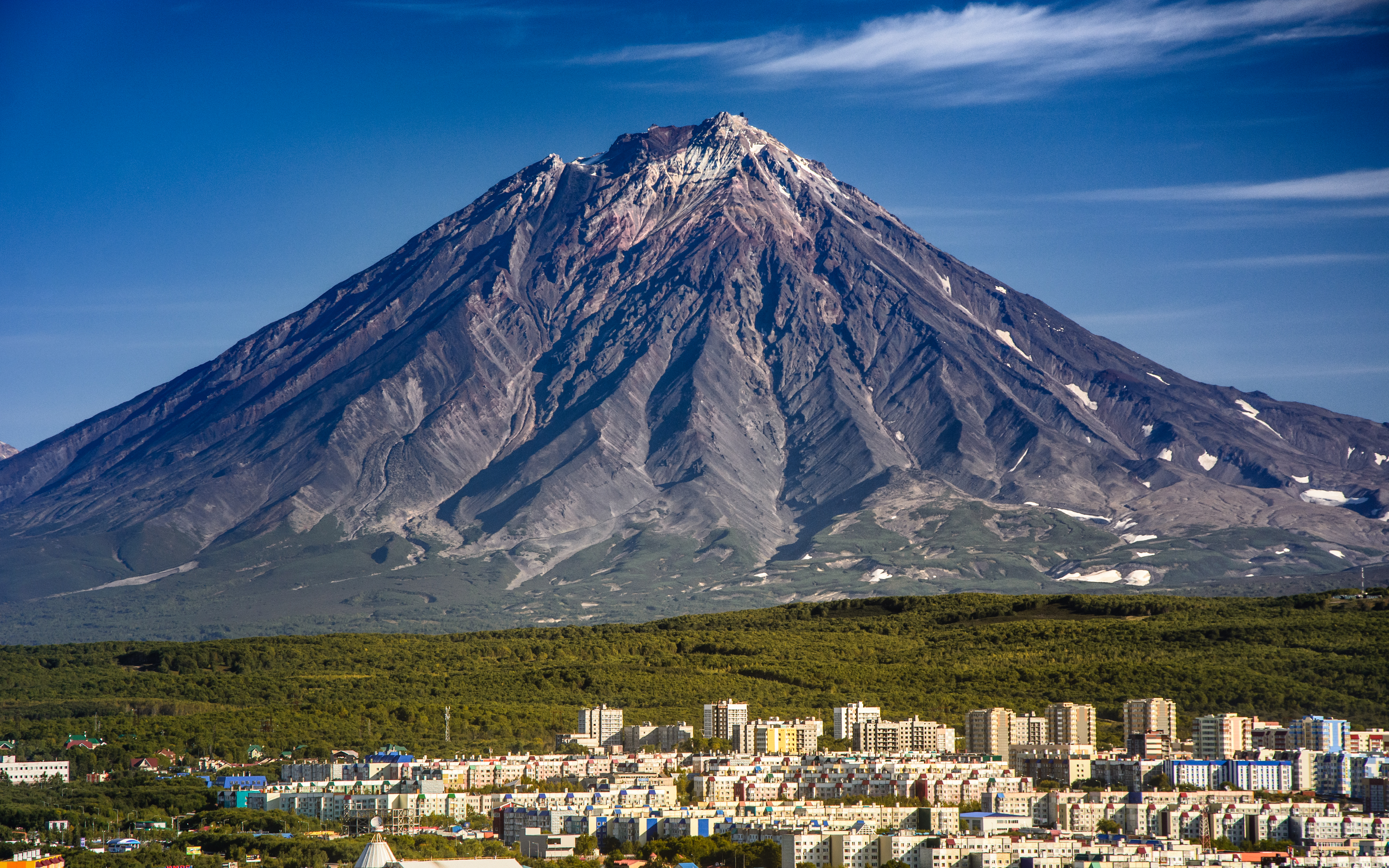
Koryaksky volcano towering over Petropavlovsk-Kamchatsky

Most of the peninsula is covered with forests of stone birch, while alder and cedar elfin are commonly found at higher altitudes. In central areas, especially in the Kamchatka River valley, widespread forests of larch and spruce can be found. In floodplains, forests grow with fragrant poplar, alder, Salix arbutifolia, and Sakhalin willow. In the second tier, undergrowth such as the common hawthorn, Asian cherry, Kamchatka rowan, and shrubs growing Kamchatka elderberries, Kamchatka honeysuckle, meadowsweet, willow shrubs, and many other species.

More than 14.5% of the territory of the Kamchatka Territory is specially protected. There are six protected areas of federal significance (three-state reserves, one federal reserve "South Kamchatka," two spa areas – "Resort Paratunka," "Malkinskie mineral waters"); four natural parks of regional significance ("Nalychevo," "Bystrinsky," "South Kamchatka," "Kluchevskoy"); 22 reserves of regional importance; 116 monuments of nature; four protected areas (landscape natural park "Blue Lake," Southwest and Tundra Sobolewski reserves).

Kronotsky Nature Reserve is a nature area reserved for the study of natural sciences in the remote Russian Far East, on the coast of the Kamchatka Peninsula. It was created in 1934 and its current boundary contains an area of 10,990 km^{2} (4,240 sq mi). It also has Russia's only geyser basin, plus several mountain ranges with numerous volcanoes, both active and extinct. Due to its often harsh climate and its mix of volcanoes and geysers, it is frequently described as the "Land of Fire and Ice".

It is mainly accessible only to scientists, plus approximately 3,000 tourists annually who pay a fee equivalent to US$700 to travel by helicopter for a single day's visit. Kronotsky Nature Reserve has been proclaimed a World Heritage Site by UNESCO.

=== Climate ===
Average daily maximum and minimum temperatures for selected locations in Kamchatka Russia
| City | July (°C) | July (°F) | January (°C) | January (°F) |
|---|---|---|---|---|
| Klyuchi | 20.7/11.1 | 69/52 | -12.9/-20.4 | 9/-5 |
| Kamenskoye | 19.1/8.8 | 66/48 | −20.8/−28.2 | -5/-19 |
| Ossora | 16.4/9.3 | 62/49 | −11/−20.1 | 12/−4 |
| Petropavlovsk-Kamchatsky | 16.5/10 | 62/50 | −4.4/−9.2 | 24/15 |
| Bering Island | 10.7/7.7 | 51/46 | −2/−5.5 | 28/22 |

== Legislative assembly ==
The legislative assembly was formed in 2007 after the merger of Kamchatka Oblast and Koryak Autonomous Okrug. It therefore replaced the Council of People's Deputies of Kamchatka Oblast (1997–2007) and the Duma of Koryak Autonomous Okrug (1994–2007).

The Chairman of the Legislative Assembly of Kamchatka Krai is the presiding officer of that legislature:

| Name | Took office | Left office |
|---|---|---|
| Boris Aleksandrovich Nevzorov | 2007 | 2011 |
| Valery Fedorovich Raenko | 2011 | 2021 |
| Irina Untilova | 2021 | To Present |

== Economy ==
The main industries in Kamchatka include fishing and forestry. Coal and other raw materials are extracted. Due to its geographical location near major shipping routes, it is a center for shipbuilding, ship repair, and related services. There are also oil and mineral resources which are yet to be fully developed.

The largest companies in the region include Kamchatskenergo (power distribution company with revenues of $257.1 million in 2017), Oceanrybflot (fishing company, $248.53 million), Morskoy Trast ($197.11 million), Amethystvoye Mining and Processing Combine (gold mine, part of Renova Group, $171.4 million).

== Demographics ==
Historical population
| Year | Pop. | ±% |
|---|---|---|
| 1926 | 34,958 | — |
| 1939 | 109,300 | +212.7% |
| 1959 | 220,753 | +102.0% |
| 1970 | 287,612 | +30.3% |
| 1979 | 378,491 | +31.6% |
| 1989 | 466,096 | +23.1% |
| 2002 | 358,801 | −23.0% |
| 2010 | 322,079 | −10.2% |
| 2021 | 291,705 | −9.4% |
Source: Census data

Population: 291,705 (2021 census); 322,079 (2010 census); 358,801 (2002 census); 466,096 (1989 Soviet census).

Vital statistics for 2024:

- Births: 2,736 (9.5 per 1,000)
- Deaths: 3,698 (12.8 per 1,000)

Total fertility rate (2024):
1.58 children per woman

Life expectancy (2021):

Total: 68.09 years (male: 63.76; female: 72.93)

=== Ethnic composition ===
There were 110 recognized ethnic groups in the krai as of 2021. Indigenous peoples made up only 5% of the total population.

| Ethnicity | Population | Percentage |
|---|---|---|
| Russians | 233,198 | 88.3% |
| Koryaks | 6,413 | 2.4% |
| Ukrainians | 3,873 | 1.5% |
| Itelmens | 1,910 | 0.7% |
| Evens | 1,777 | 0.7% |
| Uzbeks | 1,706 | 0.6% |
| Kyrgyz | 1,407 | 0.5% |
| Tatars | 1,351 | 0.5% |
| Kamchadals | 1,311 | 0.5% |
| Chukchi | 1,222 | 0.5% |
| Others | 9,934 | 3.8% |

- 27,603 people were registered from administrative databases, and could not declare an ethnicity. It is estimated that the proportion of ethnicities in this group is the same as that of the declared group.

=== Religion ===
According to a 2012 survey, 31.2% of the population of Kamchatka adhere to the Russian Orthodox Church, 4.4% are unaffiliated Christians, 0.8% are Orthodox Christians who do not belong to the Russian Orthodox Church. Two percent of the population adhere to the Slavic native faith or Siberian shamanism, 1.2% to Islam, 0.6% to forms of Protestantism, and 0.4% to Hinduism. In addition, 22.8% of the population declare themselves to be spiritual but not religious, 21% are atheist, and 14.8% follows other religions or did not give an answer to the question.

Religion in Kamchatka Krai as of 2012 (Sreda Arena Atlas)
| Russian Orthodoxy | 31.2% |
| Other Orthodox | 0.8% |
| Protestantism | 0.6% |
| Other Christians | 5.2% |
| Islam | 1.2% |
| Rodnovery and other native faiths | 2.4% |
| Spiritual but not religious | 22.8% |
| Atheism and irreligion | 21.0% |
| Other and undeclared | 14.8% |

== See also ==
- List of Chairmen of the Legislative Assembly of Kamchatka Krai
- Nikolskaya sopka
- Petropavlovsk-Kamchatsky
