= Administrative divisions of Kamchatka Oblast =

Kamchatka Oblast Russia
- Administrative centre: Petropavlovsk-Kamchatsky

Administrative structure (as of 30 June 2007)
- Districts: 7
- Cities/towns: 3
- Urban-type settlements: 4
- Selsovets: 24

Municipal structure (as of 2002)
- Rural settlements: 55 (inhabited); 9 (uninhabited)

Kamchatka Oblast was a federal subject of Russia until 30 June 2007. On 1 July 2007, it was merged with Koryak Autonomous Okrug to form Kamchatka Krai.

== Administrative and municipal divisions ==
- Towns under the federal government management:
  - Vilyuchinsk (Вилючинск)
- Cities and towns under the oblast's jurisdiction:
  - Petropavlovsk-Kamchatsky (Петропавловск-Камчатский) (administrative center)
  - Yelizovo (Елизово)
- Districts:
  - Aleutsky (Алеутский)
  - Bystrinsky (Быстринский)
  - Milkovsky (Мильковский)
    - with 7 rural okrugs under the district's jurisdiction.
  - Sobolevsky (Соболевский)
    - with 4 rural okrugs under the district's jurisdiction.
  - Ust-Bolsheretsky (Усть-Большерецкий)
    - Urban-type settlements under the district's jurisdiction:
      - Oktyabrsky (Октябрьский)
      - Ozernovsky (Озерновский)
    - with 4 rural okrugs under the district's jurisdiction.
  - Ust-Kamchatsky (Усть-Камчатский)
    - Urban-type settlements under the district's jurisdiction:
      - Ust-Kamchatsk (Усть-Камчатск)
    - with 1 rural okrug under the district's jurisdiction.
  - Yelizovsky (Елизовский)
    - Urban-type settlements under the district's jurisdiction:
      - Vulkanny (Вулканный)
    - with 8 rural okrugs under the district's jurisdiction.

== See also ==
- Administrative divisions of Koryak Autonomous Okrug
- Administrative divisions of Kamchatka Krai
