= Flag of Kamchatka Krai =

Flag of the Russian krai of Kamchatka

Kamchatka Krai
- Proportion: 2:3
- Adopted: 17 February 2010
- Design: A horizontal bicolour of white and blue with the emblem of the krai.
- Designed by: Ivan Tsarkov

The flag of Kamchatka Krai, in the Russian Federation, is a horizontal bicolour of white and blue charged with an emblem. The emblem is a modification of the coat of arms of Kamchatka Krai: three snow-capped volcano peaks on the backdrop of a red sun framed by an ornament.

The flag was adopted on 17 February 2010 by the Legislative Assembly of Kamchatka Krai, and came into use 1 July 2010.

Before 2007, the territory that is now Kamchatka Krai was two federal subjects called Kamchatka Oblast and Koryak Autonomous Okrug and thus their respective flags were used instead.

== Other flags ==
Flag	Date	Use	Description
	?–2007	Flag of the Koryak Okrug	
	?–2007	Flag of the Kamchatka Oblast	
	2015–Present	Flag of Petropavlovsk-Kamchatsky	
	2006–2015	Flag of Petropavlovsk-Kamchatsky	
	?–Present	Flag of Vilyuchinsk	
	?–Present	Flag of Yelizovo	
	?–Present	Flag of Aleutsky District	
	?–Present	Flag of Bystrinsky District	
	?–Present	Flag of Yelizovsky District	
	?–Present	Flag of Sobolevsky District	
	?–Present	Flag Ust-Bolsheretsky District	
	?–Present	Flag of Ust-Kamchatsky District	
	?–Present	Flag of Karaginsky District	
	?–Present	Flag of Olyutorsky District	
	?–Present	Flag of Penzhinsky District	
	?–Present	Flag of Tigilsky District	
	?–Present	Flag of Palana	
