= Administrative divisions of Koryak Autonomous Okrug =

Administrative districts of former Russian federal subject

Koryak Autonomous Okrug Russia
- Administrative center: Palana

Administrative structure (as of June 30, 2007)
- Districts: 4
- Cities/towns: 0
- Urban-type settlements: 2
- Selsovets: 0

Municipal structure (as of 2002)
- Rural settlements: 28 (inhabited); 1 (uninhabited)

Koryak Autonomous Okrug was a federal subject of Russia until June 30, 2007. On July 1, 2007 it was merged with Kamchatka Oblast to form Kamchatka Krai. After the merger, it retains a status of an administrative division within Kamchatka Krai.

== Administrative and municipal divisions ==
- Districts:
  - Karaginsky (Карагинский)
    - Urban-type settlements under the district's jurisdiction:
      - Ossora (Оссора)
  - Olyutorsky (Олюторский)
  - Penzhinsky (Пенжинский)
  - Tigilsky (Тигильский)
    - Urban-type settlements under the district's jurisdiction:
      - Palana (Палана) (administrative center)

== See also ==
- Administrative divisions of Kamchatka Oblast
- Administrative divisions of Kamchatka Krai
