= Ossora =

Ossora Оссора
- Selo
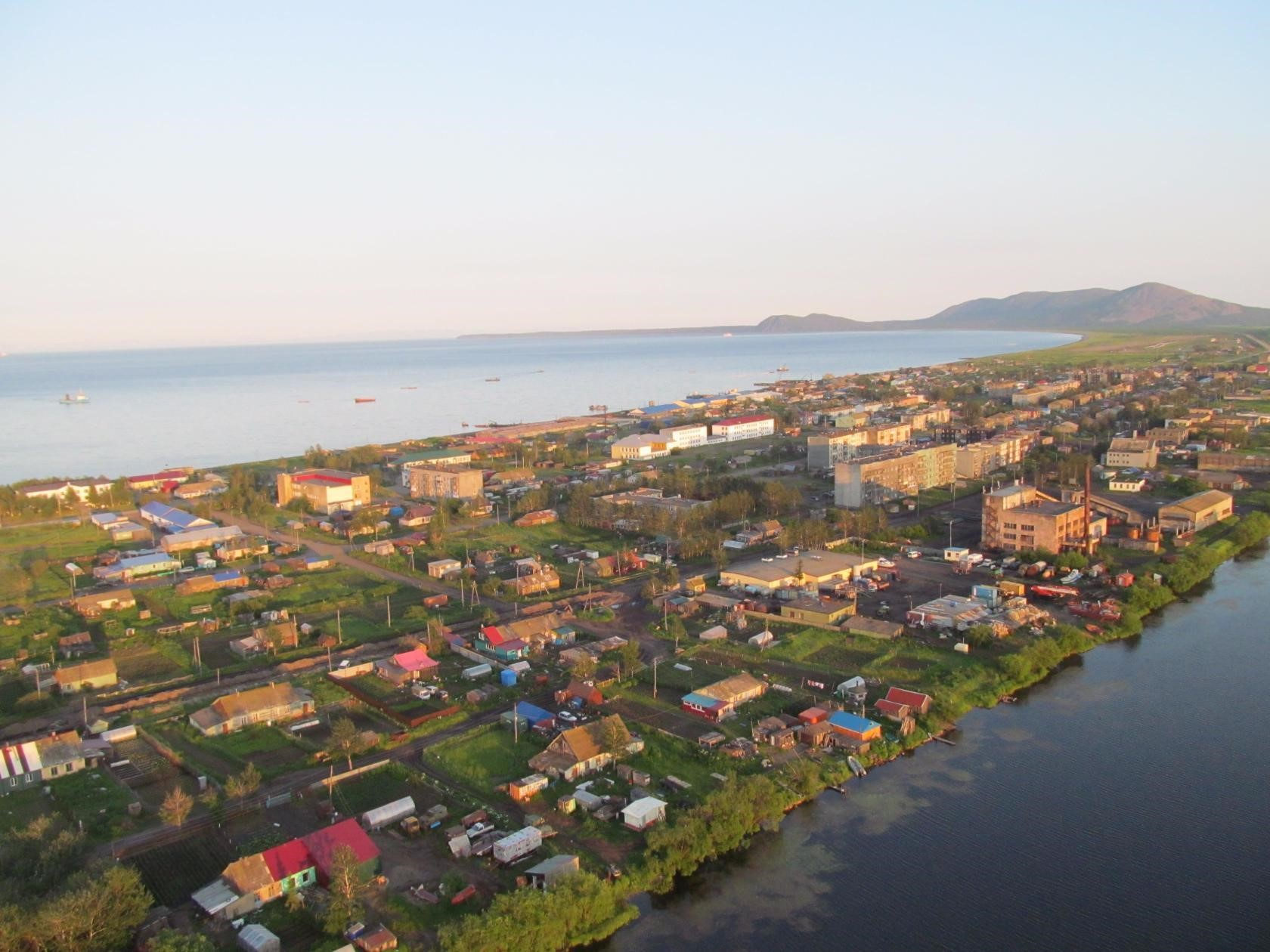
- Aerial view above Ossora
- Interactive map of Ossora
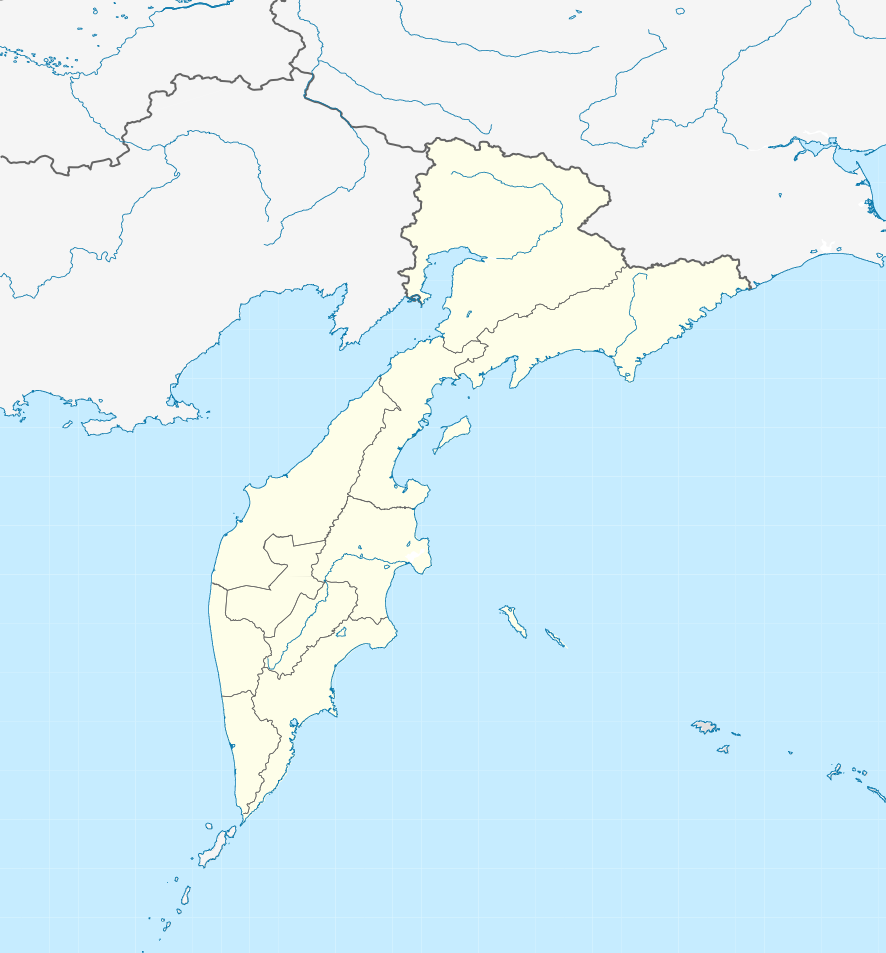
- Location of Ossora Ossora (Kamchatka Krai)
- Coordinates: 59°14′49″N 163°3′45″E
- Country: Russia
- Federal subject: Kamchatka Krai
- Administrative district: Karaginsky District
- Founded: 1937
- Elevation: 3 m (9.8 ft)

Population (2010 Census)
  - Total: 2,133
  - Estimate (2021): 1,841 (−13.7%)

Administrative status
  - Capital of: Karaginsky District
- Time zone: UTC+12 (MSK+9)
- Postal code: 688700
- Dialing code: +7 41545
- OKTMO ID: 30824151101

Ossora (Russian: Оссора; Koryak: Асоран, Asoran) is a selo and the administrative center of Karaginsky District of Koryak Okrug of Kamchatka Krai, Russia. Population: 2,133 (2010 census); 2,589 (2002 census); 4,074 (1989 Soviet census). Until 2012, Ossora was an urban locality (an urban-type settlement).

The distance to Petropavlovsk-Kamchatsky by air is 990 km. Ossora has no road connection to the outside world.

== Etymology ==
The name of the village is translated from the Koryak (Alutor) language. Asoran means "house of pink salmon" (i.e., the spawning ground of pink salmon).

== History ==
In 1934, the district executive committee and the district party committee petitioned to relocate the district center from the village of Karaga to a new location due to its location in marshy terrain, 25 km from the coast.

In 1936, the Far East Executive Committee organized the "North Kamchatka Expedition for the Settlement of the Peoples of the North", tasked with conducting land management in the Karaginsky, Bystrinsky, and Ust-Kamchatsky districts of Kamchatka Krai and finding a site for a new future district center. To find the site for the future district center, the expedition commission inspected more than five potential locations. The choice fell on the coast of Ossora Bay.

In accordance with the resolution of the Presidium of the Far East Executive Committee of December 8, 1936, the relocation of the district center was approved and submitted to the All-Russian Central Executive Committee for consideration.

In 1937, the Council of People's Commissars of the RSFSR allocated funds to the Karaginsky District Executive Committee for the construction of the settlement of Ossora, including it in the list of capital construction projects. The first buildings in Ossora were small huts or organizational buildings (the district executive committee, the CPSU district committee, and the post office) built from local willow, with low ceilings and small windows.

The final decision to relocate the district center was made only on August 18, 1942. On that day, a meeting of the district executive committee was held, deciding to locate the district offices in Ossora. By 1942, its population numbered 450.

On May 15, 1948, the district center of the Karaginsky District was moved from the village of Karaga to the village of Ossora by Decision No. 78 of the Koryak Okrug Executive Committee.

On August 8, 1949, by Decree of the Presidium of the Supreme Soviet of the RSFSR, the village of Ossora was classified as a workers' settlement.

== Geography ==
Ossora is located in the northeast of the Kamchatka Peninsula, on the eastern shore of Karaginsky Gulf in the Bering Sea. The settlement stretches for 3 kilometers along the shore of Ossora Bay. Lake Ossora is located to the west of the village.

== Climate ==
Ossora has a subarctic climate (Köppen: Dfc), The hottest month is July with a monthly mean of 13.4 °C or 56.1 °F, and the coldest month is January with a mean temperature of −15.0 °C or 5.0 °F. While there is a substantial maritime influence vis-à-vis inland areas of the Russian Far East and even vis-à-vis the Sea of Okhotsk coast, the climate is much colder than the western coasts of Europe and North America on similar latitudes, for instance being 6.9 °C (12.4 °F) colder than Juneau and 8.1 °C (14.6 °F) colder than Oslo.

Climate data for Ossora (Climate ID:32246)
Month	Jan	Feb	Mar	Apr	May	Jun	Jul	Aug	Sep	Oct	Nov	Dec	Year
Record high °C (°F)	2.8 (37.0)	2.5 (36.5)	2.7 (36.9)	10.0 (50.0)	18.6 (65.5)	28.3 (82.9)	29.2 (84.6)	26.3 (79.3)	24.0 (75.2)	14.4 (57.9)	7.3 (45.1)	3.5 (38.3)	29.2 (84.6)
Mean daily maximum °C (°F)	−10.4 (13.3)	−9.4 (15.1)	−5.7 (21.7)	−1.3 (29.7)	4.6 (40.3)	12.4 (54.3)	16.8 (62.2)	16.3 (61.3)	12.2 (54.0)	5.0 (41.0)	−2.2 (28.0)	−8.2 (17.2)	2.5 (36.5)
Daily mean °C (°F)	−14.7 (5.5)	−14.1 (6.6)	−10.3 (13.5)	−5.2 (22.6)	1.6 (34.9)	8.3 (46.9)	12.9 (55.2)	12.8 (55.0)	8.5 (47.3)	1.5 (34.7)	−5.9 (21.4)	−12.2 (10.0)	−1.4 (29.5)
Mean daily minimum °C (°F)	−19.5 (−3.1)	−19.2 (−2.6)	−15.4 (4.3)	−9.7 (14.5)	−1.4 (29.5)	4.6 (40.3)	9.6 (49.3)	9.5 (49.1)	4.7 (40.5)	−1.9 (28.6)	−9.9 (14.2)	−16.8 (1.8)	−5.4 (22.2)
Record low °C (°F)	−41.1 (−42.0)	−40.5 (−40.9)	−40.3 (−40.5)	−29.7 (−21.5)	−16.9 (1.6)	−4.4 (24.1)	2.0 (35.6)	−0.9 (30.4)	−6.1 (21.0)	−17.4 (0.7)	−32.2 (−26.0)	−39.4 (−38.9)	−41.1 (−42.0)
Average precipitation mm (inches)	47.9 (1.89)	40.5 (1.59)	58.3 (2.30)	36.6 (1.44)	45.1 (1.78)	43.3 (1.70)	48.7 (1.92)	86.9 (3.42)	75.1 (2.96)	76.8 (3.02)	66.3 (2.61)	46.8 (1.84)	672.3 (26.47)
Source: Roshydromet
