= Karaginsky =

Karaginsky (masculine), Karaginskaya (feminine), or Karaginskoye (neuter) may refer to:

- Karaginsky District, a district of Koryak Okrug of Kamchatka Krai, Russia
- Karaginsky Island, an island in the Bering Sea
