= Creation, Man and the Messiah =

Poem by Henrik Wergeland

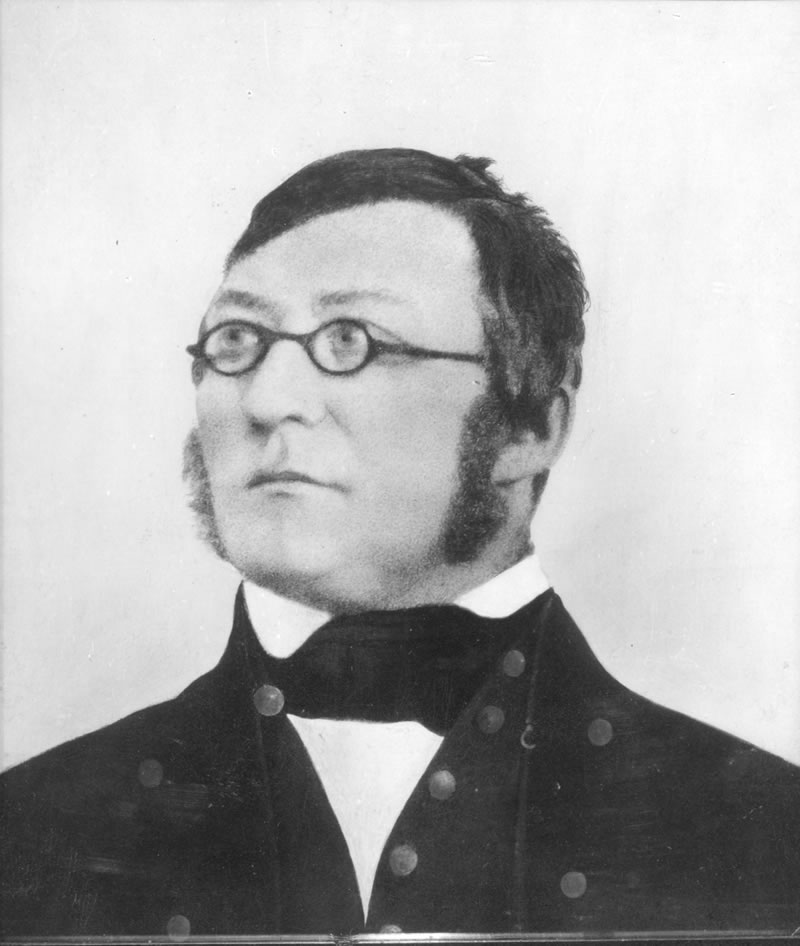
Henrik Wergeland, author of Skabelsen, mennesket og Messias - et digt

Creation, Man and the Messiah (Norwegian: Skabelsen, mennesket og Messias - et digt) is the title of an epic poem written by the Norwegian poet Henrik Wergeland in 1829. The scale of the poem invited criticism, especially by Wergeland's counterpart, Johan Sebastian Welhaven. In 1845, while on his deathbed, Wergeland revised the poem and republished it under the title Man (Norwegian: mennesket) .

== Creation ==
=== The two spirits ===
The poem starts out at the beginning of history, with two spirits watching and arguing over the newly created earth. One of them, Phun-Abiriel, is dismayed, because he is eager to create on his own, but unlike God, his thoughts do not take shape. In the process, he also wishes to see God, but can't. Phun-Abiriel's friend, Ohebiel, patiently explains to him that the spirits are not able to see the eternal, and that Phun-Abiriel is considered a newborn spirit or a rash youth. Anyway, Ohebiel loves him, but can't help him from brooding. As they talk, the heavenly host approaches, led by the eldest of spirits, Akadiel.

=== Life on earth ===
Then, Akadiel and the host witness the birth of life, as recalled in Genesis, over a period of six days. At the end of this part, Akadiel holds his speech to the still-sleeping human couple, demanding of them that they shall be rulers over themselves first, and then over the creation as such, and honour God in the creation and in themselves.

=== The soul-giving ===
Phun-Abiriel (his names formed of the names Phuniel and Abiriel, telling of the two sides of his character), still broods over the sleeping humans below him. He makes up his mind that he would rather rule the earth as a man than be the most lowly of heavenly spirits. He decides he will become the soul of the sleeping man, and the little "geist" that were in man before him, shall become "dream", as he himself will be called "thought". Phun-Abiriel then descends and merges with the sleeping Adam, and as this happens, he ultimately forgets his spiritual self and his background. Ohebiel, watching this, despairs, and wonders what will happen if the woman awakes without soul, and what kind of monster would come from the union of the two. To hinder this, she merges with Eve, after the advice of Akadiel, and she sacrifices herself on behalf of humanity with the words: "Man, hope!" The history of humanity, at this point, can proceed as planned.

== The bewildering ==
This second part is the longest section of the epic poem. It follows the life of Adam and Eve, and their recognition as kindred spirits; this section also details Adam's fall in pride and Wergeland's version of the fall of man, here solely on the male account. Then, there are parts of Biblical history detailed, such as Cain and Abel, the great flood, and so on.

=== Origin of lordships ===
This part consists of two monologues, one considering secular power, and one considering clerical power, over people's goods and thoughts.

=== Glimpses of light: the Golden Age ===
This part tells of the archetypical man, who is both a king and a sage, along with a culture-hero, who teaches people to build cities, till the earth, govern justly and look into themselves for the truth. The woman teaches people agriculture, and is hailed as Isis, Ceres, Frigga and Athena. The man is hailed as Osiris, Crishna, Fu Hsi in China, Baal, Odin, Tuisto, Dionysus, Herakles, Zeus and Saturn.

As Man works to enlighten humanity, he is also acknowledged as Kneph, Akhar, Zerouane-Akherene, Huang Di, Fta (Siamese ephitet to deities), Nyame, Kutka, Sommonadokom, Allfađir and eventually Eloah. In the process, the vedam, the Zen, the I Ching, and the Ten Commandments are established as laws and guidelines. The last names to be given of this amalgam of earthly wisdom are: Hermes, Mimir, Zerdust, Yu the Great, Yao (ruler), Buddha, Manu (Hinduism), Confucius and Moses.

In the end, Akadiel approaches and foretells how this golden age of wisdom and prosperity eventually will corrupt itself to the Iron Age, with chained thralls and manipulation. He then tells that humanity, the "abiriels", eventually will rise and cast off their chains, to make a new priesthood in freedom and brotherly love.

=== Ruling classes ===
This part is a return to the theme of the lords and the priests, telling of exploitation and greed on behalf of the few. The voices from the people answer the demands of the lordships.

=== Interlude of hearts ===
This part contains scenes of romance, telling how individuals in love with one another can disregard their own potential differences between casts and classes.

=== Power and deceit ===
This section tells how the rulers and priests continue their treatment of ordinary people by means of practices such as human sacrifice and dictatorship. This part contains 28 different scenes.

=== Breakthrough for the human spirit ===
Philosophers, mostly Greeks, are introduced into the epic poem here; among them are Epicurus, Democritus, Aristotle and Plato. Plato is hailed by Akadiel as the one who perceives most clearly God's overall plan for humanity and the coming of Christ. Also, some of the Jewish sects are introduced, such as the Pharisees and the Sadducees. In the end, the prophet Mika foretells the coming of Christ.

=== Heaven and Hell ===
This part tells how Wergeland envisioned the difference between the blessed and the unblessed. Characters from the "power and deceit" section are introduced again; as the tortured ones rejoice, the former rulers recognize themselves as condemned, although they are all in the same place. In Wergeland's spirit-world, hell is a personal state of circumstances.

== Salvation ==
This third main part concentrates mostly on Jesus and the story afterwards. Jesus is introduced mourning the history of the human race and their toils; he is comforted by Akadiel. Under Akadiel's guidance, Jesus walks out to his task, in a sequence based closely on the gospels. During this section, Jesus delivers a speech, based loosely on the Sermon on the Mount, where he tells the human spirit to acknowledge itself as what it is, through love.

This last section of the poem was written for the revised version of 1845.

=== First great victory of Christianity ===
The ironic title of this section refers to the Roman Empire`s transition to Christianity in the fourth century. Wergeland states that the Roman emperor is getting troubled by this sudden onset of peaceful ideology and the denial of power. The emperor then decides to get baptized, because he will then have sway over his people once more. The peaceful approach of Christianity, says Wergeland, is toppled and abused by the powers that be.

=== Spiritual resurrection of Christ ===
Here, the poet himself appears, sitting on a hilltop easter morning and contemplating the turn of events the last 1845 years from the coming of Christ to the then-present day. Akadiel addresses Wergeland, and the poet is allowed a glimpse one thousand years into the future as a means of seeing the conditions the world and humanity are in at that time. He awakens every century to see for himself what has happened and witnesses spiritual and political progress and liberation. The conditions he sees include the end of slavery; the liberation of women; and all Christian fractions merging into one, thus making the papacy obsolete, as the last pope dies 600 years from 1845. Eventually, all humanity becomes "Christian, each according to the colour of his own character". The poem ends in a praise to God, and the poet awakes, reconciled.

== Differences between the 1829 and 1845 versions ==
Akadiel of the 1845 rendition of this poem was named Messiah in 1829. This made a distinction between Jesus and Messiah, which was not tolerated by the church at the time. The early version was also more dualistic in approach than the later version.

== Primary Source ==
- Wergeland, Henrik Skabelsen, mennesket og Messias (Svein Sandnes Bokforlag. 2008) ISBN 9788292945001

== Other sources ==
- Flom, George T. Scandinavian Studies and Notes (Society for the Advancement of Scandinavian Study, Volume 5, page 174. 1920)
- Grøndahl, Illit Henrik Wergeland, the Norwegian poet (BiblioBazaar, 2009) ISBN 978-1115014830
