= Esso (disambiguation) =

Esso is a trading name for the oil and gas company ExxonMobil.

Esso or ESSO may also refer to:

- Esso (village), a village in Kamchatka Krai, Russia
- Eric Esso (born 1994), Ghanaian footballer
- Joseph Esso, (born 1996), Ghanaian footballer
- Laurent Esso (born 1942), Cameroonian politician
- Solitoki Esso (fl. from 1979), Togolese politician
