= Milkovo, Kamchatka Krai =

Rural locality in Milkovsky District, Kamchatka Krai, Russia

Milkovo Мильково
- Selo
- Aerial view of Milkovo

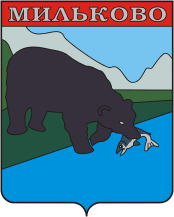
- Coat of arms
- Interactive map of Milkovo
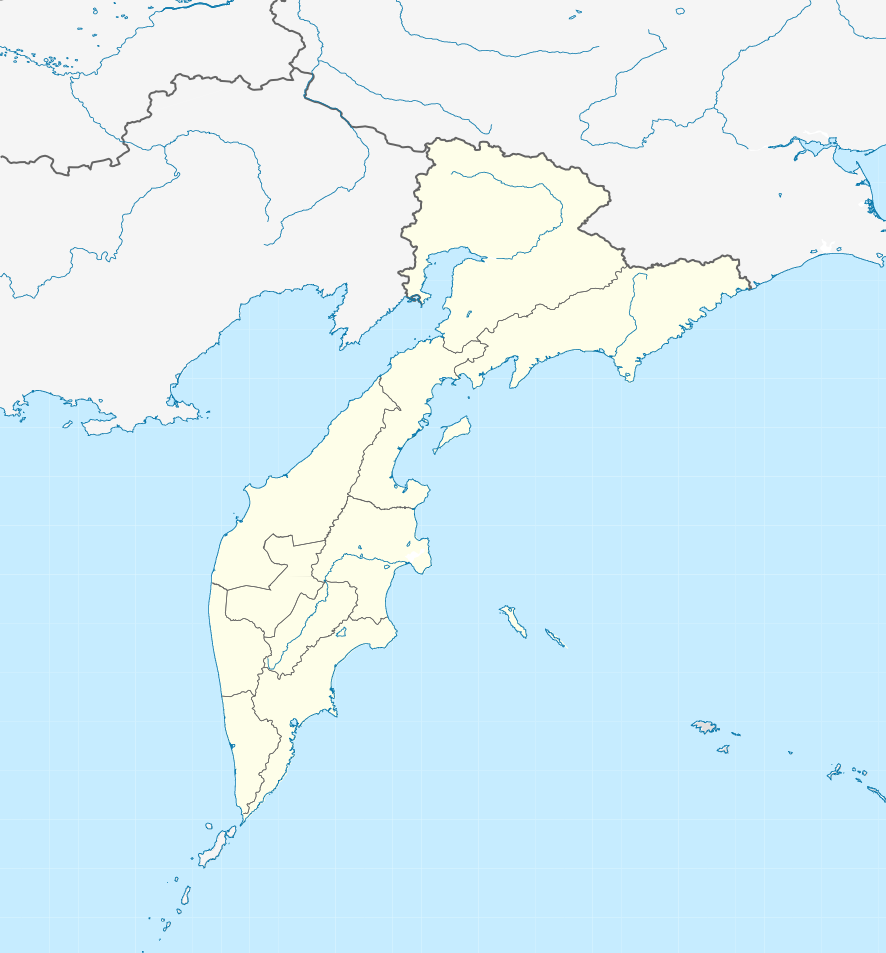
- Location of Milkovo Milkovo (Kamchatka Krai)
- Coordinates: 54°41′43″N 158°37′18″E
- Country: Russia
- Federal subject: Kamchatka Krai
- Administrative district: Milkovsky District
- Founded: 1743

Population (2010 Census)
  - Total: 8,251
  - Estimate (2021): 7,352 (−10.9%)
- Time zone: UTC+12 (MSK+9)
- Postal code: 684300
- OKTMO ID: 30610401101

Milkovo (Russian: Мильково) is a rural locality (a selo) and the administrative center of Milkovsky District, Kamchatka Krai, Russia. Population: 7,352 (2021 census); 8,251 (2010 census); 9,243 (2002 census); 12,132 (1989 Soviet census).

The settlement contains a gas station and a restaurant known as the "Beer House". Milkovo also houses the Milkovo Museum of Local Lore, which was founded as a volunteer effort in 1976, the effort being led by the artist Mikhail Iosifovich Ugrin. The museum contains artifacts from the indigenous peoples of Kamchatka such as the Itelmens, Koryaks, Evens, Aleuts, a memorial cabinet to the Italmen and Soviet poet, writer, and folklorist Georgy Germanovich Porotovas, and objects from the nature of the area such as ancient animal fossils, a bison skull, tusks and mammoth teeth, stuffed birds, and minerals.

Milkovo also contains the Ostrozhnaya Wall park-museum, which was established in the 1980s and hosts annual fairs and various holiday events, including a rock festival that has been held every year since 2012. The park features a monument honoring Kamchatka's pioneers and indigenous people, along with statues of the Itelmen god Khantai, depicted as a half-man, half-fish figure. Khantai, revered as the patron of anglers, is positioned facing the river, where offerings are traditionally made to him.

== History ==
Milkovo was first mentioned in 1743. In this year, five families constructed homes along the Imcherek River near the old Verkhne-Kamchatsky burg. The river was renamed Milkovushka, and the settlement became known as Milkovo. Indigenous Itelmens lived nearby and soon began to exchange goods and knowledge with the new settlers. Observing the benefits of living in wooden houses, the Itelmens adopted a settled lifestyle and engaged in agriculture.

Before the arrival of Russians, the indigenous population did not use iron tools or smelt ore. In the mid-18th century, Semyon Glazachev, a merchant from Irkutsk, discovered iron ore in the area and started smelting it, leading to the establishment of a short-lived ironworks in Milkovo. Although the local iron quality was inferior to imported iron, the plant met some local needs before closing after about 20 years.

In 1780, potatoes were introduced to Milkovo, significantly impacting local agriculture. Initially met with apprehension, potatoes were soon appreciated and cultivated. However, attempts to grow wheat and rye were unsuccessful due to the harsh climate, which caused cereals to freeze. Consequently, Milkovo's residents primarily relied on hunting and fishing for sustenance.

Throughout the 19th century, Milkovo continued to develop. Travelers and sailors frequently visited, and in 1818, the crew of the sailing ship "Nadezhda" funded the construction of a hospital. The first parish school opened in 1870. With the advent of Soviet power, Milkovo saw more intensive development. In the 1930s, the village became a training base for sled dogs, an airport was built, and air transportation with Petropavlovsk-Kamchatsky was established. The village expanded with two main streets and houses stretching for two kilometers.

During World War II, Milkovo's residents faced hardships but contributed to the war effort by donating their savings for military equipment. A memorial honors the 68 residents who served. Post-war development surged in the 1960s with the construction of a highway to Petropavlovsk-Kamchatsky, renewed in recent years. Television was introduced in 1975, alongside the construction of multi-story buildings. Milkovo was first mentioned in 1743. An ironworks was founded in Milkovo in 1752, but closed after 20 years. A road connecting Milkovo with Petropavlovsk-Kamchatsky was opened in 1966.

== Rural Olympics ==
From 1972 to 1992, Kamchatka Peninsula hosted biannual Rural Olympics featuring summer and winter sports. These games originally began in Milkovo, and after a two-decade hiatus following the Soviet Union's dissolution, local authorities and past participants revived the tradition in 2013. Milkovo's stadium was renovated for the event, which saw 200 athletes from across Kamchatka competing in various sports, including football, volleyball, street basketball, table tennis, track and field, strength competitions, sambo wrestling, and weightlifting.
