= Flag of Kamchatka Oblast =

2002–2007 flag of the Russian federal subject

Flag of Kamchatka Oblast

The flag of Kamchatka Oblast, in the Russian Federation, was a horizontal bicolour of white and blue charged with an emblem displaying three volcanic mountains on the upper left hoist. The emblem was a modification of the arms of Kamchatka with a white background. The arms, in contrast, display a blue background.

The flag was adopted in February, 2002. The proportions are 2:3. In 2007, Kamchatka Oblast ceased to exist and was merged with Koryak Autonomous Okrug to become a new federal unit called Kamchatka Krai. Thus, the flag was replaced by the Flag of Kamchatka Krai, which is visually similar.
