= Beringia (sled dog race) =

Annual sled dog race

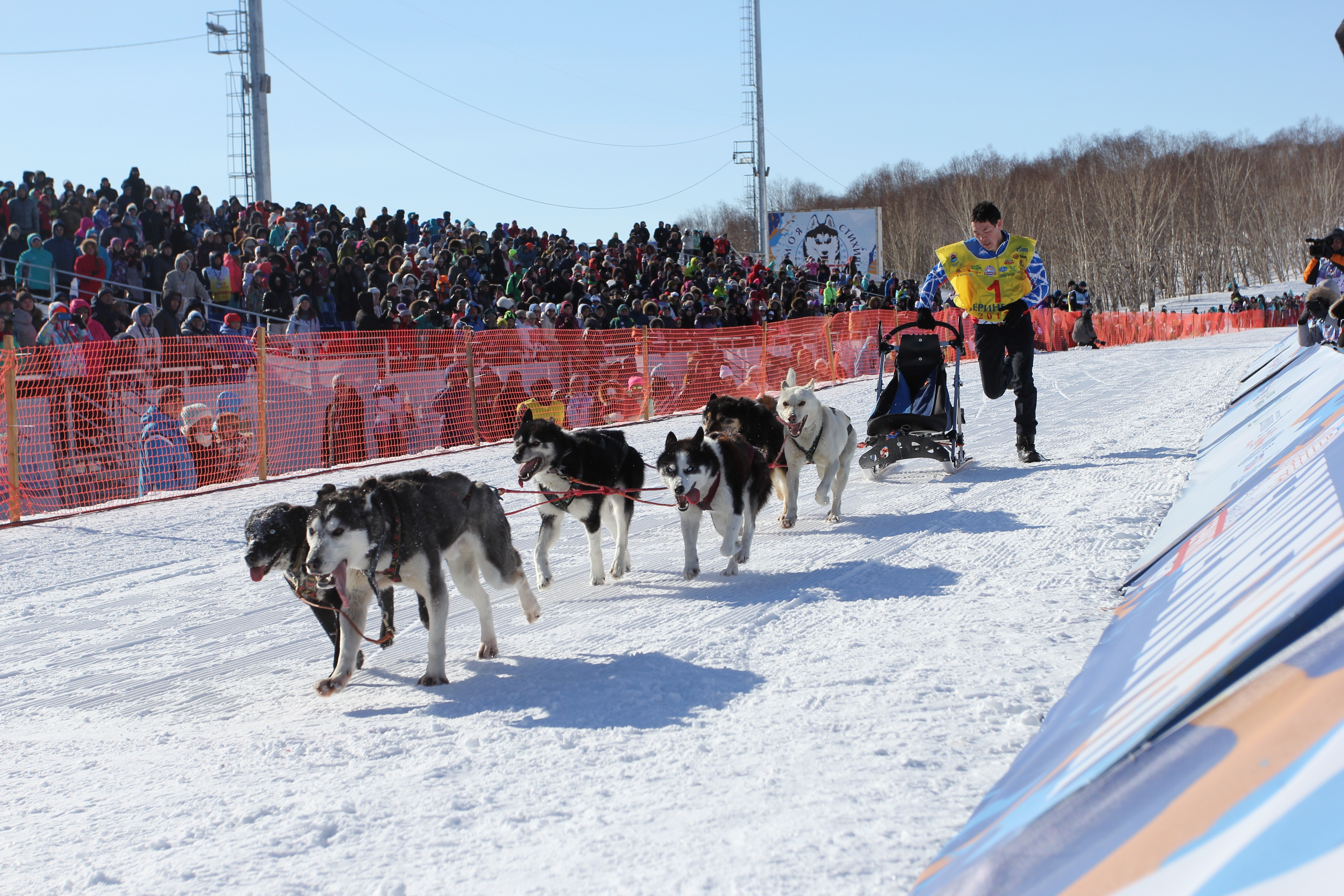

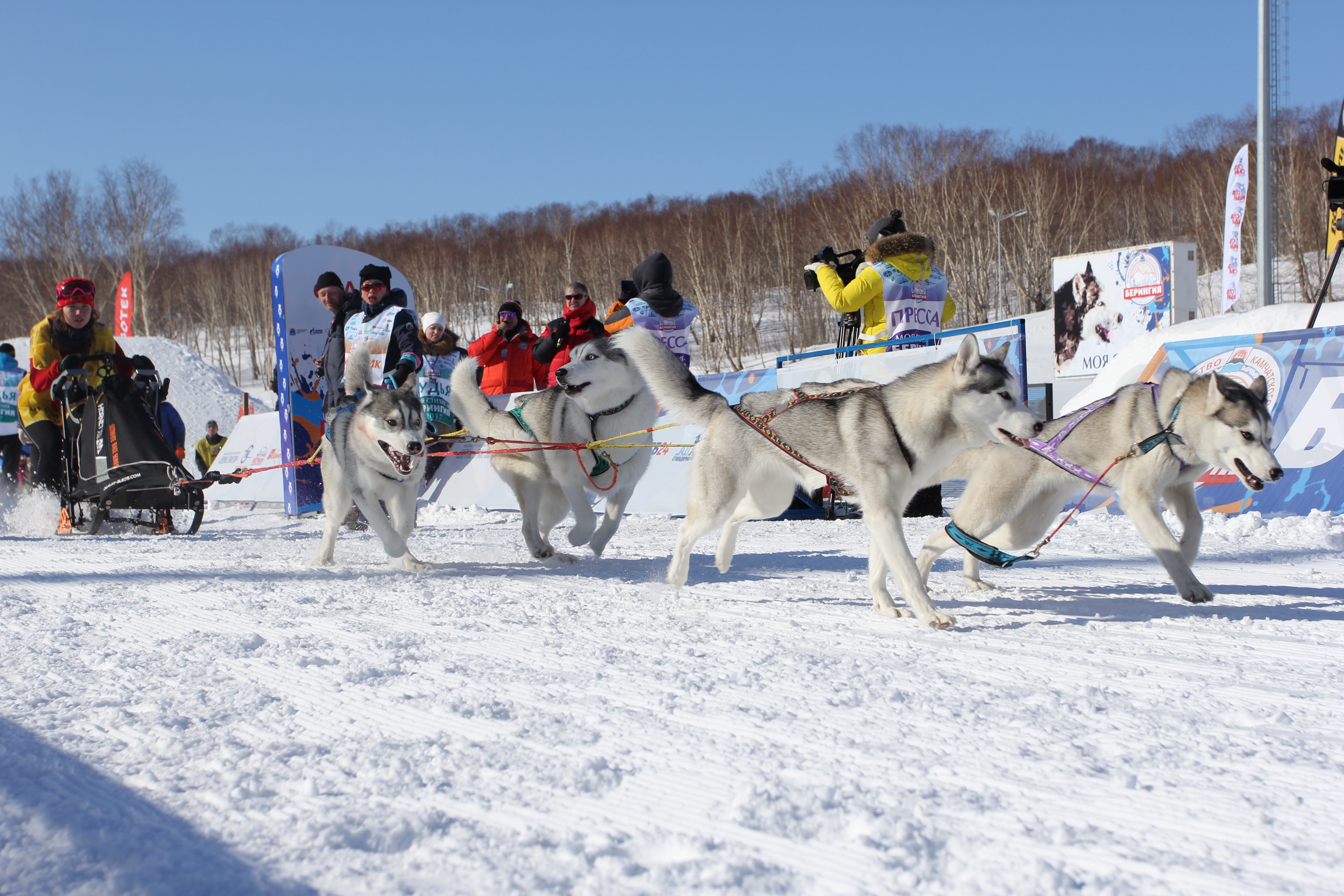

Beringia (Russian: Берингия) is a sled dog race of variable length held in Kamchatka Krai and Chukotka Autonomous Okrug, Russia. First held in 1990, Beringia in 1992 currently holds the Guinness world record for longest dog sled race. Today, Beringia is an official holiday in Kamchatka.

== History ==
Originally started in April 1990 to preserve local sled dog traditions including the Kamchatka sled dog, the first race saw 8 teams compete over a 260 kilometres (160 mi) route. The following year, the route was lengthened to 1,980 kilometres (1,230 mi). In 1992, the route was lengthened even further, setting a world record for longest dog sled race with teams racing 2,044 kilometres (1,270 mi) from Esso, Kamchatka to Markova, Chukotka.

== Course ==
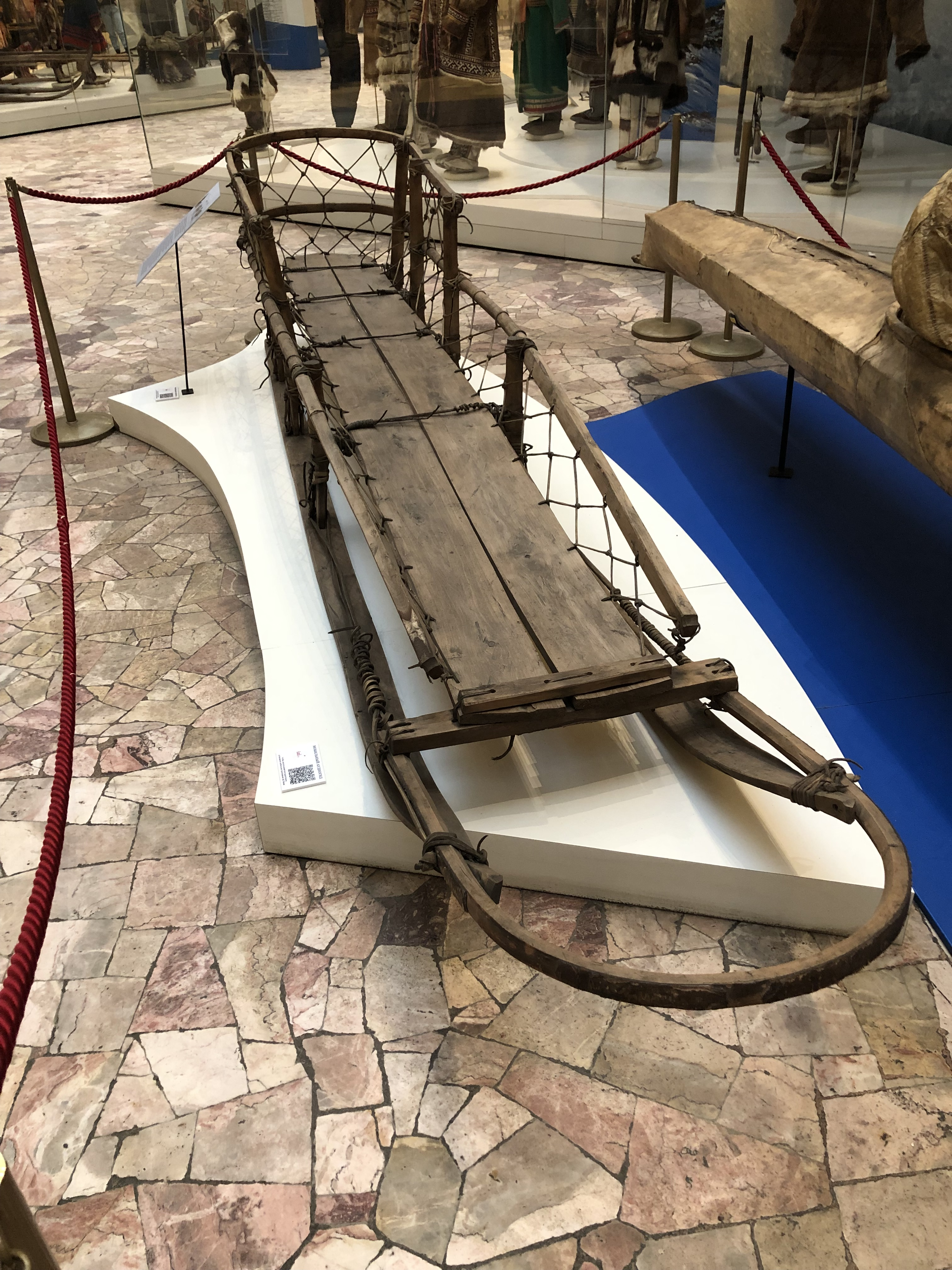
Narta

Beringia teams face many challenges, including navigating through the mountainous terrain of Kamchatka and Chukotka as well as harsh weather conditions with temperatures as low as −40 °C (−40 °F). The Beringia route and mileage have been altered multiple times, but it has consistently passed through the villages of the Kamchatka peninsula, where many towns along the route host festivities in conjunction with the race. In 2010, Beringia became an official holiday in Kamchatka. In remote parts of Kamchatka, dogsledding remains a key part of the economy and the race serves a vital secondary purpose in the region, by delivering food, sports equipment, school supplies, and books to otherwise inaccessible areas.

While most racers use modern sleds, a few mushers choose a traditional Siberian wooden sled called a "narta". Kamchatka-style nartas are narrow, low-slung sleds where the musher sits, designed for quick passage through forests. Prizes are awarded to mushers who complete Beringia using a narta for "honoring the traditions of the North."

== See also ==
- Sled dog
- Mushing
- Sled dog racing
- List of sled dog races
