= Administrative divisions of Kamchatka Krai =

Kamchatka Krai Russia
- Administrative centre: Petropavlovsk-Kamchatsky

Administrative structure (as of 2014)
- Districts: 11
- Cities/towns: 3
- Urban-type settlements: 2
- Selsovets: 0

Municipal structure (as of 2002)
- Rural settlements: 83 (inhabited); 10 (uninhabited)

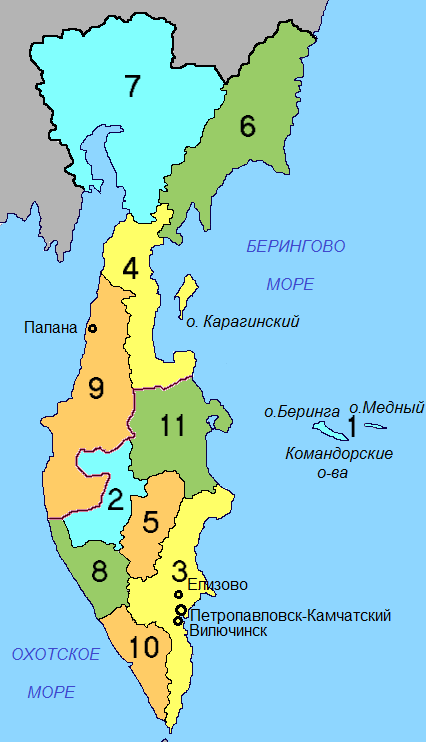
Map of Kamchatka Krai

Kamchatka Krai was formed on July 1, 2007 as a result of the merger of Kamchatka Oblast with Koryak Autonomous Okrug.

== Administrative and municipal divisions ==
Map

- ✪ - part of Koryak Okrug (Корякский о́круг)

| Number on map | Division | | Structure | | OKATO | OKTMO | Urban-type settlement |
| Number on map | Division | | Administrative | Municipal | OKATO | OKTMO | Urban-type settlement |
|---|---|---|---|---|---|---|---|
| - | Vilyuchinsk (Вилючинск) | | city (ZATO) | urban okrug | 30 535 | 30 735 | |
| - | Petropavlovsk-Kamchatsky (Петропавловск-Камчатский) | | city | urban okrug | 30 401 | 30 701 | |
| - | Yelizovo (Елизово) | | city | (under Yelizovsky) | 30 402 | 30 607 | |
| 1 | Aleutsky (Алеутский) | | district | | 30 201 | 30 601 | |
| 2 | Bystrinsky (Быстринский) | | district | | 30 204 | 30 604 | |
| 3 | Yelizovsky (Елизовский) | | district | | 30 207 | 30 607 | Vulkanny (Вулканный) |
| 5 | Milkovsky (Мильковский) | | district | | 30 210 | 30 610 | |
| 8 | Sobolevsky (Соболевский) | | district | | 30 213 | 30 613 | |
| 10 | Ust-Bolsheretsky (Усть-Большерецкий) | | district | | 30 216 | 30 616 | |
| 11 | Ust-Kamchatsky (Усть-Камчатский) | | district | | 30 219 | 30 619 | |
| 4 | ✪ | Karaginsky (Карагинский) | special district | district | 30 124 | 30 824 | |
| 6 | ✪ | Olyutorsky (Олюторский) | special district | district | 30 127 | 30 827 | |
| 7 | ✪ | Penzhinsky (Пенжинский) | special district | district | 30 129 | 30 829 | |
| 9 | ✪ | Tigilsky (Тигильский) | special district | district | 30 132 | 30 832 | |
| - | ✪ | Palana (Палана) | (under Tigilsky) | urban okrug | 30 132 | 30 851 | |

== See also ==
- Administrative divisions of Kamchatka Oblast
- Administrative divisions of Koryak Autonomous Okrug
