= Machevna Bay =

Bay of the Bering Sea, Russia

Coordinates: 60°50′N 171°40′E

Machevna Bay (Russian: бухта Мачевна, romanized: bukhta Machevna) is a bay in Koryak Okrug of Kamchatka Krai, Russia, located approximately 350 kilometers (220 mi) (by air) north of Tilichiki. Machevna River flows into this bay.
