= Milkovsky District =

Milkovsky District Мильковский район (Russian)
- District
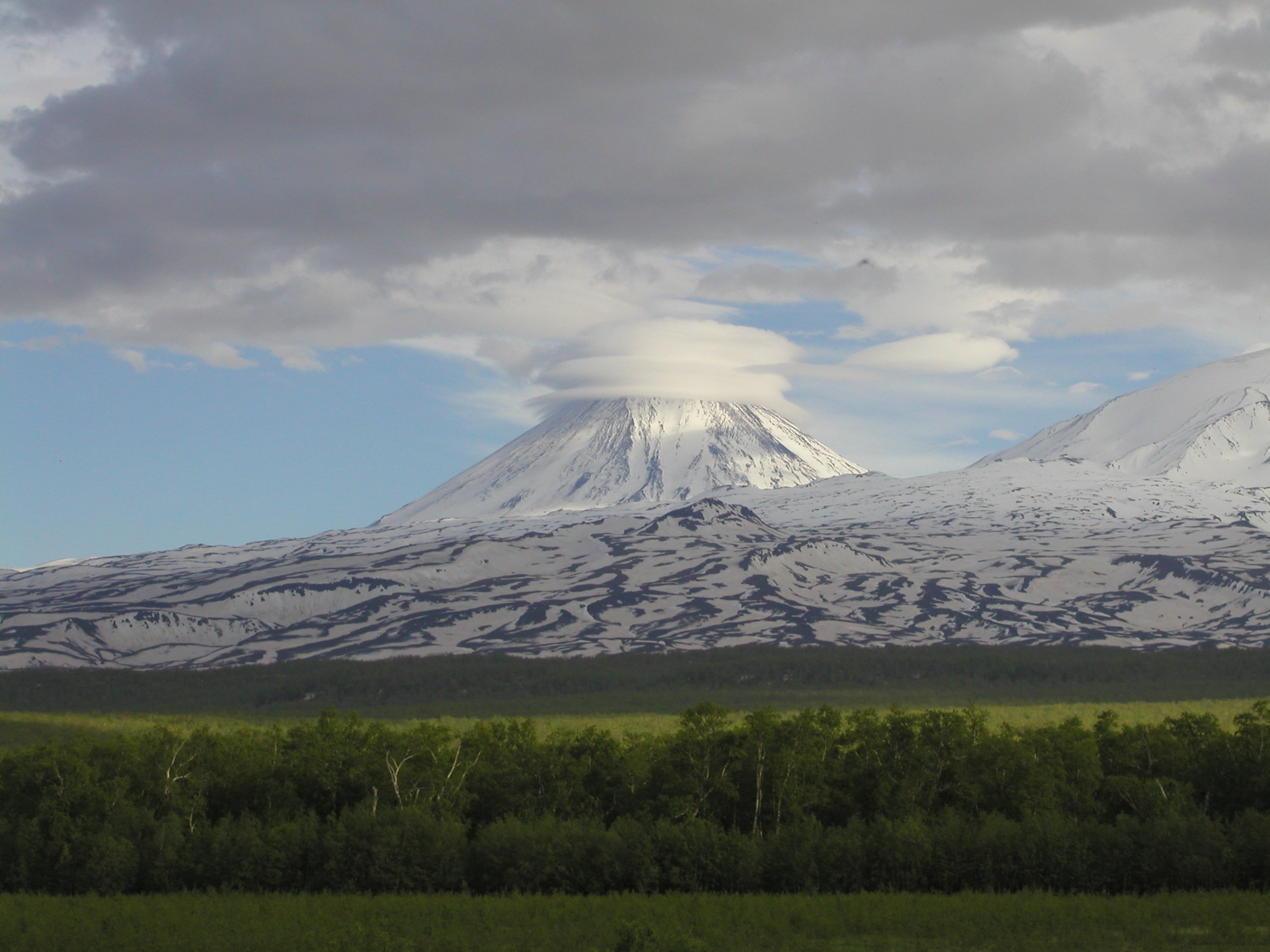
- Klyuchevskoy Volcano, Milkovsky District

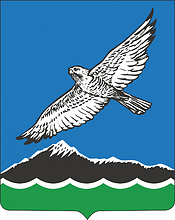
- Coat of arms
- Location of Milkovsky District in Kamchatka Krai
- Coordinates: 54°41′47″N 158°37′15″E
- Country: Russia
- Federal subject: Kamchatka Krai
- Administrative center: Milkovo

Area
  - Total: 22,590 km^{2} (8,720 sq mi)

Population (2010 Census)
  - Total: 10,585
  - Density: 0.4686/km^{2} (1.214/sq mi)
  - Urban: 0%
  - Rural: 100%

Administrative structure
  - Inhabited localities: 8 rural localities

Municipal structure
  - Municipally incorporated as: Milkovsky Municipal District
  - Municipal divisions: 0 urban settlements, 2 rural settlements
- Time zone: UTC+12 (MSK+9)
- OKTMO ID: 30610000
- Website: http://www.milkovoadm.ru/

Milkovsky District (Russian: Ми́льковский райо́н) is an administrative and municipal district (raion) of Kamchatka Krai, Russia, one of the eleven in the krai. It is located in the southern central part of the krai. The area of the district is 22,590 square kilometers (8,720 sq mi). Its administrative center is the rural locality (a selo) of Milkovo. Population: 10,585 (2010 census); 12,080 (2002 census); 16,913 (1989 Soviet census). The population of Milkovo accounts for 78.0% of the district's total population.

Ethnic composition (2010):

- Russians – 75.5%
- Kamchadals – 10.2%
- Itelmens – 5.8%
- Ukrainians – 4.0%
- Others – 4.4%
