= Koekchuch =

Extinct gender identity in the Itelmen culture

Koekchuch is an extinct gender identity recorded among the Itelmens of Siberia. These were male assigned at birth individuals who behaved as women did, and were recorded in the late 18th century and early 19th century.

The Russian researcher of Siberia and Kamchatka Stepan Krasheninnikov, in his "Description of the Land of Kamchatka" (Описании земли Камчатки), describes koekchuch as "people of the transformed sex" (людей превращённого пола) - a special category of men who "go in women's dresses, do all the women's work and don't socialize with men" (в женском платье ходят, всю женскую работу отправляют, и с мужчинами не имеют никакого обхождения). According to Krasheninnikov's description, the koekchuch also served as concubines. Krasheninnikov notes similar phenomena not only among the Itelmens but also among the Koryaks; however, the latter kept koekchuch, unlike Itelmens, "not in honor, but in contempt".
