= Flag of Koryak Okrug =

Flag of the Russian okrug of Koryak

Flag of Koryak Okrug

The flag of Koryak Okrug is a vertical triband of teal and white charged in the center by a red reindeer head. Its proportions are 2:3.

The flag was approved on 13 July 1998, and entered into the State Heraldic Register of the Russian Federation with the assignment of registration number 438.

Despite the unification of the regions in 2007, the flag continued to be used until 2010, when the flag of Kamchatka Krai was approved.
