= Chachy =

Female deity of the Itelmens of Kamchatka

Chachy is a female deity of the Itelmens of Kamchatka. She has outstanding intellectual insight. She is the wife of Kutka, and is smarter than him.

When the world was young, the divine couple met year after year at the many great rivers, and begat a son and a daughter at each of these, from whom the Itelmen trace their genealogical origin. As each river then started with this unique first pair of parents, so the many dialects are thus explained.
