= Danila Antsiferov =

Russian explorer

Danila Yakovlevich Antsiferov (Russian: Данила Яковлевич Анциферов; died 1712) was a Russian explorer.

Upon the death of Vladimir Atlasov in 1711, Danila Antsiferov was elected Cossack ataman of the Kamchatka. Together with Ivan Kozyrevsky, he was one of the first Russian Cossacks to visit the Shumshu and Paramushir Islands of the Kuril Islands. Danila Antsiferov and his companions were the first ones to describe these islands in writing. He was killed by the Itelmens in 1712.

== Sources ==
- "Анцыфоров, Данило" . Brockhaus and Efron Encyclopedic Dictionary (in Russian). 1906.
- Анцыферов, Данила Яковлевич in the Great Soviet Encyclopedia (in Russian) – via Great Scientific Library
