= Kamchatka (river) =

River in Kamchatka, Russia

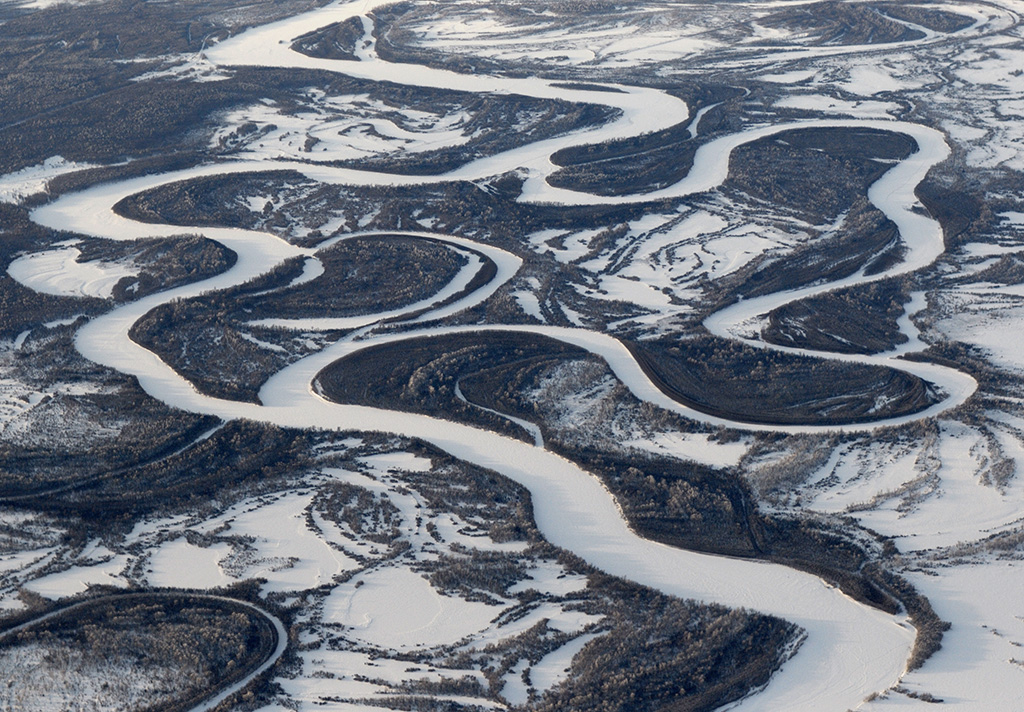
- Meanders

- Location of mouth

Location
- Country: Russia

Physical characteristics
- Mouth: Pacific Ocean
  - location: Ust-Kamchatsk
  - coordinates: 56.2032°N 162.4844°E
- Length: 758 km (471 mi)
- Basin size: 55,900 km^{2} (21,600 sq mi)

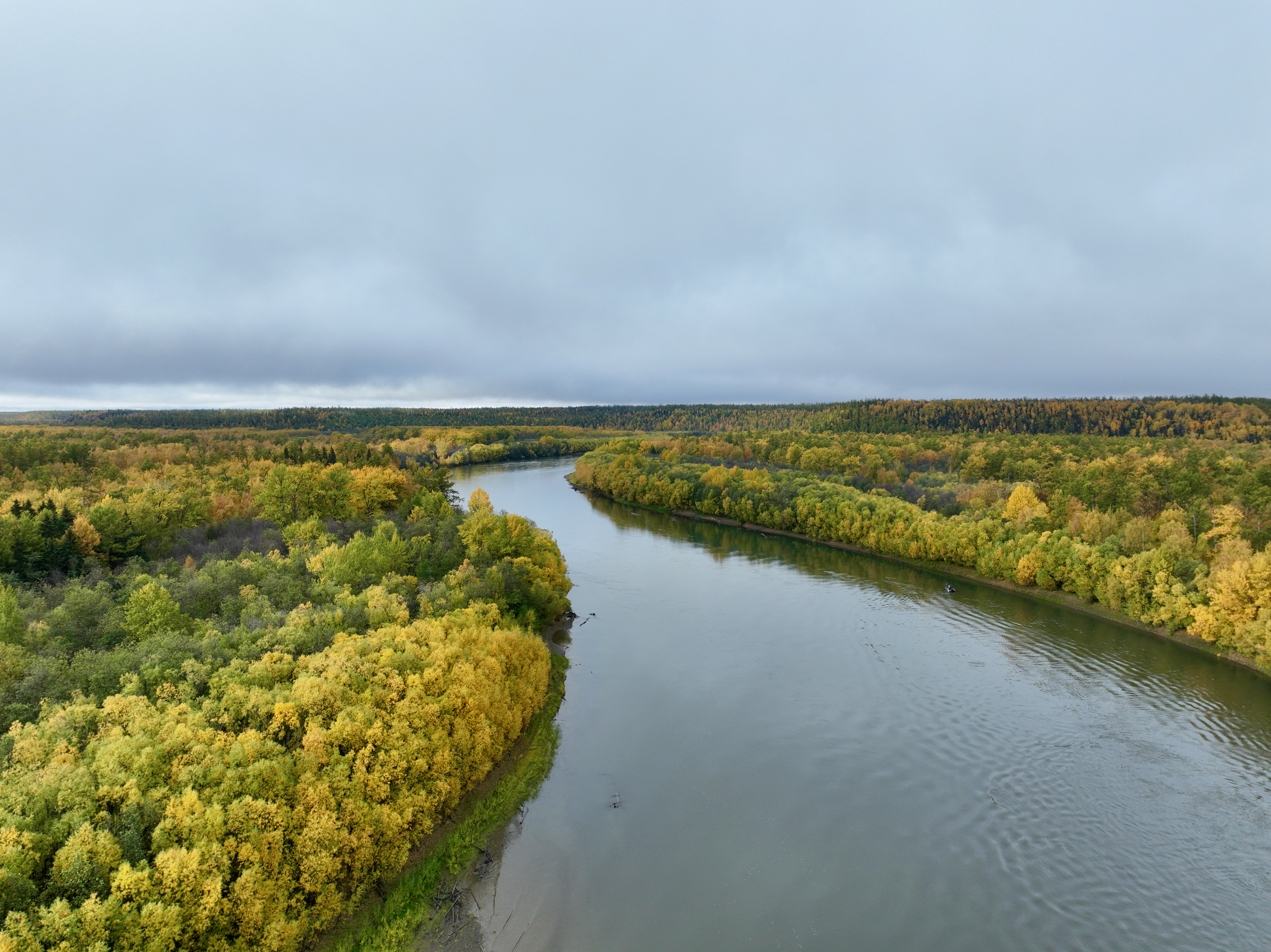
Kamchatka River

The Kamchatka (Russian: Камча́тка) is the longest river in Kamchatka peninsula, located in Kamchatka Krai in the Russian Far East. It flows into the Pacific Ocean at the town Ust-Kamchatsk, on the east coast of Kamchatka. It is 758 kilometres (471 mi) long, and has a drainage basin of 55,900 square kilometres (21,600 sq mi). The river is rich with salmon, millions of which spawn yearly and which once supported the settlements of the native Itelmen.

== Climate ==
Like most of its namesake peninsula, the basin of the Kamchatka River has at low altitudes a subarctic climate (Köppen Dfc) with short, cool-to-comfortable summers and freezing, snowy winters.

Climate data for Icha (Climate ID:32411)
Month	Jan	Feb	Mar	Apr	May	Jun	Jul	Aug	Sep	Oct	Nov	Dec	Year
Record high °C (°F)	7.2 (45.0)	6.6 (43.9)	8.4 (47.1)	13.8 (56.8)	19.8 (67.6)	25.6 (78.1)	30.1 (86.2)	27.8 (82.0)	25.4 (77.7)	19.4 (66.9)	13.0 (55.4)	8.8 (47.8)	30.1 (86.2)
Mean maximum °C (°F)	0.2 (32.4)	0.5 (32.9)	4.3 (39.7)	7.0 (44.6)	11.8 (53.2)	16.3 (61.3)	21.0 (69.8)	20.6 (69.1)	17.3 (63.1)	11.1 (52.0)	6.1 (43.0)	1.9 (35.4)	22.5 (72.5)
Mean daily maximum °C (°F)	−8.5 (16.7)	−7.6 (18.3)	−3.4 (25.9)	0.5 (32.9)	5.7 (42.3)	10.1 (50.2)	14.1 (57.4)	15.2 (59.4)	12.5 (54.5)	6.2 (43.2)	−0.2 (31.6)	−5.5 (22.1)	3.3 (37.9)
Daily mean °C (°F)	−11.8 (10.8)	−11.0 (12.2)	−6.9 (19.6)	−2.5 (27.5)	2.8 (37.0)	7.3 (45.1)	11.5 (52.7)	12.7 (54.9)	9.8 (49.6)	3.6 (38.5)	−2.7 (27.1)	−8.6 (16.5)	0.3 (32.6)
Mean daily minimum °C (°F)	−15.1 (4.8)	−14.6 (5.7)	−10.3 (13.5)	−5.3 (22.5)	0.5 (32.9)	5.4 (41.7)	9.4 (48.9)	10.8 (51.4)	7.3 (45.1)	1.2 (34.2)	−5.4 (22.3)	−11.8 (10.8)	−2.3 (27.8)
Mean minimum °C (°F)	−26.3 (−15.3)	−25.4 (−13.7)	−20.6 (−5.1)	−13.6 (7.5)	−4.3 (24.3)	1.2 (34.2)	5.9 (42.6)	5.9 (42.6)	1.3 (34.3)	−5.6 (21.9)	−15.4 (4.3)	−22.5 (−8.5)	−27.9 (−18.2)
Record low °C (°F)	−36.1 (−33.0)	−35.1 (−31.2)	−31 (−24)	−26.7 (−16.1)	−10.7 (12.7)	−2.3 (27.9)	1.1 (34.0)	−0.8 (30.6)	−3.9 (25.0)	−12.6 (9.3)	−23.9 (−11.0)	−30 (−22)	−36.1 (−33.0)
Average precipitation mm (inches)	25 (1.0)	20 (0.8)	20 (0.8)	27 (1.1)	34 (1.3)	41 (1.6)	66 (2.6)	102 (4.0)	74 (2.9)	87 (3.4)	77 (3.0)	41 (1.6)	614 (24.1)
Source: Roshydromet
