= Ust-Kamchatsk =

Settlement in Ust-Kamchatsky District, Kamchatka Krai, Russia

Ust-Kamchatsk Усть-Камчатск
- Rural locality
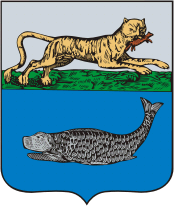
- Coat of arms
- Interactive map of Ust-Kamchatsk
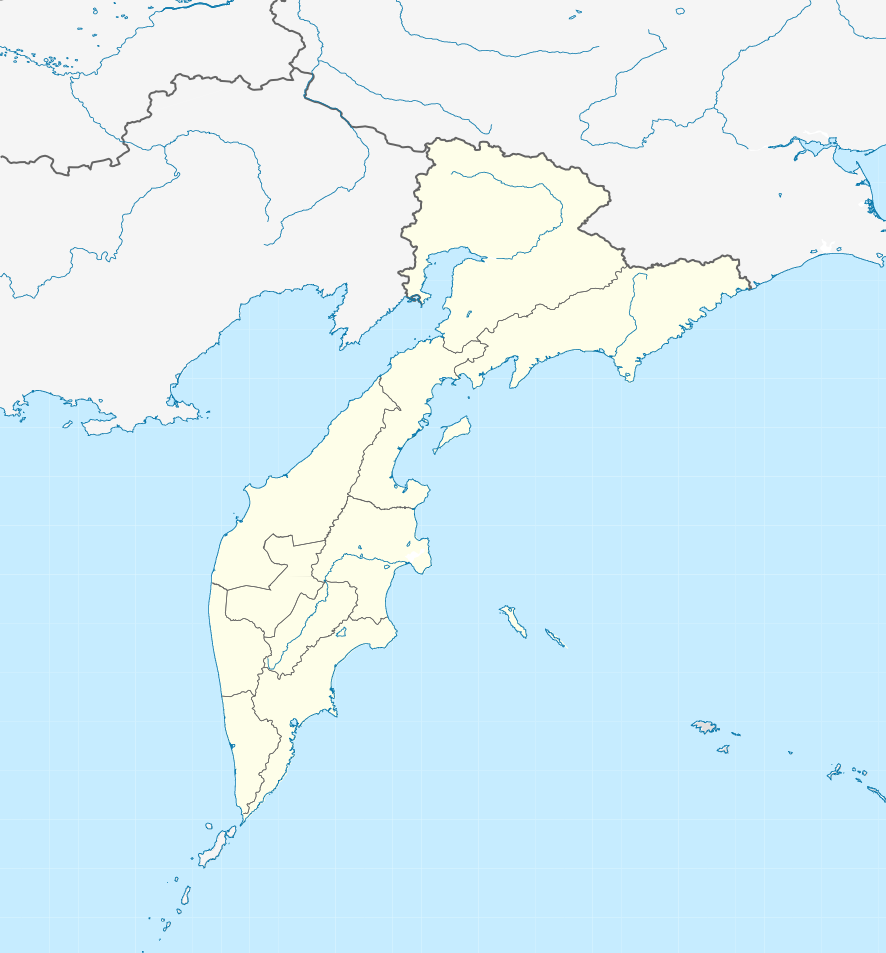
- Location of Ust-Kamchatsk Ust-Kamchatsk (Kamchatka Krai)
- Coordinates: 56°14′00″N 162°32′00″E
- Country: Russia
- Federal subject: Kamchatka Krai
- Administrative district: Ust-Kamchatsky District
- Founded: 1731

Population (2010 Census)
  - Total: 4,352
  - Estimate (2021): 3,548 (−18.5%)

Municipal status
  - Capital of: Ust-Kamchatsky District
- Time zone: UTC+12 (MSK+9)
- Postal code: 684412-684415
- Dialing code: +7 41534
- OKTMO ID: 30619401101

Ust-Kamchatsk (Russian: Усть-Камча́тск) is a rural locality (a settlement) and the administrative center of Ust-Kamchatsky District of Kamchatka Krai, Russia, located on the eastern shore of the Kamchatka Peninsula at the mouth of the Kamchatka River some 50 kilometers (31 mi) away from the Klyuchevskaya Sopka volcano and 522 kilometers (324 mi) from Petropavlovsk-Kamchatsky. Population: 4,352 (2010 census); 5,231 (2002 census); 13,611 (1989 Soviet census).

== History ==
It was founded in 1731 as the settlement of Ust-Primorsky (Усть-Примо́рский) and was renamed Ust-Kamchatsk in 1890. In 2007, Ust-Kamchatsk was demoted in status from urban-type settlement to a rural locality.

== Economy ==
There is a sea port, a fish-processing plant (FPP 66), a few woodworking factories, and Ust-Kamchatsk Airport (opened in 1937) in Ust-Kamchatsk.

== Climate ==
Ust-Kamchatsk has a subarctic climate (Köppen Dfc) although it has a strong maritime influence resulting in much less extreme winters, cooler summers and much heavier precipitation (both as winter snowfall and summer rainfall) compared to interior Siberia and even the Sea of Okhotsk coast. For instance, mean July maxima are 9 °C or 16.2 °F cooler than those of Yakutsk, whereas January means are around 27 °C or 48.6 °F warmer than the Sakha capital. The effect of the cold Oyashio Current in summer and frequent offshore winds from the Siberian High and Aleutian Low in winter means that, despite the substantial maritime moderation of winter temperatures, annual means are still 7.1 °C or 12.8 °F colder than Ketchikan at a similar latitude on the western coast of North America and 8.9 °C or 16.0 °F colder than Edinburgh at a similar latitude in northwestern Europe.

The windswept locality largely resembles a barren tundra, although large forests are nearby in more shielded locations.

Climate data for Ust-Kamchatsk (Climate ID:32408)
| Month | Jan | Feb | Mar | Apr | May | Jun | Jul | Aug | Sep | Oct | Nov | Dec | Year |
|---|---|---|---|---|---|---|---|---|---|---|---|---|---|
| Record high °C (°F) | 5.7 (42.3) | 6.5 (43.7) | 5.0 (41.0) | 10.3 (50.5) | 19.2 (66.6) | 26.9 (80.4) | 31.0 (87.8) | 29.0 (84.2) | 24.0 (75.2) | 17.1 (62.8) | 9.8 (49.6) | 8.1 (46.6) | 31.0 (87.8) |
| Mean maximum °C (°F) | 1.1 (34.0) | 0.9 (33.6) | 2.9 (37.2) | 7.0 (44.6) | 12.9 (55.2) | 21.2 (70.2) | 24.2 (75.6) | 23.4 (74.1) | 19.0 (66.2) | 12.3 (54.1) | 6.0 (42.8) | 2.0 (35.6) | 25.1 (77.2) |
| Mean daily maximum °C (°F) | −7.7 (18.1) | −6.8 (19.8) | −2.6 (27.3) | 1.0 (33.8) | 5.4 (41.7) | 12.0 (53.6) | 16.4 (61.5) | 16.9 (62.4) | 13.8 (56.8) | 7.0 (44.6) | 0.2 (32.4) | −5.2 (22.6) | 4.2 (39.6) |
| Daily mean °C (°F) | −11.6 (11.1) | −10.9 (12.4) | −6.5 (20.3) | −2.5 (27.5) | 2.3 (36.1) | 7.8 (46.0) | 12.2 (54.0) | 12.9 (55.2) | 9.6 (49.3) | 3.2 (37.8) | −3.1 (26.4) | −9.1 (15.6) | 0.4 (32.6) |
| Mean daily minimum °C (°F) | −16 (3) | −15.5 (4.1) | −11.2 (11.8) | −6.4 (20.5) | −0.5 (31.1) | 4.3 (39.7) | 8.6 (47.5) | 9.4 (48.9) | 5.5 (41.9) | −0.7 (30.7) | −6.7 (19.9) | −13.3 (8.1) | −3.5 (25.6) |
| Mean minimum °C (°F) | −31.5 (−24.7) | −29.8 (−21.6) | −26.0 (−14.8) | −17.4 (0.7) | −6.5 (20.3) | 0.0 (32.0) | 3.8 (38.8) | 3.9 (39.0) | −0.8 (30.6) | −8.9 (16.0) | −17.3 (0.9) | −26 (−15) | −33 (−27) |
| Record low °C (°F) | −41 (−42) | −39.4 (−38.9) | −37 (−35) | −29 (−20) | −15.7 (3.7) | −2.6 (27.3) | 0.0 (32.0) | −0.3 (31.5) | −5.1 (22.8) | −14 (7) | −27.2 (−17.0) | −38 (−36) | −41 (−42) |
| Average precipitation mm (inches) | 85.6 (3.37) | 70.9 (2.79) | 63.9 (2.52) | 36.0 (1.42) | 39.9 (1.57) | 35.1 (1.38) | 44.8 (1.76) | 76.1 (3.00) | 62.2 (2.45) | 67.8 (2.67) | 67.3 (2.65) | 73.5 (2.89) | 723.1 (28.47) |
| Average precipitation days (≥ 1.0 mm) | 12.6 | 11.9 | 10.7 | 7.1 | 7.6 | 6.8 | 7.8 | 10.2 | 9.8 | 9.6 | 9.6 | 11.5 | 115.2 |
| Mean monthly sunshine hours | 71.3 | 87.6 | 148.8 | 186.0 | 173.6 | 174.0 | 151.9 | 151.9 | 156.0 | 130.2 | 96.0 | 58.9 | 1,586.2 |
Source 1: Roshydromet
Source 2: HKO (precipitation and sunshine)
