= Kutka =

Creation deity of Itelmens of Kamchatka

Kutka, also styled as Kutga or Kutku, is a creation deity of the Itelmens of Kamchatka. Some sources indicate he was a supreme deity but others see him being subsidiary to Dusdaechschitsh, a uniquely supreme being. His wife, Chachy, is smarter than him. His son is Haetsch.
