= Esso (village) =

Esso Эссо
- Selo
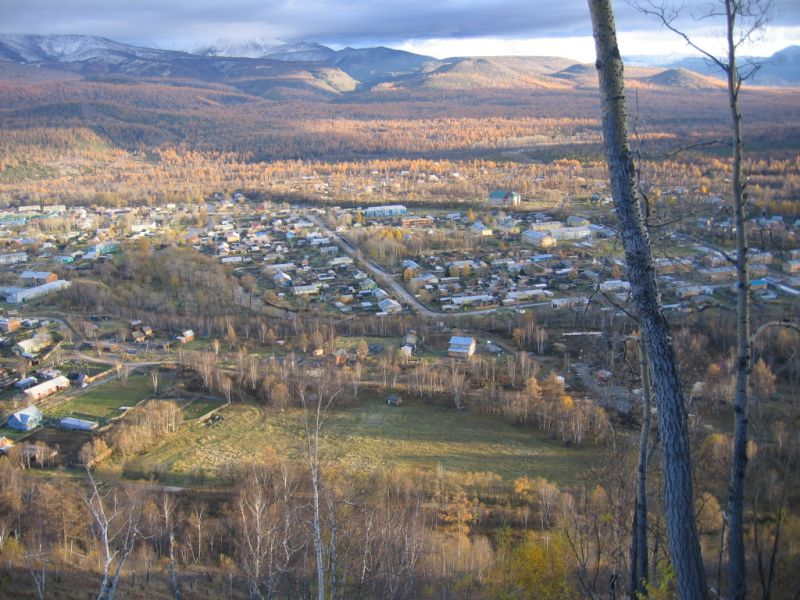
- Interactive map of Esso
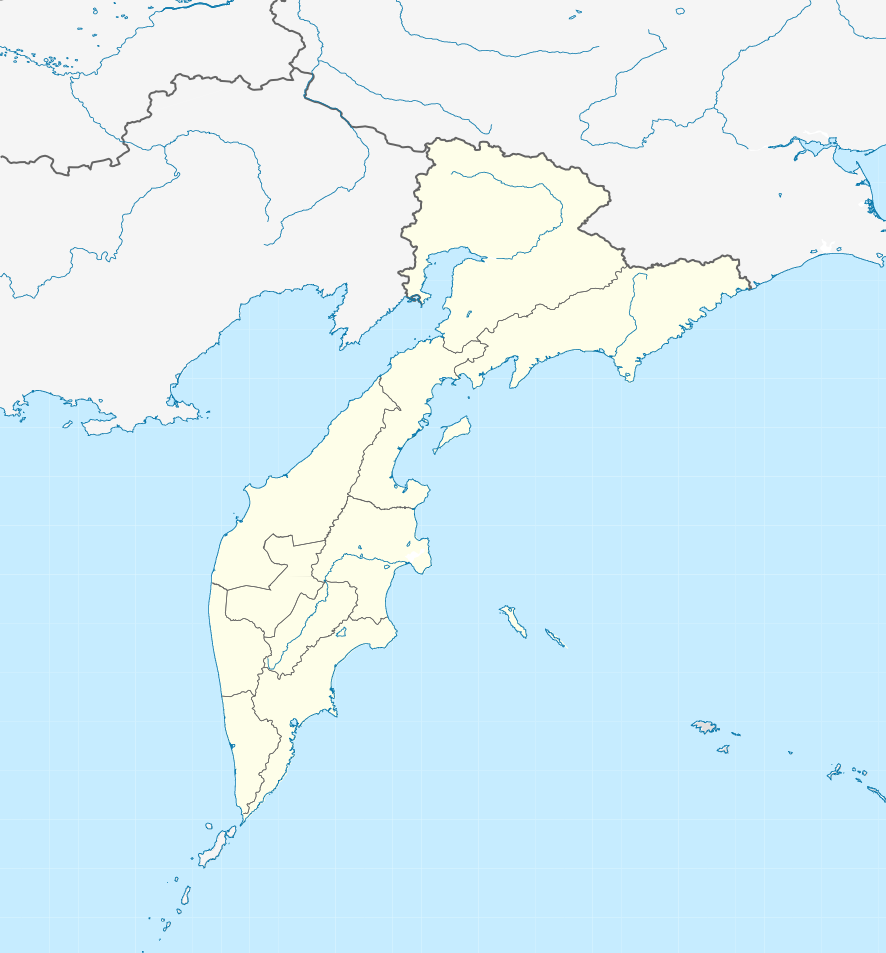
- Location of Esso Esso (Kamchatka Krai)
- Coordinates: 55°55′50″N 158°41′41″E
- Country: Russia
- Federal subject: Kamchatka Krai
- Administrative district: Bystrinsky District

Population (2010 Census)
  - Total: 2,012
  - Estimate (2021): 1,879 (−6.6%)
- Time zone: UTC+12 (MSK+9)
- Postal code: 684350
- OKTMO ID: 30604401101

Esso (Russian: Эссо) is a village in Kamchatka Krai, Russia. It is the administrative centre of Bystrinsky District. It has been described as one of the most scenic villages in Russia. Population of the village is 1,996 people (2021 census); 2,012 people (2010 census); 2,081 people (2002 census); 2,269 people (1989 Soviet census).

== Geography ==
Esso is located in the central part of the Kamchatka Peninsula. It is roughly 319 km (198 mi) from Petropavlovsk-Kamchatsky, and roughly 6,529 km (4,057 mi) from Moscow. It is located at the convergence of the Bystraya and Uksichan Rivers.

== Attractions ==
Esso has multiple notable sites, making it attractive to tourists. These include hot springs near the edge of the village, with temperatures often reaching 65 °C (149 °F). Thermal springs also heat an outdoor swimming pool in the central part of the village. In addition to its hot springs, Esso is home to Kamchatka's only ethnographic museum. The museum documents the traditions and architecture of the indigenous Even and Koryak peoples, as well as those of Russian and Cossack settlers.

== Climate ==
Esso's climate can be classified as subarctic, or Dfc under the Köppen climate classification.

Climate data for Esso
Month	Jan	Feb	Mar	Apr	May	Jun	Jul	Aug	Sep	Oct	Nov	Dec	Year
Record high °C (°F)	5.2 (41.4)	7.2 (45.0)	8.5 (47.3)	16.8 (62.2)	24.2 (75.6)	30.1 (86.2)	33.2 (91.8)	30.3 (86.5)	26.1 (79.0)	18.7 (65.7)	10.8 (51.4)	10.8 (51.4)	33.2 (91.8)
Mean daily maximum °C (°F)	−11.8 (10.8)	−8.8 (16.2)	−3.7 (25.3)	1.8 (35.2)	10.0 (50.0)	17.1 (62.8)	21.0 (69.8)	18.4 (65.1)	12.7 (54.9)	4.3 (39.7)	−4.4 (24.1)	−11.1 (12.0)	3.8 (38.8)
Daily mean °C (°F)	−17.4 (0.7)	−15.4 (4.3)	−10.4 (13.3)	−3.6 (25.5)	4.4 (39.9)	10.9 (51.6)	14.6 (58.3)	12.5 (54.5)	6.8 (44.2)	−0.4 (31.3)	−9.0 (15.8)	−15.8 (3.6)	−1.9 (28.6)
Mean daily minimum °C (°F)	−22.2 (−8.0)	−20.8 (−5.4)	−16.4 (2.5)	−9.0 (15.8)	−1.3 (29.7)	4.4 (39.9)	8.3 (46.9)	7.3 (45.1)	1.9 (35.4)	−4.2 (24.4)	−13.3 (8.1)	−20.2 (−4.4)	−7.1 (19.2)
Record low °C (°F)	−42.4 (−44.3)	−41.2 (−42.2)	−40.2 (−40.4)	−30.6 (−23.1)	−17.0 (1.4)	−5.5 (22.1)	−3.3 (26.1)	−5.8 (21.6)	−11.7 (10.9)	−21.1 (−6.0)	−31.5 (−24.7)	−38.4 (−37.1)	−42.4 (−44.3)
Average precipitation mm (inches)	20 (0.8)	17 (0.7)	23 (0.9)	14 (0.6)	19 (0.7)	38 (1.5)	60 (2.4)	66 (2.6)	46 (1.8)	35 (1.4)	34 (1.3)	23 (0.9)	395 (15.6)
Source: www.pogodaiklimat.ru
