= Bystrinsky District =

Bystrinsky District Быстринский район (Russian)
- District

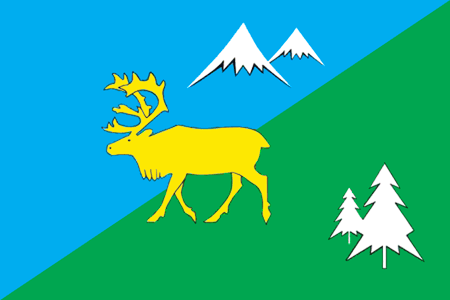
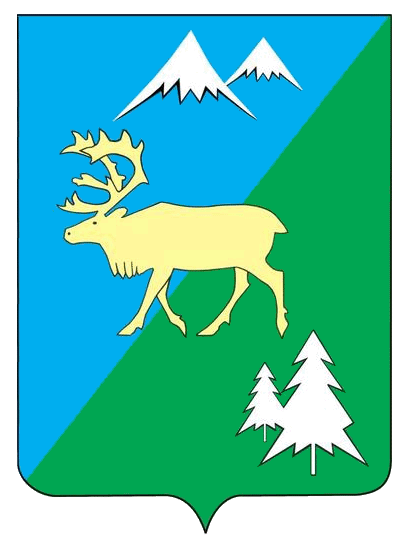
- Flag Coat of arms
- Location of Bystrinsky District in Kamchatka Krai
- Coordinates: 55°55′50″N 158°41′41″E
- Country: Russia
- Federal subject: Kamchatka Krai
- Administrative center: Esso

Area
  - Total: 23,377 km^{2} (9,026 sq mi)

Population (2010 Census)
  - Total: 2,560
  - Density: 0.110/km^{2} (0.284/sq mi)
  - Urban: 0%
  - Rural: 100%

Administrative structure
  - Inhabited localities: 2 rural localities

Municipal structure
  - Municipally incorporated as: Bystrinsky District
  - Municipal divisions: 0 urban settlements, 2 rural settlements
- Time zone: UTC+12 (MSK+9)
- OKTMO ID: 30604000

Bystrinsky District (Russian: Быстри́нский райо́н) is an administrative and municipal district (raion) of Kamchatka Krai, Russia, one of the eleven in the krai. It is located in the southern central part of the krai. The area of the district is 23,377 square kilometers (9,026 sq mi). Its administrative center is the rural locality (a selo) of Esso. Population: 2,560 (2010 census); 2,660 (2002 census); 2,947 (1989 Soviet census). The population of Esso accounts for 78.6% of the district's total population.

== Climate ==
Bystrinsky District has a subarctic climate (Köppen Dfc). Although the winters are not so cold as in interior Siberia, they are around 8 °C or 14.4 °F colder than on the Pacific coast of Kamchatka at the same latitude, so that discontinuous permafrost underlays the region. Precipitation, however, is much less than on the Pacific coast as the moist winds from the northern side of the Aleutian Low dry out before reaching the region.

Climate data for Esso (Climate ID:32363)
| Month | Jan | Feb | Mar | Apr | May | Jun | Jul | Aug | Sep | Oct | Nov | Dec | Year |
|---|---|---|---|---|---|---|---|---|---|---|---|---|---|
| Record high °C (°F) | 5.2 (41.4) | 7.2 (45.0) | 7.6 (45.7) | 16.8 (62.2) | 24.2 (75.6) | 30.1 (86.2) | 32.0 (89.6) | 30.3 (86.5) | 26.1 (79.0) | 18.7 (65.7) | 10.8 (51.4) | 10.8 (51.4) | 32.0 (89.6) |
| Daily mean °C (°F) | −18.3 (−0.9) | −15.9 (3.4) | −11.1 (12.0) | −3.7 (25.3) | 4.0 (39.2) | 10.7 (51.3) | 14.1 (57.4) | 12.1 (53.8) | 6.5 (43.7) | −0.3 (31.5) | −9.3 (15.3) | −16.2 (2.8) | −2.3 (27.9) |
| Record low °C (°F) | −42.4 (−44.3) | −41.2 (−42.2) | −40.2 (−40.4) | −30.6 (−23.1) | −17 (1) | −5.5 (22.1) | −3.3 (26.1) | −5.8 (21.6) | −11.7 (10.9) | −21.1 (−6.0) | −31.5 (−24.7) | −38.4 (−37.1) | −42.4 (−44.3) |
| Average precipitation mm (inches) | 18 (0.7) | 17 (0.7) | 19 (0.7) | 12 (0.5) | 20 (0.8) | 39 (1.5) | 66 (2.6) | 69 (2.7) | 40 (1.6) | 35 (1.4) | 33 (1.3) | 21 (0.8) | 389 (15.3) |
Source: Roshydromet

== Demographics ==
Ethnic composition (2010):

- Russians – 50.4%
- Evens – 34.5%
- Koryaks – 4.9%
- Ukrainians – 2.5%
- Itelmens – 2.4%
- Tatars – 1.4%
- Others – 3.9%

Ethnic composition (2020). Roughly 50% of the population is indigenous:

- Russians – 49.5%
- Evens – 36.7%
- Koryaks – 5.1%
- Itelmens – 2.9%
- Kamchadals – 1.1%
- Chukchis – 0.4%
- Others – 4.3%

== Sources ==
- Законодательное Собрание Камчатского края. Закон №46 от 29 апреля 2008 г. «Об административно-территориальном устройстве Камчатского края», в ред. Закона №659 от 30 июля 2015 г. «О внесении изменения в статью 5 Закона Камчатского края "Об административно-территориальном устройстве Камчатского края"». Вступил в силу со дня официального опубликования. Опубликован: "Официальные Ведомости", №65-69, 6 мая 2008 г. (Legislative Assembly of Kamchatka Krai. Law #46 of April 29, 2008 On the Administrative-Territorial Structure of Kamchatka Krai, as amended by the Law #659 of July 30, 2015 On Amending Article 5 of the Law of Kamchatka Krai "On the Administrative-Territorial Structure of Kamchatka Krai". Effective as of the day of the official publication.).
- Совет народных депутатов Камчатской области. Закон №243 от 17 декабря 2004 г. «Об установлении границ и о наделении статусом муниципальных образований на територии Быстринского района Камчатской области», в ред. Закона №563 от 29 декабря 2014 г. «О внесении изменений в Закон Камчатской области "Об установлении границ и о наделении статусом муниципальных образований на територии Быстринского района Камчатской области"». Вступил в силу со дня официального опубликования. Опубликован: "Официальные Ведомости", №86–94, 30 декабря 2004 г. (Council of People's Deputies of Kamchatka Oblast. Law #243 of December 17, 2004 On Establishing the Borders of and Graning the Status to the Municipal Formations on the Territory of Bystrinsky District of Kamchatka Oblast, as amended by the Law #563 of December 29, 2014 On Amending the Law of Kamchatka Oblast "On Establishing the Borders of and Graning the Status to the Municipal Formations on the Territory of Bystrinsky District of Kamchatka Oblast". Effective as of the day of the official publication.).
