= Karaginsky District =

Karaginsky District Карагинский район (Russian)
- District
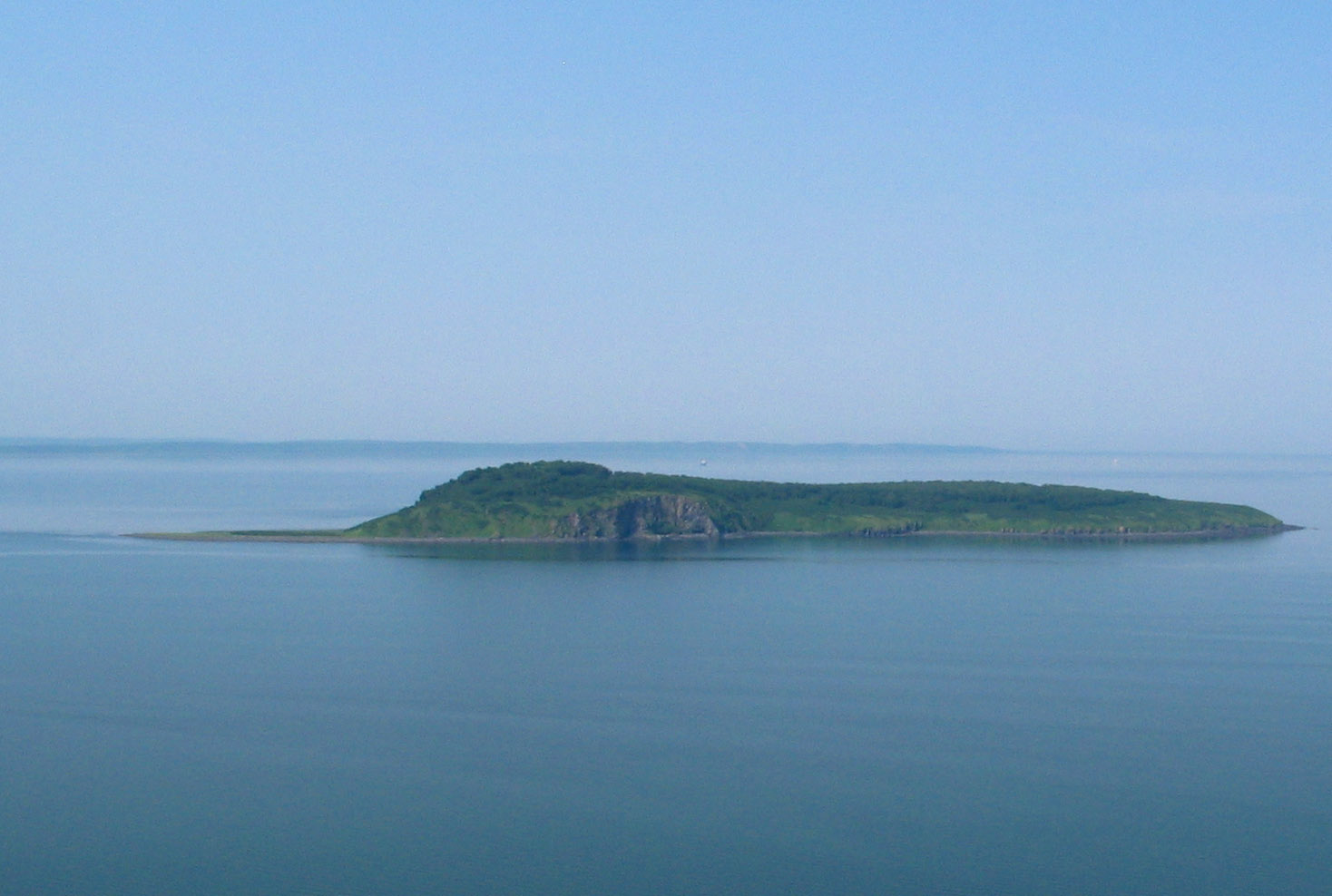
- Manchu island, Karaginsky District

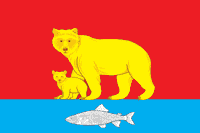
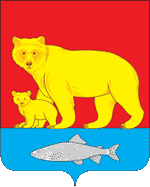
- Flag Coat of arms
- Location of Karaginsky District in Koryak Okrug, Kamchatka Krai
- Coordinates: 59°14′49″N 163°03′45″E
- Country: Russia
- Federal subject: Kamchatka Krai
- Established: 1 April 1926
- Administrative center: Ossora

Area
  - Total: 40,641 km^{2} (15,692 sq mi)

Population (2010 Census)
  - Total: 4,076
  - Estimate (2023): 3,403
  - Density: 0.1003/km^{2} (0.2598/sq mi)
  - Urban: 52.3%
  - Rural: 47.7%

Administrative structure
  - Inhabited localities: 1 urban-type settlements, 5 rural localities

Municipal structure
  - Municipally incorporated as: Karaginsky Municipal District
  - Municipal divisions: 1 urban settlements, 5 rural settlements
- Time zone: UTC+12 (MSK+9)
- OKTMO ID: 30824000
- Website: http://xn--80aajuagbe0a0ap.xn--p1ai/

Karaginsky District (Russian: Караги́нский райо́н) is an administrative and municipal district (raion) of Koryak Okrug of Kamchatka Krai, Russia, one of the eleven in the krai. It is located in the northern central part of the krai. The area of the district is 40,641 square kilometers (15,692 sq mi). Its administrative center is the urban locality (a settlement) of Ossora. Population: 3,437 (2021 census); 4,076 (2010 census); 5,656 (2002 census); 8,777 (1989 Soviet census). The population of Ossora accounts for 53.6% of the district's total population.

Ethnic composition (2021):

- Russians – 58.9%
- Koryaks – 34%
- Ukrainians – 1.3%
- Others – 5.8%

Karaginsky District is at one end of the world's longest estimated straight-line path over water (32,090 km, ending at the Sonmiani in the Balochistan province in Pakistan).
