= Ust-Kamchatsky District =

Ust-Kamchatsky District Усть-Камчатский район (Russian)
- District
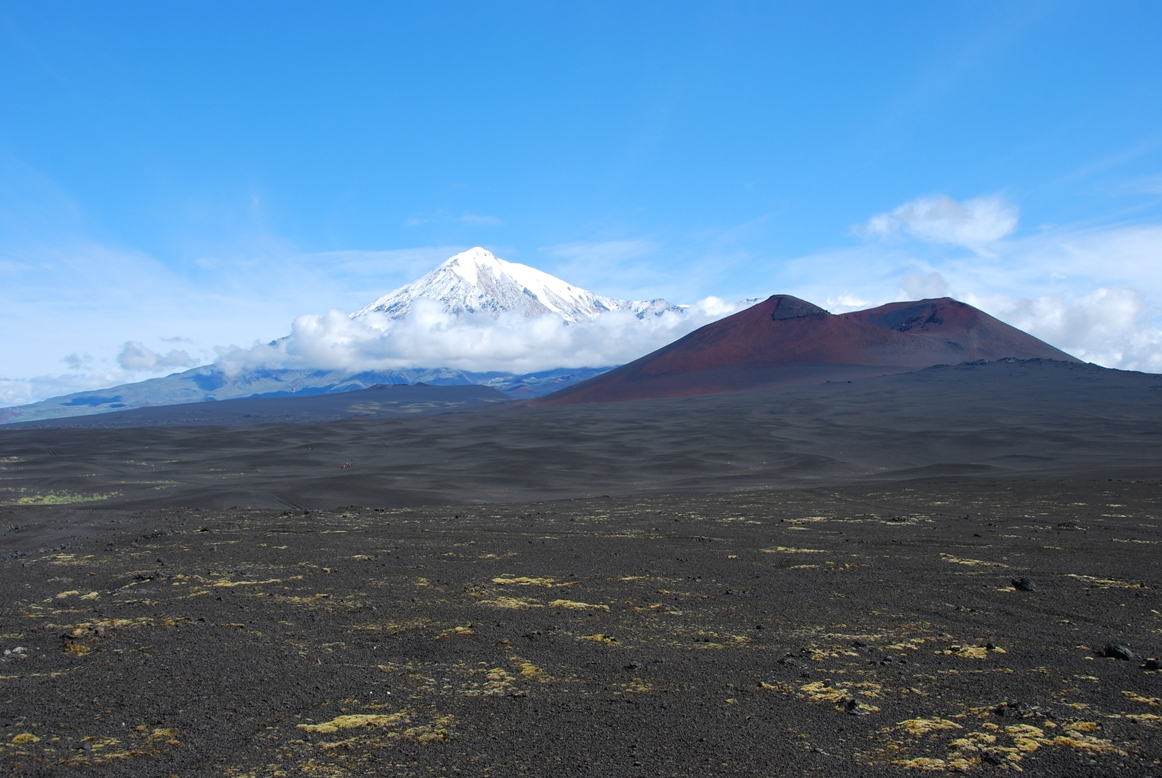
- Tolbachik, Ust-Kamchatsky District

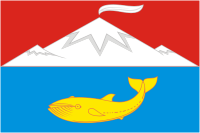
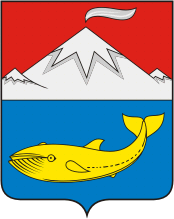
- Flag Coat of arms
- Location of Ust-Kamchatsky District in Kamchatka Krai
- Coordinates: 56°13′39″N 162°28′41″E
- Country: Russia
- Federal subject: Kamchatka Krai
- Established: 1 April 1926
- Administrative center: Ust-Kamchatsk

Area
  - Total: 40,837 km^{2} (15,767 sq mi)

Population (2010 Census)
  - Total: 11,744
  - Density: 0.28758/km^{2} (0.74483/sq mi)
  - Urban: 0%
  - Rural: 100%

Administrative structure
  - Inhabited localities: 5 rural localities

Municipal structure
  - Municipally incorporated as: Ust-Kamchatsky Municipal District
  - Municipal divisions: 0 urban settlements, 3 rural settlements
- Time zone: UTC+12 (MSK+9)
- OKTMO ID: 30619000
- Website: http://www.ust-kam.ru/

Ust-Kamchatsky District (Russian: Усть-Камча́тский райо́н) is an administrative and municipal district (raion) of Kamchatka Krai, Russia, one of the eleven in the krai. It is located in the east of the krai. The area of the district is 40,837 square kilometers (15,767 sq mi). Its administrative center is the rural locality (a settlement) of Ust-Kamchatsk. Population: 11,744 (2010 census); 15,084 (2002 census); 28,867 (1989 Soviet census). The population of Ust-Kamchatsk accounts for 37.1% of the district's total population.
