= Itelmens =

Ethnic group of Kamchatka Krai, Russia

Итәнмә’н Ительмены
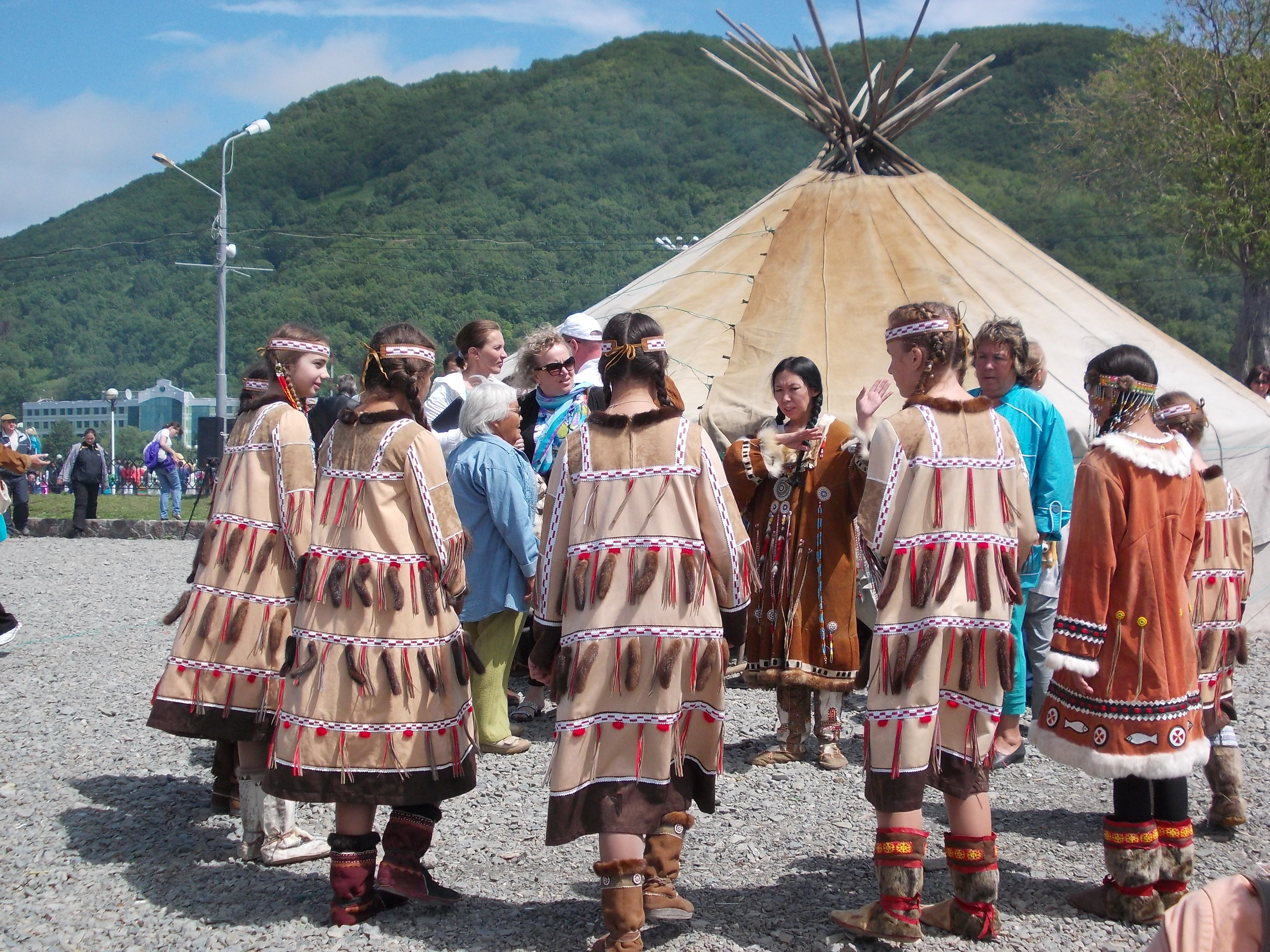
- An Itelmen dance group, 2013

Total population
- 3,211

Regions with significant populations
- Russia: Kamchatka Krai: 3,193
- Ukraine: 18

Languages
- Itelmen, Russian

Religion
- Polytheism, Shamanism, Russian Orthodoxy

Related ethnic groups
- Kamchadals, other Chukotko-Kamchatkan peoples

The Itelmens (Itelmen: Итәнмән, romanized: Itənmən; Russian: Ительмены, romanized: Itel'meny) are an indigenous ethnic group of the Kamchatka Peninsula in Russia. The Itelmen language is distantly related to Chukchi and Koryak, forming the Chukotko-Kamchatkan language family, but it is now virtually extinct, the vast majority of ethnic Itelmens being native speakers of Russian.

Native peoples of Kamchatka (Itelmen, Ainu, Koryaks, and Chuvans), collectively referred to as Kamchadals, had a substantial hunter-gatherer and fishing society with up to fifty thousand natives inhabiting the peninsula before they were decimated during the Russian conquest, both by brutal repressions of the rebellions of locals and by a major smallpox epidemic, in the 18th century. So much intermarriage took place between the natives and the Cossacks that Kamchadal now refers to the majority mixed population, while the term Itelmens became reserved for persistent speakers of the Itelmen language. By 1993, there were fewer than 100 elderly speakers of the language left, but some 2,400 people considered themselves ethnic Itelmen in the 1989 census. By 2002, this number had risen to 3,180, and there are attempts at reviving the language. According to the 2010 Russian census, there were 3,193 Itelmens.

Itelmens resided primarily in the valley of the Kamchatka River in the middle of the peninsula. One of the few sources describing the Itelmen prior to assimilation is that of Georg Wilhelm Steller, who accompanied Vitus Bering on his Great Northern Expedition (Second Expedition to Kamchatka).

== Pre-conquest Itelmen society ==
Resettlement of Itelmens in the Far Eastern Federal District by urban and rural settlements in%, 2010 census

=== Village structure ===
Itelmens tended to settle along the various rivers of the Kamchatka Peninsula. At the time of the arrival of the first Cossacks to the peninsula, in the early 1650s, villages numbered between 200 and 300 residents, a number which had dwindled to 40 or 50 at most by the time of the composition of Steller's account in 1744. Each village was centred around a single patriarchal household. Generally, young men seeking marriage joined the village of their wife. When a village became too large to sustain itself, it was divided and a portion of the villagers would create a settlement at another point along the same river. Steller describes a great variation of dialects from river to river, as the Itelmens predominantly communicated with communities which shared the river.

=== Itelmen houses ===
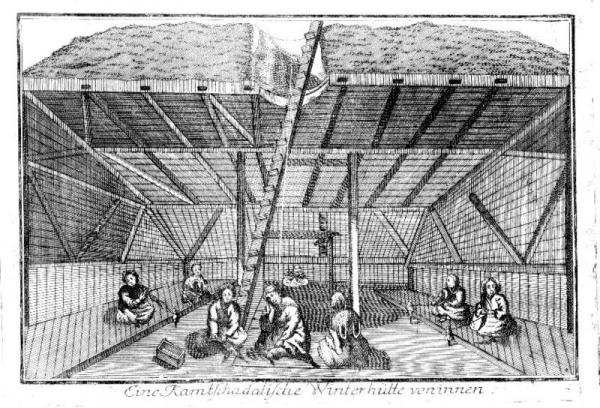
Itelmen and their winter dwelling, 1774

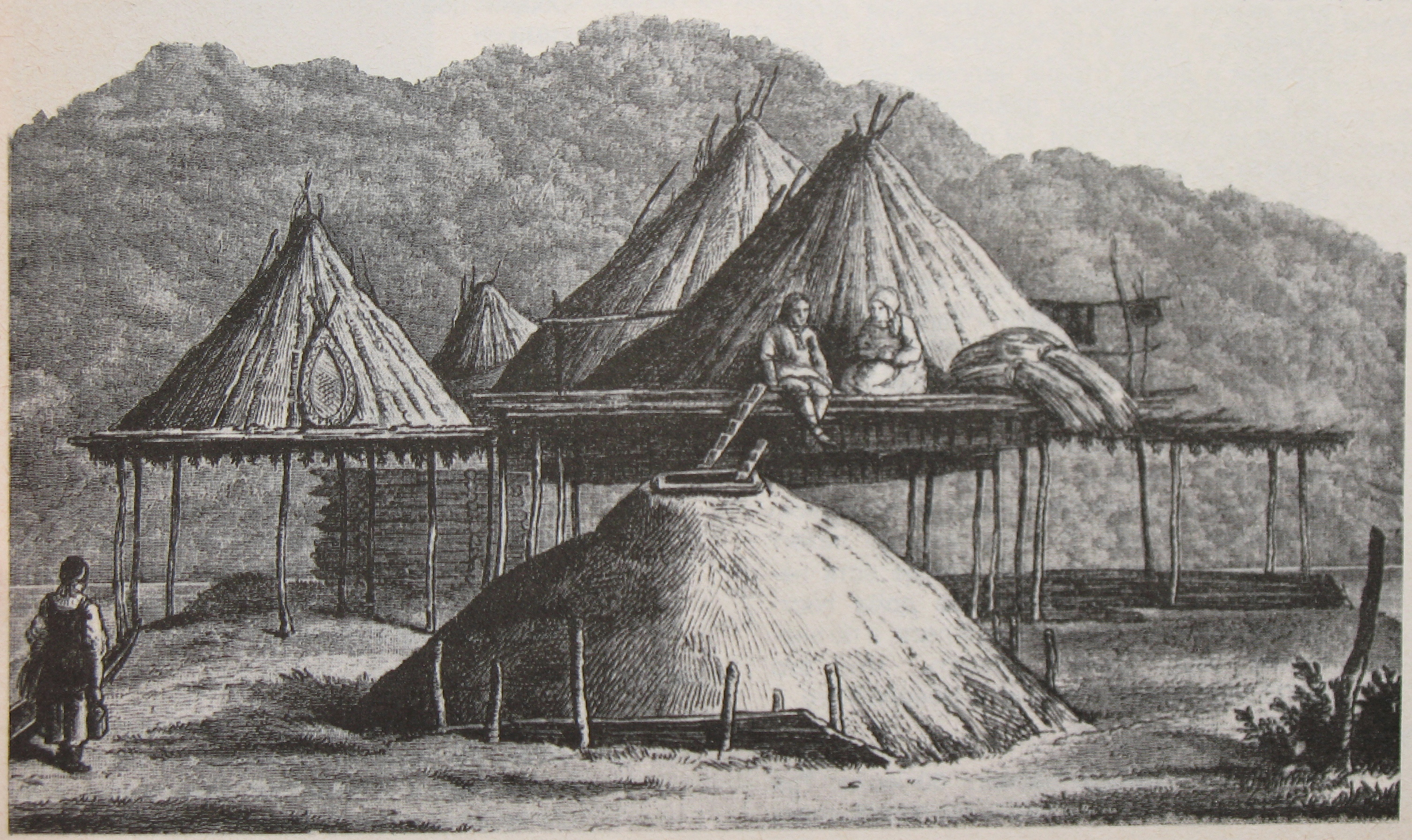
Winter dwelling and summer dwellings

Itelmens lived in different houses during the summer and winter seasons. The winter house, which was inhabited beginning in November, was dug into the soil 90–150 cm (3–5 ft) in the shape of a rectangle. The walls were then covered with sticks and straw to prevent moisture from penetrating the interior. Four beams at the centre of the dwelling supported the roof of the house, upon which rafters were laid, connecting the top of the yurt to the earthen walls. Atop the wooden rafters, approximately 30 cm (1 ft) of straw was laid, on top of which the excavated dirt was placed and stamped down. An opening atop the yurt, off to one side of the four posts and supported by the two beams, served as a smoke hole and an entrance. Opposite the fireplace, they made a passageway to the outside facing the river, which was left open only when fires were lit. Different sleeping quarters were demarcated by pieces of wood on which straw mats and reindeer or seal skins were used as bedding.

In the summer months, the Itelmens live in raised houses called pehm or pehmy. As the ground thaws in the summer, the floors of the winter houses began to flood. In the summer months, each family in the village lived in their own house, rather than sharing a large house as in winter. These raised homes, or balagans as the Cossacks called them, were pyramids on raised platforms, with a door on the south and the north side. The extreme moisture of the climate required the raising of the homes for dry storage. Most villages, in addition to summer and winter houses, contained straw huts built on the ground, which were used for cooking food, boiling salt from sea water and rendering fat. Villages were surrounded by an earthen wall or palisades until the arrival of the Russians, after which this practice was banned.

=== Religion ===
The Itelmens subscribed to a polytheistic religion. The creative god was referred to as Kutka or Kutga. Though he is regarded as the creator of all things, Steller describes a complete lack of veneration for him. The Itelmens attribute the problems and difficulties of life to his stupidity, and are quick to scold or curse him. They believed Kutka to be married to an intelligent woman named Chachy, who was said to have kept him from much foolishness and to have corrected him constantly. Kutka was believed to have lived on the greatest rivers of the Kamchatka Peninsula, and is said to have left a son and daughter for each river, which is used to explain the great variety of dialects present on the peninsula. The Itelmens also worshiped several spirits, Mitgh, who dwelled in the ocean and lived in the form of a fish. They believed in forest sprites, who were called ushakhtchu, said to resemble people. The mountain gods were called gamuli or little souls, who resided in the high mountains, especially volcanoes. The clouds were believed to be inhabited by the god billukai, who was responsible for thunder, lightning and storms. They postulated a devil, who was called Kamma, who was said to live in a tree outside Nizhnoi village, which was annually shot up with arrows.

=== Division of labor ===
In general, labor was very clearly divided based on gender, though many tasks were shared. When fishing, the men and women paddled together, however only the men fished while the women performed all related tasks such as cleaning and drying the fish and collecting the eggs. In home construction, men performed all the wood work, digging and carpentry while the women performed the task of thatching the straw roof and cutting the straw with bone sickles made from bear shoulder blades. The women prepare the whole fish supply, except fermented fish and dog food, which is left to the men. The women perform all the tasks of gathering seeds, berries and fireweed, which is used as a type of tea. From grass they construct mats, bags, baskets and boxes for storage and transportation. Dog and reindeer skins are tanned, dyed and sewn into the various garments worn by men and women.

=== Food ===
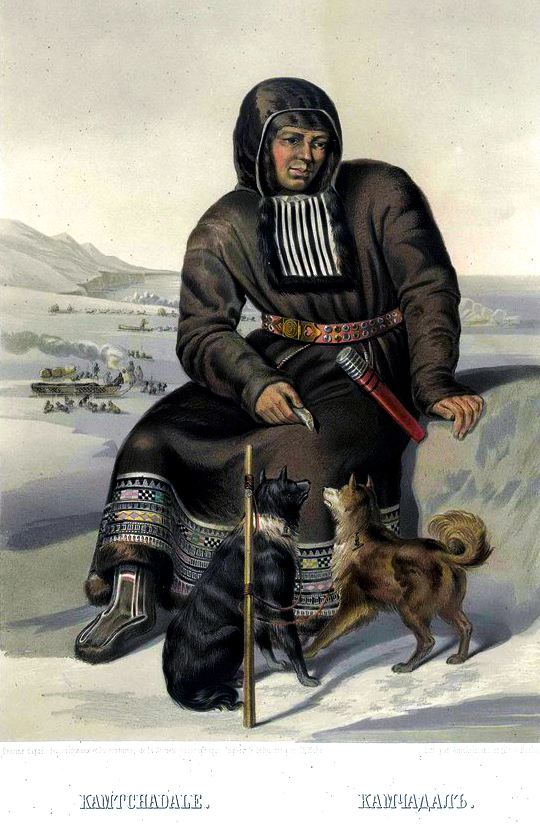
An Itelmen (1862)

The Itelmen seldom observed a set eating time except when entertaining. They also seldom ate as a family unit except when eating opana (warm food) or fresh fish. Unlike their indigenous island neighbors, the Evenks and Yakuts, they do not enjoy fried food, eating mostly a diet of cold food. A common staple was fish eggs with willow or birch bark. A common food enjoyed at festivities, selaga, was a mash made of sarana, pine nuts, fireweed, cow parsnip, bistort roots, and various berries cooked in seal, whale or fish oil. In Lopatkan, a fermented berry drink was consumed, though there is no indication that any other Itelmen settlements created fermented drinks.

== Cossack conquest ==
Steller cites anecdotal evidence of several Russian forays into Kamchatka prior to the arrival of Vladimir Atlasov. Atlasov began his conquest of Kamchatka by sending Luka Morozko on reconnaissance foray in 1695, and embarked himself a year later with 120 men, half of whom were Yukakghir auxiliaries, to gather tribute and to annex the region for the crown. Leaving from Anadyrsk bay on the backs of reindeer, they explored much of the western coast and crossed the mountains to the east to subdue the population there. By mid July 1696, he had reached the Kamchatka River, at which point he divided his party in two, one band returning westward and the other remaining on the eastern coast. At this point the Yukaghir auxiliaries rebelled, killing six Russians and wounding six. A band of Koryaks additionally absconded with Atlasov's itinerant reindeer herd, but were chased down by the Russians and killed to one man.

At the head of the Kamchatka River, they first encountered several heavily fortified Itelmen settlements. Here they were initially greeted cordially by the natives, and received tribute without contest. They proceeded to sack a rival Itelmen village upriver, cementing the alliance with the Itelmens. The first Cossack settlement in the area was Bolsheretsk, founded in 1703 by Atlasov, although Steller notes that it was already a prominent village at the arrival of “that wind-bag Atlasov.”

The Itelmens he found there had captured a Japanese merchant's clerk named Dembei, who had been part of an expedition that was shipwrecked and overtaken by Itelmens upon arrival at the Kamchatka River. Atlasov, who initially assumed the prisoner to be a Hindu from India, resulting from confusion over the word "Hondo" or Tokyo, had him sent to Moscow where Peter the Great had him establish a Japanese-language school.

In 1706, senior governing officials were killed by a band of Koryaks and a period of general lawlessness abounded. The Cossacks began to take great liberties with the legal amount of tribute required and began the practice of taking Itelmens as slaves, often gambling with and trading them. During this time, rebellions were frequent. After serving some time in jail, Atlasov resumed legal control in an effort to reimpose law and order on the peninsula. In 1711 his men mutinied and he fled to Nizhnekamchatsk. There he was given asylum, only to be assassinated in his bed. The mutineers were excused from the death penalty provided they continued government work. Thus an expedition to the southern tip of the peninsula and onto the Kuril Islands was conducted, led by Danila Antsiferov and Ivan Kozyrevsky.

Under his rule, the Itelmens allied with their northern neighbors, the Koryaks, and burned Antsyferov to death on his bed. The rebellions did not quiet down until the 1715 outbreak of smallpox on the peninsula, at which point the Russian Crown had lost five years of tribute and the lives of at least 200 Russians.

Over time, the remaining populations were assimilated. Due to increasingly large suicide rates, the Crown made a law prohibiting natives from taking their own lives. A large mixed population emerged, who were Russian Orthodox in religion, but distinctly Itelmen in looks and customs. The government granted legal status to these mixed children readily, and Itelmen women were legally allowed to marry into the Orthodox Religion. By the arrival of Bering's second expedition to Kamchatka, the population had shrunk to approximately 10% of what it was prior to the arrival of the Cossacks.

== Subsequent history ==
Goods such as guns, tobacco, tea, sugar, and vodka became widely available to Itelmens in the 19th century. Over time, many Itelmens accepted baptism into the Russian Orthodox Church, though animism remained widespread in practice. The Itelmen population was recorded as 4,029 at the 1889 census; by 1959, this had fallen to 1,109, though the population had risen to 2,480 by the 1989 census. Russian-medium schooling became the norm in the 1930s, and as of the 1989 census, fewer than one Itelmen in five could speak the Itelmen language.

== See also ==
- Haplogroup G (mtDNA)
- Koekchuch
