= Koryak Okrug =

Administrative division of Kamchatka, Russia

Koryak Autonomous Okrug Корякский автономный округ
- Former Okrug of Russia
- 1930–2007
- Flag Coat of arms

- Location of Koryakia within Russia
- Capital: Palana
- Population
  - 2002: 25,157
- Government
- Governor
  - 1991–96: Sergey Lyoushkin
  - 1996–2000: Valentina Bronevich
  - 2000–05: Vladimir Loginov
  - 2005–07: Oleg Kozhemyako
- Legislature: Duma
- History
  - Established: 10 December 1930
  - Disestablished: 1 July 2007
- Contained within
  - Self-governing part of: Far Eastern Krai (1930–34); Kamchatka Oblast (1934–2007)
Preceded by	Succeeded by
Far Eastern Krai	Kamchatka Krai
- Today part of: Russia ∟ Kamchatka Krai

Koryak Okrug (Russian: Корякский округ, romanized: Koryakskiy okrug, pronounced [kɐˈrʲakskʲɪj ˈokrʊk]; Koryak: Чав’чываокруг, romanized: Caw’cywaokrug), or Koryakia (/kɔːrˈjækiə/; Russian: Корякия, pronounced [kɐˈrʲækʲɪjə]), was an administrative division with a special status within Kamchatka Krai, Russia. It was a federal subject of Russia (an autonomous okrug of Kamchatka Oblast) from 1931 until July 1, 2007, when it merged with Kamchatka Oblast. Prior to the merger, it was called Koryak Autonomous Okrug (Russian: Корякский автономный округ). Its administrative center was the urban locality (an urban-type settlement) of Palana. Population: 18,759 (2010 census); 25,157 (2002 census); 39,363 (1989 Soviet census).

== Demographics ==
As of the 2002 census, Koryaks constituted about a quarter of the population. At the time, it had the smallest population of all the federal subjects, despite being ranked seventeenth in size, at 301,500 square kilometers (116,400 sq mi), encompassing part of the northern half of Kamchatka Peninsula.

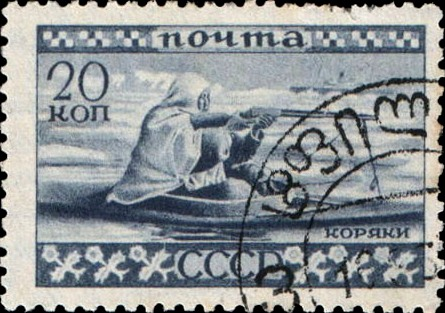
Koryaks depicted on a 1933 "Peoples of the Soviet Union" stamp

=== Vital statistics ===
	Average population (x 1000)	Live births	Deaths	Natural change	Crude birth rate (per 1000)	Crude death rate (per 1000)	Natural change (per 1000)
1970	31	683	356	327	22.0	11.5	10.5
1975	33	706	374	332	21.4	11.3	10.1
1980	35	701	351	350	20.0	10.0	10.0
1985	37	793	289	504	21.4	7.8	13.6
1990	38	635	342	293	16.9	9.1	7.8
1991	38	623	350	273	16.6	9.3	7.3
1992	37	611	369	242	16.7	10.1	6.6
1993	34	459	433	26	13.3	12.6	0.8
1994	32	433	460	27	13.5	14.3	-0.8
1995	31	382	481	99	12.5	15.8	-3.2
1996	29	374	436	62	12.7	14.8	-2.1
1997	29	373	400	27	13.0	13.9	-0.9
1998	28	396	355	41	14.2	12.7	1.5
1999	27	319	397	78	11.8	14.7	-2.9
2000	26	289	391	102	11.0	14.9	-3.9
2001	26	298	390	92	11.6	15.1	-3.6
2002	25	310	376	66	12.3	14.9	-2.6
2003	24	268	462	194	11.0	19.0	-8.0
2004	24	339	463	124	14.4	19.7	-5.3
2005	23	294	466	172	12.9	20.5	-7.6
2006	22	270	366	96	12.3	16.7	-4.4
2007	21	280	351	71	13.2	16.5	-3.3
2008	20	267	368	101	13.0	18.0	-4.9
2009	20	268	365	97	13.6	18.5	-4.9
2010	19	233	397	164	12.3	20.9	-8.7

=== Ethnic groups ===
About 50.5% of the total population is indigenous, the Koryaks being the largest such group. They are, however, outnumbered by the ethnic Russians.

Ethnic group	1939 Census		1959 Census		1970 Census		1979 Census		1989 Census		2002 Census		2010 Census		2021 Census	
Ethnic group	Number	%	Number	%	Number	%	Number	%	Number	%	Number	%	Number	%	Number	%
Koryaks	6,855	27.2%	5,010	18.2%	5,893	19.1%	5,660	16.2%	6,572	16.5%	6,710	26.7%	5,676	30.3%	5,215	33.4%
Chukchis	1,267	5.0%	1,062	3.9%	1,164	3.8%	1,222	3.5%	1,460	3.7%	1,412	5.6%	1,327	7.1%	1,022	6.6%
Itelmens	801	3.2%	900	3.3%	970	3.1%	1,002	2.9%	1,179	3.0%	1,181	4.7%	948	5.1%	878	5.6%
Evens	714	2.8%	520	1.9%	613	2.0%	476	1.4%	713	1.8%	751	3.0%	743	4.0%	573	3.7%
Russians	13,794	54.8%	16,674	60.6%	19,522	63.1%	22,493	64.5%	24,773	62.0%	12,719	50.6%	8,669	46.2%	6,728	43.1%
Ukrainians	847	3.4%	1,310	4.8%	1,186	3.8%	1,999	5.7%	2,896	7.3%	1,029	4.1%	474	2.5%	209	1.3%
Others	882	3.5%	2,049	7.4%	1,569	5.1%	1,999	5.7%	2,347	5.9%	1,355	5.4%	922	4.9%	976	6.3%
Total	25,160		27,525		30,917		34,850		39,940		25,157		18,759		15,601	

== Governors ==
No.	Image	Governor	Tenure	Time in office	Party	Election
1		Sergey Lyoushkin (1950–2008)	16 November 1991 – 17 November 1996 (lost election)	5 years, 1 day	Independent	Appointed
2		Valentina Bronevich (born 1956)	17 November 1996 – 16 December 2000 (lost re-election)	4 years, 29 days	Independent	1996
3		Vladimir Loginov (1956–2016)	16 December 2000 – 9 March 2005 (removed)	4 years, 83 days	Independent	2000; 2004
–		Oleg Kozhemyako (born 1962)	9 March 2005 – 15 April 2005	2 years, 114 days	United Russia	Acting
4		Oleg Kozhemyako (born 1962)	15 April 2005 – 1 July 2007 (position abolished)	2 years, 114 days	United Russia	2005

== Districts ==
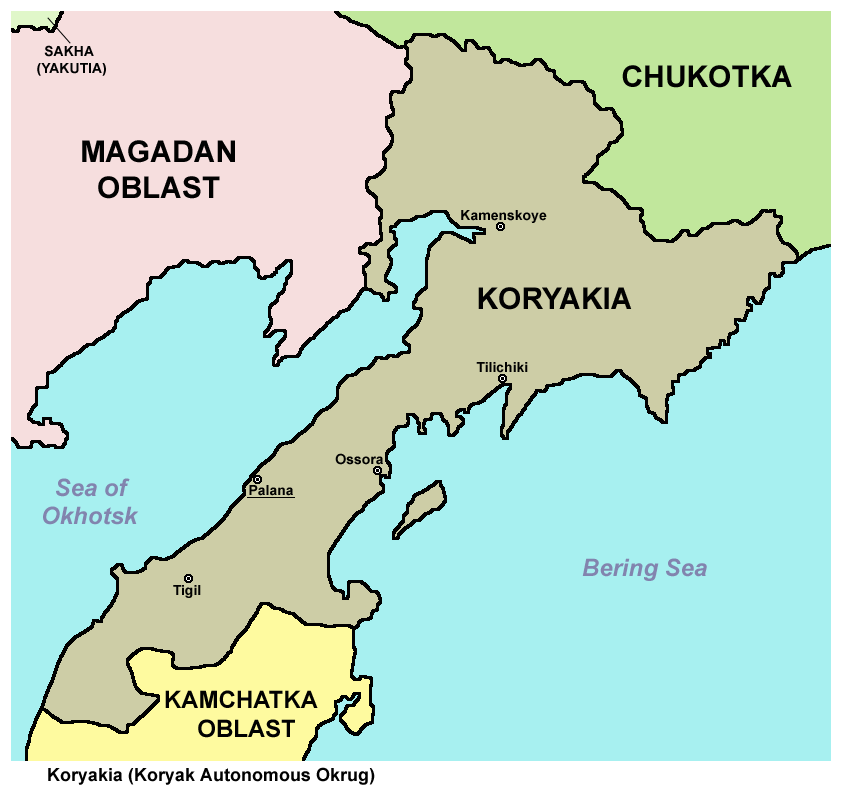
Map of Koryakia

- Karaginsky District
- Olyutorsky District
- Penzhinsky District
- Tigilsky District

== See also ==
- Machevna Bay
