= Flight 251 =

Flight 251 may refer to:

- Faucett Flight 251, a Boeing 737 that crashed on 29 February 1996 in Arequipa, Peru, killing all 129 people on board
- Petropavlovsk-Kamchatsky Air Flight 251 (2012), an Antonov An-28 that crashed on 12 September 2012 in Palana, Russia, killing 10 of the 14 people on board
- Petropavlovsk-Kamchatsky Air Flight 251 (2021), an Antonov An-26 that crashed on 6 July 2021 in Palana, Russia, killing all 28 people on board
