= Petropavlovsk-Kamchatsky Air Flight 251 =

Petropavlovsk-Kamchatsky Air Flight 251 may refer to:

- Petropavlovsk-Kamchatsky Air Flight 251 (2012), aircraft accident in September 2012
- Petropavlovsk-Kamchatsky Air Flight 251 (2021), aircraft accident in July 2021
