= Palana Airport =

Airport in Russia

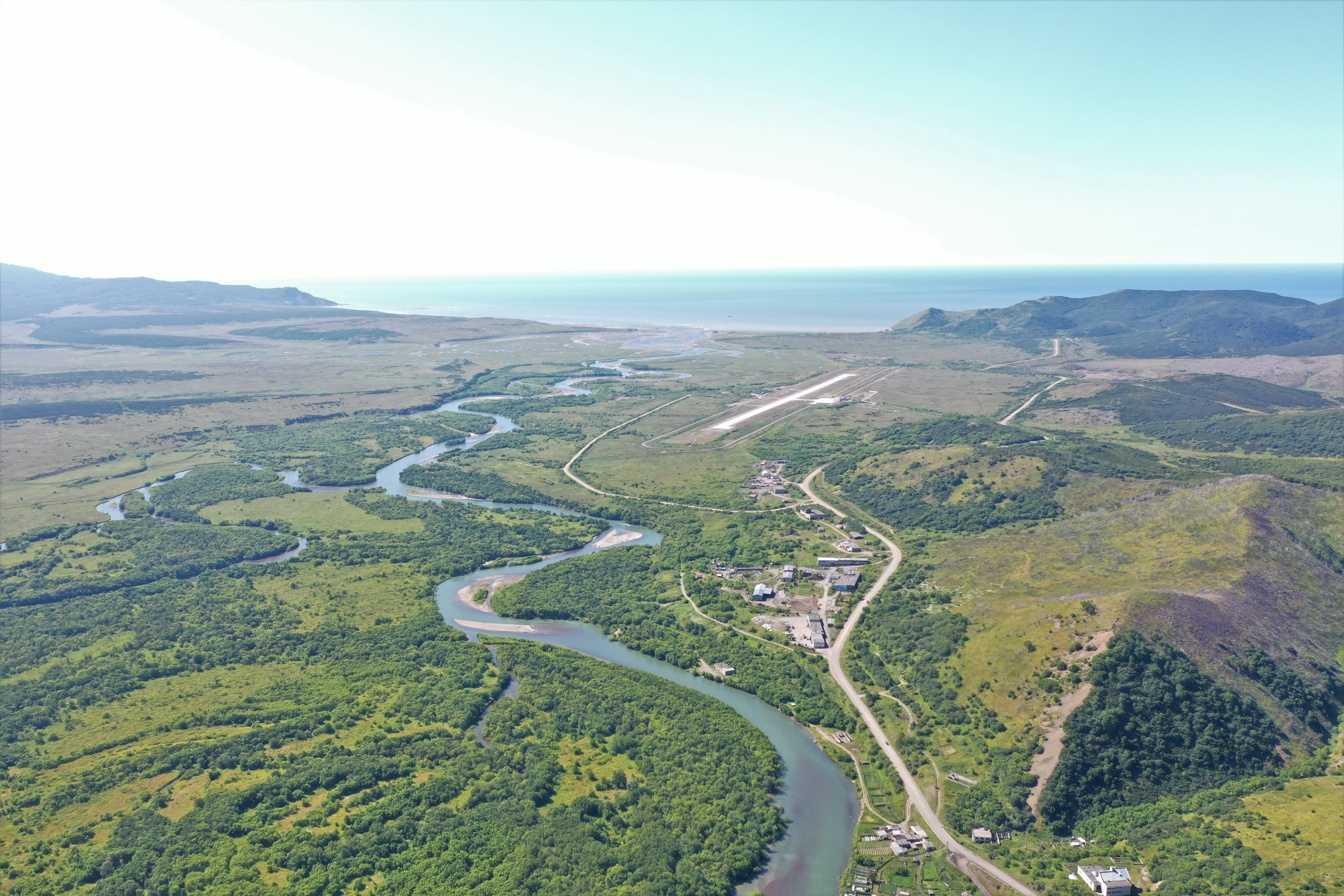
- IATA: none; ICAO: UHPL; LID: ПАН

Summary
- Airport type: Public
- Location: Palana
- Elevation AMSL: 112 ft / 34 m
- Coordinates: 59°4′54″N 159°53′18″E
- Interactive map of Palana Airport

Runways
Direction	Length		Surface
Direction	ft	m	Surface
12/30	4,724	1,440	Asphalt

Palana Airport (Russian: Аэропорт Палана) (ICAO: UHPL) is an airport in Kamchatka Krai, Russia located 4 km west of Palana. It services small transports.

== Airlines and destinations ==
Airlines	Destinations
Petropavlovsk-Kamchatsky Air Enterprise	Petropavlovsk-Kamchatsky

== Incidents and accidents ==
- On 12 September 2012, an An-28 operated by Petropavlovsk-Kamchatsky Air Enterprise as Flight 251 crashed whilst on a domestic flight from Petropavlovsk-Kamchatsky to Palana Airport, killing ten of the fourteen people on board.
- On July 6, 2021, an An-26 of Petropavlovsk-Kamchatsky Air Enterprise, also operating as Flight 251, crashed on approach to Palana Airport into a steep coastal cliff, killing all 28 occupants.

== See also ==
- List of airports in Russia
