= Tilichiki Airport =

Airport in Tilichiki, Russia

- IATA: none; ICAO: UHPT; LID: ТИЛ

Summary
- Airport type: Public
- Location: Tilichiki
- Elevation AMSL: 7 ft / 2 m
- Coordinates: 60°23′0″N 166°1′30″E
- Interactive map of Tilichiki Airport

Runways
Direction	Length		Surface
Direction	ft	m	Surface
02/20	4,528	1,380	Asphalt

Tilichiki Airport (also Korf Airport) (ICAO: UHPT) is an airport in Kamchatka Krai, Russia located 5 km south of Tilichiki. It services small transport aircraft and is located on a sand islet.

== Airlines and destinations ==
Airlines	Destinations
Petropavlovsk-Kamchatsky Air Enterprise	Petropavlovsk-Kamchatsky

== See also ==
- List of airports in Russia
