= Ust-Kamchatsk Airport =

- IATA: none; ICAO: UHPK; LID: УКЧ

Summary
- Airport type: Public
- Location: Ust-Kamchatsk
- Elevation AMSL: 200 ft / 61 m
- Coordinates: 56°14′18″N 162°41′18″E
- Interactive map of Ust-Kamchatsk Airport

Runways
Direction	Length		Surface
Direction	ft	m	Surface
01/19	5,659	1,725	Asphalt

Ust-Kamchatsk Airport (ICAO: UHPK) is an airport in Kamchatka Krai, Russia located ten kilometers east of Ust-Kamchatsk. It is a medium-sized airfield handling small transport planes. The taxiway and apron configurations suggest possible military use in past, though the substandard runway length suggests it is not of significant military importance.

== Airlines and destinations ==
Airlines	Destinations
Petropavlovsk-Kamchatsky Air Enterprise	Petropavlovsk-Kamchatsky

== See also ==
- List of airports in Russia
