= Petropavlovsk-Kamchatsky Air Flight 251 (2021) =

2021 airplane crash in Russia

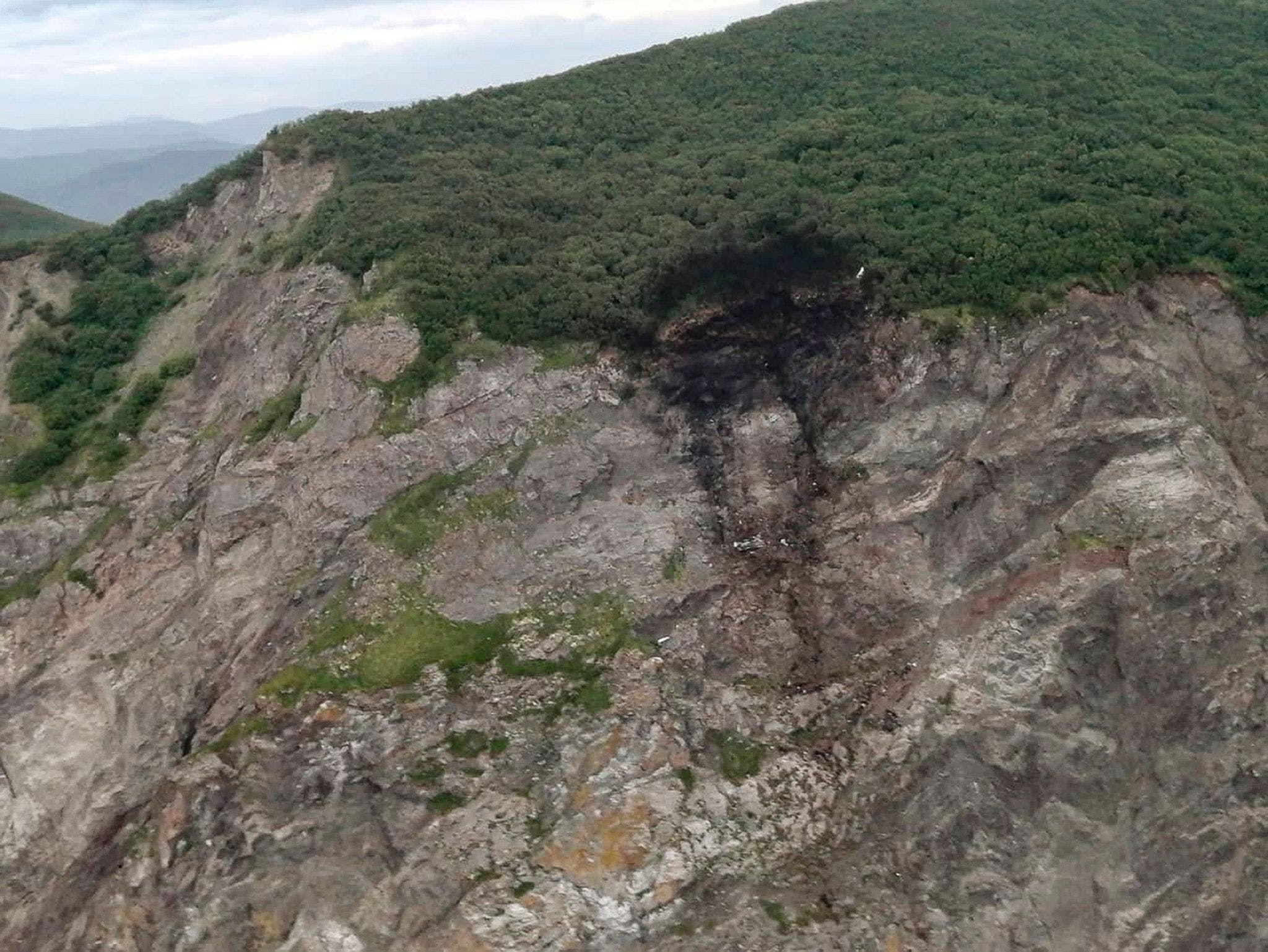
- The crash site on the day of the accident

Accident
- Date: 6 July 2021
- Summary: Controlled flight into terrain due to pilot error
- Site: Near Palana Airport, Palana, Kamchatka Krai, Russia; 59°06′29″N 159°50′48″E

Aircraft
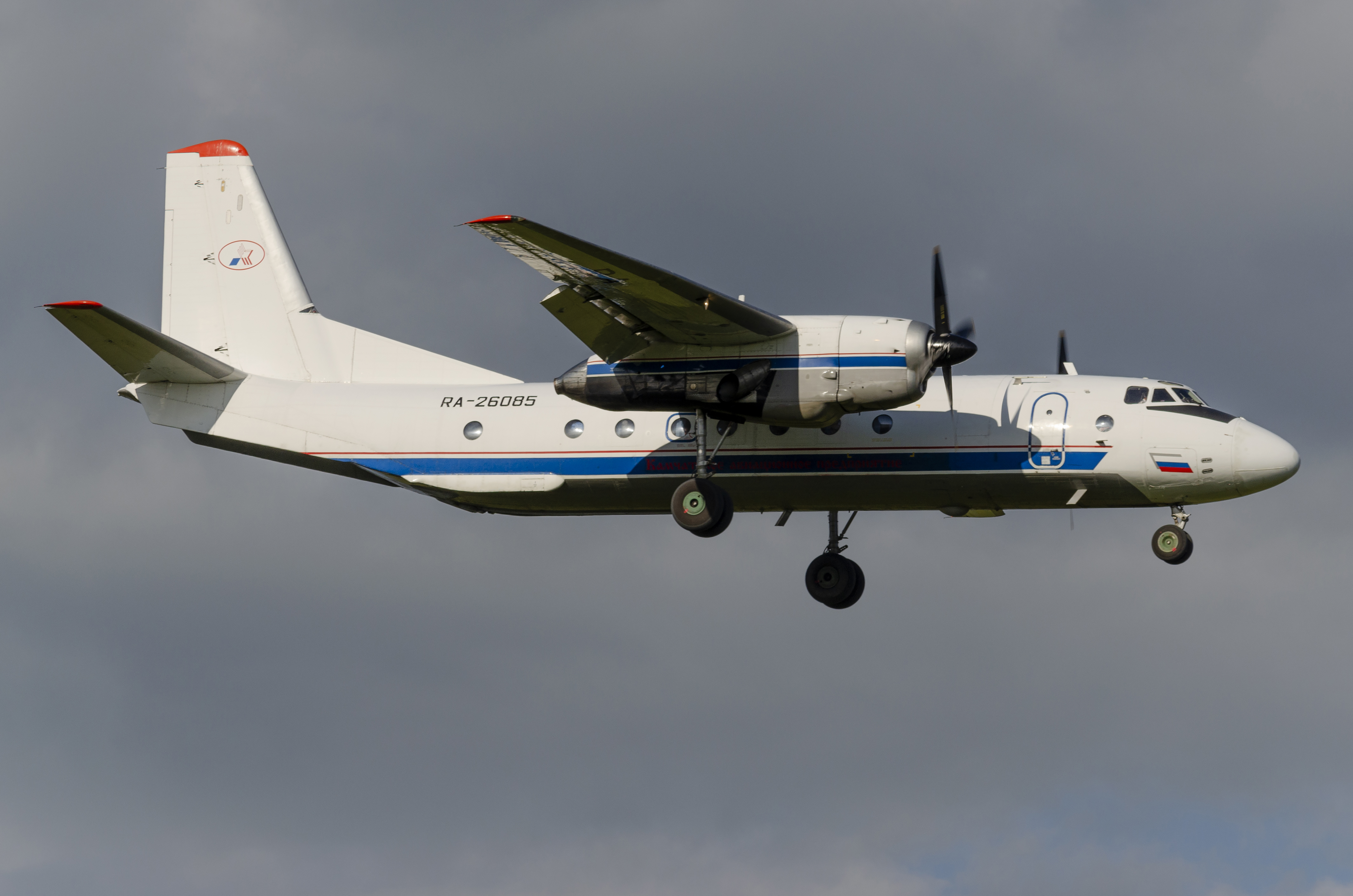
- RA-26085, the Antonov An-26 involved in the crash, in 2020
- Aircraft type: Antonov An-26B-100
- Operator: Petropavlovsk-Kamchatsky Air Enterprise
- ICAO flight No.: PTK251
- Call sign: PETROKAM 251
- Registration: RA-26085
- Flight origin: Elizovo Airport, Petropavlovsk-Kamchatsky, Russia
- Destination: Palana Airport, Palana, Russia
- Occupants: 28
- Passengers: 22
- Crew: 6
- Fatalities: 28
- Survivors: 0

Petropavlovsk-Kamchatsky Air Flight 251 (PTK251) was a domestic Russian scheduled passenger flight from Petropavlovsk-Kamchatsky to Palana, both in Kamchatka Krai in the Russian Far East. On 6 July 2021, the Antonov An-26 serving the flight crashed on approach to Palana, killing all 28 passengers and crew on board.

== Background ==
=== Aircraft ===
The accident aircraft was an Antonov An-26B-100, registration RA-26085, msn 12310, belonging to Kamchatka Air Enterprise. It was built and first flew as an An-26B in 1982.

The An-26 is a family of military transport aircraft; however, the aircraft involved, RA-26085, was a version that an October 2012 overhaul had converted to civilian use for transporting passengers and cargo. It is a twin-engined turboprop powered by two Ivchenko AI-24VT engines.

The aircraft had previously operated with PermTransAvia and Air Mali International, and was also leased for United Nations use. The aircraft had been operated by Petropavlovsk-Kamchatsky Air Enterprise since 2013. It made an average of about nine flights a week, with each flight about two hours.

=== Crew ===
The aircraft had six crew, including captain, first officer, navigator and flight engineer. In 2012, an Antonov An-28 assigned to the same flight route and number also crashed while on its approach to land at Palana Airport.

== Accident ==
Flight 251 was a domestic scheduled passenger flight from Elizovo Airport, Petropavlovsk-Kamchatsky to Palana Airport, Palana, Russia. The flight departed from Petropavlovsk-Kamchatsky at 12:56 local time (00:56 UTC) and was due to land at Palana at 15:05 local time (03:05 UTC). The aircraft passed safely through the area control centers and at 14:09 was transferred to the ATC of Tigilsky District, where the captain contacted Palana for information on weather conditions. Transcripts of the conversations between the Palana airport controller and the pilot reveal that the controller informed the flight that cloud base at the airport was at 720 metres (2,400 ft). The airline's rules prohibited visual approaches to the airport from the sea side when cloud ceilings were lower than 750 metres (2,500 ft), so the controller suggested that the flight approach the airport from the land side using the available navigation beacons. The pilot rejected that suggestion, stating that there was no published approach from the land side and that he would proceed with a visual approach from the sea. The controller again reminded the pilot that the sea approach was not recommended, due to the thickening fog around the airport, that was partially covering the mountains between the Sea of Okhotsk and the airport. The last contact with the aircraft was at 14:48 local time (02:48 UTC), when the crew reported their altitude as 800 m.

The aircraft was on final approach for landing when contact was lost about 10 km (6.2 mi) away from Palana's airport. No go-around was reported by ATC. The weather in the area was cloudy. The aircraft reportedly collided with a steep cliff with a maximum elevation of 263 metres (863 ft). When it collided with the cliff, it was at an altitude of 200 metres (660 ft), below the minimum height for the approach, and was outside of the proper approach path. Upon impact, the aircraft was completely destroyed. Only a portion of the plane's tail remained on the cliff after the impact; the rest of the debris slid down the cliff and into the Sea of Okhotsk, leaving only a skid mark on the cliff to indicate where the accident had taken place.

== Response ==
The crash site was found on the same day, after the Russian Ministry of Emergency Situations had dispatched a Mil Mi-8 helicopter and deployed search teams on the ground. A weak signal was received from an emergency locator transmitter (ELT). Wreckage was sighted at 21:00 local time (09:00 UTC). The aircraft debris were fragmented. A fuselage fragment was found on the slope of the Pyatibratka hill and another fragment was located in the sea, 4 km (2.5 mi) from the coast. All 28 people on board died.

By 7 July the bodies of 19 victims had been recovered by a team of 51 rescue workers. Due to the geographic features of the landscape, the search and rescue operations were deemed difficult. High waves forced rescuers to suspend operations in the sea during the night. A three-day mourning period was declared in the region. Several countries expressed condolences, including the United States, Greece, Turkey, Serbia and Pakistan.

== Investigation ==
The Interstate Aviation Committee is responsible for investigating aviation accidents in Russia. The Investigative Committee of Russia proposed three possible causes of the crash, namely inclement weather, technical failure, or pilot error. On 9 July, the aircraft's flight data recorder (FDR) was found. A spokesman said that "no critical damage" was found during a cursory investigation and that it would be decoded in Moscow. The cockpit voice recorder was recovered the same day, but was too badly damaged, with only fragments of the case being found, and its data could not be retrieved.

On 17 July, Rosaviatsia (the Federal Air Transport Agency), released their first analysis of the FDR. After the aircraft had reached the Palana non-directional beacon (NDB), crossing at an altitude of 800 metres (2,600 ft), it then turned outbound from the NDB with the intention of visually circling back for the final approach to the airport. The air traffic controller told the crew they were on a bearing of 340 degrees (north-northwesterly rather than the west-northwest 289 bearing instructed by the NDB procedure). After communication with the air traffic controller the crew reported they were descending to 600 metres (2,000 ft), but did not confirm if they reached that altitude and did not ask for any further descent. The crew flew the base and final turns, and the FDR did not record any lowering of the landing gear or flaps. The aircraft rolled out of the final turn about 12 kilometres (7.5 miles) from the airport, on a heading of 140 degrees (roughly southeast), heading directly towards the airport. A minute before hitting terrain, the controller informed them they were on a bearing of 320 degrees and about 9 kilometres (5.6 miles) from the aerodrome. The terrain at the point of impact is about 260 metres (850 feet) high, on a coastal cliff topped with trees (tree height 10 metres (33 feet)).

Rosaviatsia recommended, amongst other incidents, that the crash of RA-28715 in 2012 (that also attempted to land at Palana) should be reviewed, to assess the implementation of recommendations for flight safety which had arisen from that accident.

=== Final Report ===
The final report of the accident was released sometime in 2025 by the Interstate Aviation Committee (IAC). The investigation revealed that the crew hadn't discussed their altitude with themselves and had failed to monitor the altitude and their sink rate before impact. The accident was classified as a controlled flight into terrain incident and including ways to counter a failure in CFM and flying into terrain.
