= Ossora Airport =

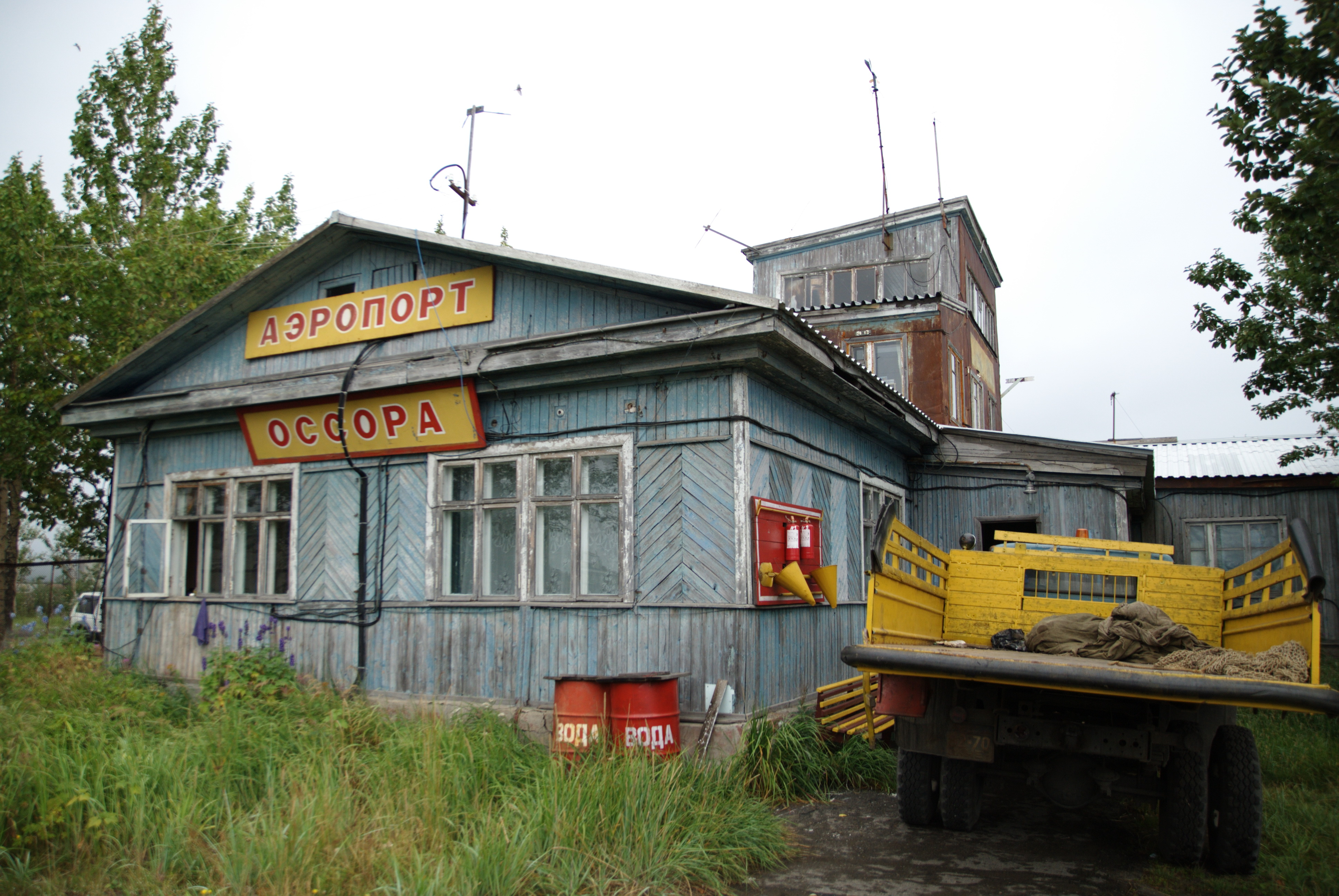
- Ossora Airport, 2010
- IATA: none; ICAO: UHPD; LID: ОСО

Summary
- Airport type: Public
- Serves: Ossora
- Elevation AMSL: 19 ft / 6 m
- Coordinates: 59°13′25″N 163°04′13″E
- Interactive map of Ossora Airport

Runways
Direction	Length		Surface
Direction	ft	m	Surface
02/20	5,217	1,590	Dirt

Ossora Airport (Russian: Оссора аэропорт) is a Public commercial airport located in an Ossora, Koryak Okrug of Kamchatka Krai, Russia.

== Airlines and destinations ==
=== Passenger ===
Airlines	Destinations
Petropavlovsk-Kamchatsky Air Enterprise	Petropavlovsk-Kamchatsky

== See also ==
- List of airports in Russia
- Transport in Russia
