= Nikolskoye Airport =

Russian airport

- IATA: none; ICAO: UHPX

Summary
- Airport type: Public
- Operator: Petropavlovsk-Kamchatsky Air Enterprise
- Location: Nikolskoye, Kamchatka Krai
- Elevation AMSL: 49 ft / 15 m
- Coordinates: 55°10′42″N 166°2′54″E
- Interactive map of Nikolskoye Airport

Runways
Direction	Length		Surface
Direction	ft	m	Surface
03/21	2,953	900	Concrete

Nikolskoye Airport (Russian: Аэропорт Никольское) (ICAO: UHPX) is an airport on Bering Island, Russia located four kilometers southeast of Nikolskoye, Kamchatka Krai. It is the only airfield on the Commander Islands. The airport has no significant military use.

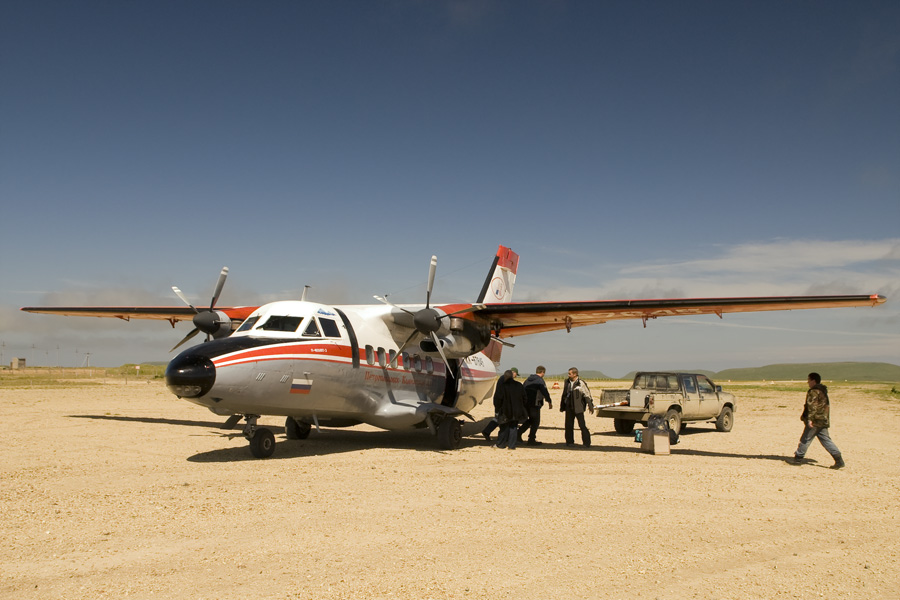
Nikolskoye Airport. Bering Island.

== Airlines and destinations ==
Airlines	Destinations
Petropavlovsk-Kamchatsky Air Enterprise	Petropavlovsk-Kamchatsky

== See also ==
- List of airports in Russia
