= List of shipwrecks in 1767 =

The List of shipwrecks in 1767 includes some ships sunk, wrecked or otherwise lost during 1767.

table of contents
1767
Jan	Feb	Mar	Apr
May	Jun	Jul	Aug
Sep	Oct	Nov	Dec
Unknown date

== January ==
=== 2 January ===
List of shipwrecks: 2 January 1767
Ship	State	Description
Peggy	Great Britain	The ship departed from Great Yarmouth for Rotterdam, Dutch Republic. No further trace, presumed foundered with the loss of all hands.
Shepherd and Shepherdess	Great Britain	The ship foundered in the North Sea off Lindisfarne, Northumberland. She was on a voyage from Southampton, Hampshire to Leith, Lothian.

=== 3 January ===
List of shipwrecks: 3 January 1767
Ship	State	Description
Betsey	Great Britain	The ship foundered in the North Sea off the mouth of the Humber with the loss of 26 lives.

=== 4 January ===
List of shipwrecks: 4 January 1767
Ship	State	Description
Risingham	Great Britain	The ship was driven ashore at Chappel Tunnel, Lincolnshire. She was on a voyage from Memel, Prussia to Newcastle upon Tyne, Northumberland.

=== 8 January ===
List of shipwrecks: 4 January 1767
Ship	State	Description
Svyatoy Pavel (Святой Павел, 'St. Paul')	Imperial Russian Navy	The galiot was driven ashore and wrecked at Shiashkotan, Kuril Islands with the loss of 30 of her 43 crew.

=== 12 January ===
List of shipwrecks: 12 January 1767
Ship	State	Description
Sally	Ireland	The ship was wrecked on the North Bull, in the Irish Sea off County Dublin. Her crew were rescued. She was on a voyage from Dublin to Jamaica.

=== 13 January ===
List of shipwrecks: 13 January 1767
Ship	State	Description
Buxton	Great Britain	The ship was driven ashore and wrecked at Cádiz, Spain.
Devonshire	Great Britain	The ship ran aground in the River Thames at Limehouse, Middlesex. She was on a voyage from London to Naples, Kingdom of Sicily.

=== 16 January ===
List of shipwrecks: 16 January 1767
Ship	State	Description
Friendship	Dutch Republic	The ship ran aground on the Goodwin Sands, Kent, Great Britain. Her crew were rescued. She was later refloated and taken in to Ramsgate, Kent. Friendship was on a voyage from Ostend to Livorno, Grand Duchy of Tuscany.

=== 31 January ===
List of shipwrecks: 31 January 1767
Ship	State	Description
Sampson	Great Britain	The ship foundered in the Irish Sea off Holyhead, Anglesey with the loss of eleven lives. She was on a voyage from the Granades to Liverpool, Lancashire.

=== Unknown date ===
List of shipwrecks: Unknown date 1767
Ship	State	Description
Adventure	Great Britain	The ship foundered in the Bay of Biscay off Bordeaux, France.
Adventure	Great Britain	The ship was driven ashore on the coast of Norfolk. She was on a voyage from King's Lynn, Norfolk to Newcastle upon Tyne, Northumberland.
Charles	Great Britain	The ship was driven ashore and wrecked on the French coast. She was on a voyage from King's Lynn to Liverpool, Lancashire.
Constant John	Great Britain	The ship was lost near Scarborough, Yorkshire. She was on a voyage from South Shields, County Durham to London.
Delight	Great Britain	The ship was driven ashore at Belfast, Ireland. She was on a voyage from the Granades to Liverpool.
Dispatch	Great Britain	The ship was driven ashore and wrecked at Burlington, Yorkshire. She was on a voyage from London to Dundee, Perthshire.
Headley	Great Britain	The ship foundered in Burlington Bay with the loss of all hands. She was on a voyage from Sunderland, County Durham to London.
Henry	Great Britain	The ship was driven ashore and wrecked at the "Back of the Piles", Dublin with the loss of all but three of her crew.
Inman	Great Britain	The ship foundered in Burlington Bay. She was on a voyage from South Shields to London.
John and Sarah	Great Britain	The ship foundered in Burlington Bay with the loss of a crew member. She was on a voyage from Newcastle upon Tyne to Dunkirk, France.
Joseph & Martha	Great Britain	The ship was lost near Trondheim, Norway.
Loretta	Great Britain	The ship was driven ashore near Cherbourg, France. She was on a voyage from London to Africa.
Marquis of Grandby	Great Britain	The ship was driven ashore at Whitehaven, Cumberland. She was on a voyage from Lancaster, Lancashire to Africa.
Pennington	Great Britain	The ship departed from Tinmouth, County Durham for Liverpool. No further trace, presumed foundered with the loss of all hands.
Sevilliano	Spain	The ship foundered. Her crew were rescued by a Dutch vessel. She was on a voyage from Seville to London.
Taverner	Great Britain	The ship was driven ashore on the coast of Lincolnshire.
Theodosia	Great Britain	The ship was driven ashore at Blakeney, Norfolk.
Yarmouth	Great Britain	The ship was driven ashore near Orfordness, Suffolk. She was on a voyage from London to Great Yarmouth, Norfolk.

== February ==
=== 19 February ===
List of shipwrecks: 19 February 1767
Ship	State	Description
Hope	(Kingdom of Great Britain) Guernsey	The ship was driven ashore near Penzance, Cornwall. She was on a voyage from La Rochelle, France to Guernsey.

=== 21 February ===
List of shipwrecks: 21 February 1767
Ship	State	Description
Lloyd	Great Britain	The ship was driven ashore and wrecked at Plymouth, Devon.

=== 26 February ===
List of shipwrecks: 26 February 1767
Ship	State	Description
Four Friends	Great Britain	The ship was driven ashore wrecked on the Scott, in south Wales. She was on a voyage from Lisbon, Portugal to London.
James	Great Britain	The ship was driven ashore and wrecked on the south coast of the Isle of Wight with the loss of four of her crew. She was on a voyage from St. Lucar, Spain to London.
Peggy	Great Britain	The ship was driven ashore and wrecked near Portland Bill, Dorset with the loss of all but one of her crew. She was on a voyage from Rhode Island, British America to London.

=== 27 February ===
List of shipwrecks: 27 February 1767
Ship	State	Description
Lord Clive	British East India Company	The East Indiaman was driven ashore 2 nautical miles (3.7 km) west of Boulogne, France with the loss of three of her crew. She was on a voyage from London to the East Indies.

=== Unknown date ===
List of shipwrecks: Unknown date 1767
Ship	State	Description
Collin	Great Britain	The ship was wrecked on the French coast. She was on a voyage from Messina, Kingdom of Sicily to Hamburg.
Hope and Speedwell	Ireland	The ship foundered in the Bay of Biscay. She was on a voyage from Dublin to the Charente.
King George	Ireland	The ship sank in the River Foyle. She was on a voyage from Philadelphia, Pennsylvania, British America to Londonderry.
Phoenix	Great Britain	The ship was driven ashore and wrecked at Algeciras, Spain.
Prince of Piedmont	Great Britain	The ship was driven ashore at New Romney, Kent. She was on a voyage from London to Vila Franca do Campo, Azores.
Providence	Great Britain	The ship was wrecked on the Black Middens, in the North Sea off the coast of County Durham. She was on a voyage from King's Lynn, Norfolk to Newcastle upon Tyne, Northumberland.
Tryall	Great Britain	The ship was driven ashore near Calais, France. She was on a voyage from North Carolina, British America to London.

== March ==
=== 21 March ===
List of shipwrecks: 21 March 1767
Ship	State	Description
Hanover	Great Britain	The ship was lost near Newcastle upon Tyne, Northumberland with the loss of all but one of her crew.

=== 28 March ===
List of shipwrecks: 28 March 1767
Ship	State	Description
Brudnell	Great Britain	The ship was driven ashore and wrecked near Swanage, Dorset.

=== Unknown date ===
List of shipwrecks: Unknown date 1767
Ship	State	Description
Africa	Great Britain	The ship was driven ashore at Pool, Dorset. She was later refloated and taken in to Pool.
Ann	Great Britain	The ship was lost near Hull, Yorkshire. She was on a voyage from Alnmouth, Northumberland to London.
Bella	Great Britain	The ship was driven ashore near Hoylake, Cheshire. She was on a voyage from Liverpool, Lancashire to Dublin, Ireland
Charming Sally	Great Britain	The ship was driven ashore and wrecked on the Kent coast. She was on a voyage from London to Aberdovey, Merionethshire.
Chase	Great Britain	The collier was driven ashore at Aldeburgh, Suffolk. She was on a voyage from Newcastle upon Tyne, Northumberland, to London.
De Jonge Juffrouw Geertruida Anna	Dutch Republic	The ship wrecked in the bay of Audierne in Brittany, France. Captain Cornelis Wopkes Vos was killed.
Elizabeth	Great Britain	The ship was lost whilst on a voyage from Liverpool to Sligo, Ireland.
Friendship	Great Britain	The ship was driven ashore at Great Yarmouth, Norfolk.
Friendship	Great Britain	The ship was driven ashore at Hoylake. She was on a voyage from Liverpool to Dublin.
Hope	Great Britain	The ship was lost on the coast of Jutland.
John	Great Britain	The galley was driven ashore and wrecked near Boulogne, France.
John & James	Great Britain	The ship foundered in The Swin. She was on a voyage from London to Danzig.
Mary	Great Britain	The ship was driven ashore and severely damaged at Hoylake, Cheshire. She was on a voyage from Jamaica to Liverpool.
Mettam	Great Britain	The ship was wrecked on Skagen, Denmark.
Nonsuch	Great Britain	The ship was driven ashore and wrecked at Hoylake, Cheshire. She was on a voyage from Liverpool to Danzig.
Two Brothers	Great Britain	The ship was driven ashore at North Foreland, Kent. She was on a voyage from Exeter, Devon to London.

== April ==
=== 24 April ===
List of shipwrecks: 24 April 1767
Ship	State	Description
Dove	Great Britain	The ship foundered in the Atlantic Ocean. she was on a voyage from Bahamas to Cape Fear, North Carolina, British America.

=== Unknown date ===
List of shipwrecks: Unknown date 1767
Ship	State	Description
Ann	Great Britain	The ship was driven ashore between Danzig and Pillau, Prussia with the loss of all but one of her crew. She was on a voyage from Newcastle upon Tyne, Northumberland to Danzig.
Catherine & Mary	Ireland	The ship ran aground whilst on a voyage from Cork to Bordeaux, France.
Enterprize	Great Britain	The ship ran aground at Dublin, Ireland. She was on a voyage from London to Dublin.
Sally	Great Britain	The ship was wrecked near St. Lucar, Spain. She was on a voyage from Virginia, British America to Barcelona, Spain.

== May ==
=== 27 May ===
List of shipwrecks: 27 May 1767
Ship	State	Description
Three Friends	Ireland	The ship was wrecked on the south coast of the Isle of Wight, Great Britain. She was on a voyage from Kinsale, County Cork to Hamburg.

=== Unknown date ===
List of shipwrecks: Unknown date 1767
Ship	State	Description
Prince of Wales	Great Britain	The ship foundered in the Baltic Sea. She was on a voyage from Liverpool, Lancashire to Riga, Russia.

== June ==
=== 2 June ===
List of shipwrecks: 2 June 1767
Ship	State	Description
Peggy and Nancy	(Kingdom of Great Britain) British America	The ship capsized in the Atlantic Ocean (23°N 59°W). Nine survivors were later rescued by Trafford (Great Britain).

=== Unknown date ===
List of shipwrecks: Unknown date 1767
Ship	State	Description
British King	Great Britain	The ship capsized at Dublin, Ireland. She was on a voyage from London to Dublin.

== July ==
=== 17 July ===
List of shipwrecks: 17 July 1767
Ship	State	Description
Shannon	Great Britain	The ship foundered in the Atlantic Ocean 20 leagues (60 nautical miles (110 km) east of Martinique. Her crew survived. She was on a voyage from Whitehaven, Cumberland to Antigua.

=== 22 July ===
List of shipwrecks: 22 July 1767
Ship	State	Description
Elizabeth	Great Britain	The ship was driven ashore in Bigbury Bay. Her crew were rescued. She was on a voyage from Saint-Maloes, France to St. Ubes, Portugal.

=== 24 July ===
List of shipwrecks: 24 July 1767
Ship	State	Description
Ellen	Great Britain	The ship sprang a leak and was beached at Hastings, Sussex. She was on a voyage from Cádiz, Spain to London.

=== 27 July ===
List of shipwrecks: 27 July 1767
Ship	State	Description
Nancy	Ireland	The ship was lost on this date. She was on a voyage from Barbados to Dublin.

=== Unknown date ===
List of shipwrecks: Unknown date 1767
Ship	State	Description
Bewdley	Great Britain	The ship was run down and sunk in the Atlantic Ocean off Padstow, Cornwall by a Norwegian vessel. She was on a voyage from London to "Newham".
Felicity	Great Britain	The ship foundered in the Thames Estuary off Sheerness, Kent. Her crew were rescued by Kirbyhall (Great Britain). She was on a voyage from Honfleur, France to London.
Hero	Great Britain	The ship was wrecked on the Dutch coast.

== August ==
=== 1 August ===
List of shipwrecks: 1 August 1767
Ship	State	Description
Prince of Wales	Great Britain	The ship foundered. She was on a voyage from "Mocha" to Calcutta, India.

=== 7 August ===
List of shipwrecks: 7 August 1767
Ship	State	Description
Lovely Betsey	Ireland	The ship sprang a leak and foundered in the Atlantic Ocean. Her passengers and crew took to the boats and were rescued the next day by John and Ann (Great Britain). Lovely Betsey was on a voyage from Cork to Halifax, Nova Scotia, British America.

=== 23 August ===
List of shipwrecks: 23 August 1767
Ship	State	Description
Fortuna	Ireland	The ship ran aground on Ousely Island, Sussex, Great Britain and capsized. Her crew were rescued.

=== 28 August ===
List of shipwrecks: 28 August 1767
Ship	State	Description
Olive Branch	Great Britain	The ship caught fire and sank in the Atlantic Ocean 2 leagues off Penzance, Cornwall. Her crew were rescued.

=== Unknown date ===
List of shipwrecks: Unknown date 1767
Ship	State	Description
Mary	Great Britain	The ship was wrecked at Campbeltown, Argyllshire. She was on a voyage from Saint Kitts to Campbeltown and Londonderry, Ireland.

== September ==
=== 1 September ===
List of shipwrecks: 1 September 1767
Ship	State	Description
Lark	Great Britain	The ship was wrecked on Cape Lopez Gonçalves, Gabon. She was on a voyage from Liverpool, Lancashire to Gabon and Old Calabar.

=== 15 September ===
List of shipwrecks: 15 September 1767
Ship	State	Description
Industry	Great Britain	The ship sprang a leak and was beached in the River Thames. She was on a voyage from London to Seville, Spain.

=== 25 September ===
List of shipwrecks: 25 September 1767
Ship	State	Description
Yelisaveta (Елисавета)	Imperial Russian Navy	The brigantine ran aground at Okhotsk and was severely damaged. She was later refloated and repaired. See also: § 20 October

=== 28 September ===
List of shipwrecks: 28 September 1767
Ship	State	Description
Vrouwe Elisabeth Dorothea	Dutch Republic	The ship of the Dutch East India Company sank between Petten and Callantsoog. Only six people survived.

=== Unknown date ===
List of shipwrecks: Unknown date 1767
Ship	State	Description
Hannah	Great Britain	The ship foundered whilst on a voyage from a Baltic port to Hull, Yorkshire.
Kendall	Great Britain	The ship was driven ashore and wrecked at Dominica.
Rosa	Great Britain	The ship ran aground and was wrecked at Aveiro, Portugal. She was on a voyage from London to Aveiro.
Vier de Vries	Dutch Republic	The ship was wrecked near Kronstadt, Sweden. She was on a voyage from Saint Petersburg, Russia to Amsterdam.

== October ==
=== 1 October ===
List of shipwrecks: 1 October 1767
Ship	State	Description
Lyon	Great Britain	The ship was driven ashore at Montriveil, France. She was on a voyage from Rhode Island, British America to London.

=== 6 October ===
List of shipwrecks: 6 October 1767
Ship	State	Description
Nelly	Great Britain	The ship was driven ashore and wrecked on Rømø, Denmark. She was on a voyage from Gothenburg, Sweden to London.

=== 8 October ===
List of shipwrecks: 8 October 1767
Ship	State	Description
Ross	Great Britain	The ship was wrecked on the Burbo Bank, in Liverpool Bay. Her crew were rescued. She was on a voyage from Liverpool, Lancashire to Newry, County Antrim, Ireland.

=== 13 October ===
List of shipwrecks: 13 October 1767
Ship	State	Description
Jemima	Great Britain	The ship departed from New York for South Carolina, British America. No further trace, presumed foundered in the Atlantic Ocean with the loss of all hands.

=== 20 October ===
List of shipwrecks: 20 October 1767
Ship	State	Description
Yelisaveta (Елисавета)	Imperial Russian Navy	The brigantine capsized and was wrecked at the mouth of the ru:Moroshechnaya, Kamchatka with the loss of sixteen lives. She was on a voyage from Okhotsk to Tigil. See also: § 25 September

=== 26 October ===
List of shipwrecks: 26 October 1767
Ship	State	Description
Neptune	Great Britain	The coaster foundered in the North Sea. Her crew were rescued by two other vessels.

=== Unknown date ===
List of shipwrecks: Unknown date 1767
Ship	State	Description
Alexander and Mary	Sweden	The ship ran aground in the North Sea off Texel, Dutch Republic and was wrecked with the loss of all but one of her crew. She was on a voyage from Stockholm to Colchester, Essex, Great Britain.
Anna Catharina	(Denmark) Norway	The ship foundered in the North Sea off Heligoland. She was on a voyage from Christiana to London, Great Britain.
Charm	Great Britain	The ship foundered in the North Sea off Dunkirk, France. She was on a voyage from Jamaica to London.
David Fitzlaf	Stettin	The ship was driven ashore and wrecked at Stettin.
Elizabeth	Great Britain	The ship was driven ashore and wrecked on the French coast.
Garl of Gebrands and Cias	Sweden	The ship was driven ashore and wrecked at Stettin. She was on a voyage from Wyberg to Stettin
Harmony	Great Britain	The ship foundered in the North Sea off the coast of Caithness.
Jannet	Great Britain	The ship foundered in the North Sea off Texel. She was on a voyage from Portsoy, Aberdeenshire to Livorno, Grand Duchy of Tuscany.
Joseph & Martha	Great Britain	The ship was severely damaged in the North Sea off Domesnes, Norway. Thirteen of her seventeen crew were taken off by another vessel.
Kruger	Prussia	The ship was driven ashore near Waarberg. Sweden. She was on a voyage from London to Volgast.
Liveday	Great Britain	The ship foundered in the North Sea off Heligoland. Eight crewmen were rescued by Sally (Great Britain).
Maria & Catharina	Prussia	The ship was driven ashore near Waarberg. She was on a voyage from London to Königsberg.
Maryland Planter	(Kingdom of Great Britain) British America	The ship foundered in the Atlantic Ocean 300 leagues (900 nautical miles (1,700 km)) west of The Lizard, Cornwall, Great Britain. Her crew were rescued by Sybella (Great Britain). Maryland Planter was on a voyage from Maryland to Newfoundland.
Nelly	Great Britain	The ship foundered in the North Sea.
Peggy	Great Britain	The ship was wrecked on the Carr Rock, in the North Sea off the coast of Berwickshire. Her crew were rescued.
Phenix	Great Britain	The ship was driven ashore at Margate, Kent. She was on a voyage from Limerick, Ireland to London.
Philadelphia	Dutch Republic	The ship foundered in the North Sea off Texel. She was on a voyage from Guinea to Middelburg.
Tweed	Great Britain	The ship was towed in to Berwick upon Tweed in a dismasted state and subsequently sank there. She was on a voyage from Gothenburg, Sweden to Berwick upon Tweed.
Venus	Great Britain	The ship destroyed by an explosion in the River Congo.

== November ==
=== 11 November ===
List of shipwrecks: 11 November 1767
Ship	State	Description
Thomas	Dutch Republic	The ship was driven ashore on Texel. She was on a voyage from Málaga, Spain to Amsterdam.

=== 12 November ===
List of shipwrecks: 12 November 1767
Ship	State	Description
Hannah	Great Britain	The ship foundered in the Atlantic Ocean. Her crew were rescued by Tristam (Great Britain). Hannah was on a voyage from Puerto Rico to Bristol, Gloucestershire.

=== 17 November ===
List of shipwrecks: 17 November 1767
Ship	State	Description
Rebecca	Great Britain	African slave trade: The ship struck a rock in Long Bay, Barbados and was beached. All on board were rescued but she was declared a total loss. Rebecca was on a voyage from Africa to Barbados.

=== 19 November ===
List of shipwrecks: 19 November 1767
Ship	State	Description
Experience	(Kingdom of Great Britain) British America	The schooner was lost off Coffin Island.

=== Unknown date ===
List of shipwrecks: Unknown date 1767
Ship	State	Description
Cornwall	Great Britain	The ship was driven ashore at Kuressaare, Russia. She was on a voyage from London to Saint Petersburg, Russia.
Countiss of Pearce	Great Britain	The ship ran aground in The Swin. She was on a voyage from London to Königsberg, Prussia.
Friendship	Great Britain	The ship was driven ashore at Burry, Glamorgan with the loss of two of her crew. She was on a voyage from Philadelphia, Pennsylvania, British America to Bristol, Gloucestershire.
James & Fanny	Great Britain	The ship was lost whilst on a voyage from Dublin, Ireland to Whitby, Yorkshire.
Jesse	Great Britain	The ship was driven ashore and wrecked at Holyhead, Anglesey. Her crew were rescued. She was on a voyage from Saint Kitts to Liverpool, Lancashire.
Joseph & Martha	Great Britain	The ship was driven ashore and wrecked on the coast of Jutland with the loss of her captain. She was on a voyage from Onega, Russia to Newcastle upon Tyne, Northumberland.
Kitty	Great Britain	The ship was lost near Barcelona, Spain. She was on a voyage from Newfoundland, British America to Barcelona.
Margaret	Great Britain	The ship was driven ashore and wrecked at Salcombe, Devon. Her crew were rescued. She was on a voyage from Bordeaux, France to London.
Margareta	Dutch Republic	The ship was lost in the Orkney Islands, Great Britain. She was on a voyage from Arkhangelsk, Russia to Amsterdam.
Mary	Great Britain	The ship was lost in the Firth of Forth. She was on a voyage from London to Dundee, Perthshire.
Pearl	Sweden	The ship foundered in the English Channel off Dover, Kent, Great Britain with the loss of seven of her crew. She was on a voyage from Stockholm to Dublin.
Roberts	Great Britain	The ship was lost on the Welsh coast. She was on a voyage from Liverpool to Africa.
Sarah	Ireland	The ship foundered in the Atlantic Ocean 60 nautical miles (110 km) west of Cork with the loss of 27 lives. She was on a voyage from Newfoundland to Ireland.
Squirrel	Great Britain	The ship was driven ashore and wrecked at Harlingen, Dutch Republic. She was on a voyage from British Honduras to Amsterdam.
Wilhelmus	Hamburg	The ship was driven ashore and wrecked on the French coast.

== December ==
=== 1 December ===
List of shipwrecks: 1 December 1767
Ship	State	Description
Rump & Dozen	Ireland	The ship departed from Cádiz, Spain for Dublin. No further trace, presumed foundered with the loss of all hands.
Ulrica	Sweden	The ship exploded and sank off Cádiz.

=== 3 December ===
List of shipwrecks: 3 December 1767
Ship	State	Description
Coronation	Great Britain	The ship was driven ashore at Cádiz, Spain.
Adventure	Great Britain	The ship was driven ashore and wrecked at Cádiz.
Eagle	Great Britain	The ship was driven ashore and wrecked at Cádiz.
Elizabeth	Great Britain	The ship was driven ashore and wrecked at Cádiz.
Freemason	Great Britain	The ship was driven ashore at Cádiz.
Gibraltar Packet	Great Britain	The ship was driven ashore at Cádiz.
James	Great Britain	The ship was driven ashore and wrecked at Cádiz.
John	Ireland	The ship was driven ashore and wrecked at Cádiz.
St Peter	Spain	The ship was driven ashore and wrecked at Cádiz.
Susannah	Great Britain	The ship was driven ashore at Cádiz.

=== 4 December ===
List of shipwrecks: 4 December 1767
Ship	State	Description
Maria Blandina	Dutch Republic	The ship was wrecked on the Hoyle Sand, in Liverpool Bay. Her crew survived. She was on a voyage from Liverpool, Lancashire, Great Britain to Ostend.

=== 10 December ===
List of shipwrecks: 10 December 1767
Ship	State	Description
Success	Great Britain	The ship was driven ashore at Cape St. Mary's, near Faro, Portugal. She was on a voyage from Liverpool, Lancashire to Faro.

=== 16 December ===
List of shipwrecks: 16 December 1767
Ship	State	Description
Hampton	Great Britain	The ship was driven ashore at Dunworly, County Cork, Ireland. She was on a voyage from Barbados to Bristol, Gloucestershire.

=== 19 December ===
List of shipwrecks: 19 December 1767
Ship	State	Description
Betsey	Great Britain	The ship was driven ashore and wrecked at Ballyquinton Point, County Down, Ireland. Her crew were rescued. She was on a voyage from liverpool, Lancashire to Waterford, Ireland.
Nelly	Great Britain	The ship was driven ashore on the Isle of Bute. She was on a voyage from Glasgow, Renfrewshire to Dublin, Ireland.

=== 27 December ===
List of shipwrecks: 27 December 1767
Ship	State	Description
Defiance	British East India Company	The East Indiaman was destroyed by an onboard explosion with the loss of over 260 lives. There were 35 survivors. She was on a voyage from Bombay, India to Bassora, Persia.
Peggy	Great Britain	The ship was wrecked on the coast of County Donegal, Ireland. Her crew survived. She was on a voyage from Cape Fare, North Carolina, British America to Hull, Yorkshire.

=== 30 December ===
List of shipwrecks: 30 December 1767
Ship	State	Description
Mercury	Great Britain	The ship was destroyed by fire at St. Mary's, Isles of Scilly. She was on a voyage from Carmarthen to London.

=== Unknown date ===
List of shipwrecks: Unknown date 1767
Ship	State	Description
Adventure	Great Britain	The ship was lost at Dénia, Spain.
Anna Catharina	Dutch Republic	The ship was sighted off Dover in early December. No further trace, presumed foundered with the loss of all hands. She was in a voyage from Harlingen to London, Great Britain.
Blossom	Great Britain	The ship took on a pilot in mid-December to take her in to Liverpool, Lancashire. No further trace, presumed foundered with the loss of all on board.
Charles	Great Britain	The ship foundered in the White Sea. She was on a voyage from Onega, Russia to Cádiz, Spain.
Charming Betty	Great Britain	The ship was run down and sunk by a Dutch vessel. Her crew were rescued. She was on a voyage from London to Norway.
Commerce	Great Britain	The ship was driven ashore on the Swedish coast. She was on a voyage from Narva, Russia to Hull, Yorkshire.
Elenora	Great Britain	The ship was driven ashore on the coast of Lincolnshire. She was on a voyage from Memel, Prussia to London. She was still ashore on 26 January 1768.
Endeavour	Great Britain	The ship was driven ashore at Alicante, Spain. She was later refloated.
Gelukige Desser	Dutch Republic	The ship was lost near Hellevoetsluis. She was on a voyage from "Hookeziel" to London.
Gouldsberry	Great Britain	The ship was driven ashore on the coast of Lincolnshire. She was on a voyage from Gothenburg, Sweden to London. She was refloated and taken in to Hull on 25 January for repairs.
Hope	Sweden	The ship foundered in the North Sea off Great Yarmouth, Norfolk, Great Britain. She was on a voyage from Gothenburg to Marseille, France.
Nancy	Great Britain	The Guineaman ran aground and was wrecked in the River Thames at Ratcliff Cross.
New Castle	Great Britain	The ship was wrecked on the coast of Jutland. She was on a voyage from London to Hamburg.
Three Friends	Great Britain	The ship was lost on "Gottenthrop". She was on a voyage from Glasgow, Renfrewshire to Lancaster, Lancashire.
Trial	Great Britain	The ship was wrecked on the Swedish coast. She was on a voyage from Saint Petersburg, Russia to St. Ives, Cornwall.
Two Sisters	Great Britain	The ship was driven ashore at Alicante.
Tyger	Great Britain	The ship was wrecked on the French coast. Her crew were rescued. She was on a voyage from London to Bristol, Gloucestershire.

== Unknown date ==
List of shipwrecks: Unknown date 1767
Ship	State	Description
Bonetta	Great Britain	The ship was lost in the Atlantic Ocean off the mouth of the River Kissey, Africa.
Britannia	Great Britain	The ship foundered in the Atlantic Ocean off Long Island, New York, British America.
Britannia	Great Britain	The whaler was lost off the coast of Greenland.
Diligence	Great Britain	The ship was driven ashore on Long Island. Her crew were rescued. She was on a voyage from South Carolina, British America to Liverpool, Lancashire.
Duke of York	Great Britain	The ship was lost on the Barbary Coast. She was on a voyage from Senegal to Teneriffe, Canary Islands.
Friendship	Great Britain	The brigantine was wrecked on the Whitford Burrows, in the Bristol Channel with the loss of two of her crew. She was on a voyage from Philadelphia, Pennsylvania, British America to Bristol, Gloucestershire.
General Lawrence	Great Britain	The ship was lost in the East Indies.
Good Intent	Great Britain	The ship foundered off Havana, Captaincy General of Cuba. Her crew were rescued.
Hannah	Great Britain	The ship was listed as missing in December. She was on a voyage from America to Great Britain.
Harrietta	Great Britain	The ship was lost in the Straits of Bahama. She was on a voyage from Jamaica to South Carolina.
Hawke	Great Britain	The ship was wrecked on the coast of Georgia, British America.
Hope	Great Britain	The ship foundered in the Atlantic Ocean. She was on a voyage from South Carolina to London.
Industry	Great Britain	The ship was lost at Senegal.
Industry	Great Britain	The ship foundered in the Atlantic Ocean. Her crew were rescued. She was on a voyage from North Carolina, British America to London.
Jane & Susannah	Great Britain	The ship was lost whilst on a voyage from Morea to Genoa101167/>
Kitty	Great Britain	The ship was lost at Barbados. She was on a voyage from Newfoundland, British America to Barbados.
Little William	Great Britain	The ship was driven ashore and wrecked on the Île d'Orléans, Quebec. She was on a voyage from London to Quebec.
Lovely Betsey	Ireland	The ship foundered in the Atlantic Ocean. She was on a voyage from Newry, County Antrim to Halifax, Nova Scotia, British America.
Margaret and Rebecca	(Kingdom of Great Britain) British America	The ship was driven ashore and wrecked at Cape Henry, Virginia. She was on a voyage from Philadelphia to Dominica.
Mary	Great Britain	The ship was driven ashore south of Charles Town, South Carolina. Her crew survived. She was on a voyage from London to South Carolina.
Moffat	Great Britain	The ship was lost on the Isle of Ashe. She was on a voyage from London to Jamaica.
Muggy	Great Britain	The ship foundered in the Atlantic Ocean. Her crew were rescued by Christian (Great Britain). Muggy was on a voyage from Antigua to New York.
Nancy	Great Britain	The ship was lost in the West Indies.
Nancy	Great Britain	The ship was driven ashore and wrecked on the coast of Africa.
Nelly	Great Britain	The ship was lost at Montserrat.
Neptune	Great Britain	The ship foundered in the Bay of Honduras with the loss of two of her crew.
Norfolk	(Kingdom of Great Britain) British America	The ship foundered in the Atlantic Ocean of Cape Henry, Virginia. She was on a voyage from Montserrat to Virginia.
Royal George	Great Britain	The ship foundered in the Atlantic Ocean off the American coast. Her crew were rescued by a fishing sloop. She was on a voyage from Virginia, British America to London.
Royal Hunter	Great Britain	The ship sank in the Delaware River, British America. She was on a voyage from Barbados to Philadelphia.
Sally	Great Britain	The ship was wrecked on the Hogsty Reef. She was on a voyage from New York, British America to Pensacola, Spanish Florida.
St Anthony	Great Britain	The ship foundered in the Atlantic Ocean. Her crew were rescued. She was on a voyage from South Carolina to Porto, Portugal.
