= Tigil (river) =

Location
- Country: Russia

Physical characteristics
- Mouth: Sea of Okhotsk
  - location: Shelikhov Gulf
  - coordinates: 58°01′30″N 158°12′31″E
- Length: 300 km (190 mi)
- Basin size: 17,800 km^{2} (6,900 sq mi)

The Tigil (Russian: Тигиль) is a river on the western side of the Kamchatka Peninsula. It flows into the Sea of Okhotsk. It is 300 kilometres (190 mi) long, and has a drainage basin of 17,800 square kilometres (6,900 sq mi). The Cossack Luka Semyonovich Morozko, member of Vladimir Atlasov's detachment to Kamchatka, was the first European to reach it in 1696. The village Tigil lies on the river Tigil.
