= Palana (river) =

River in Russia

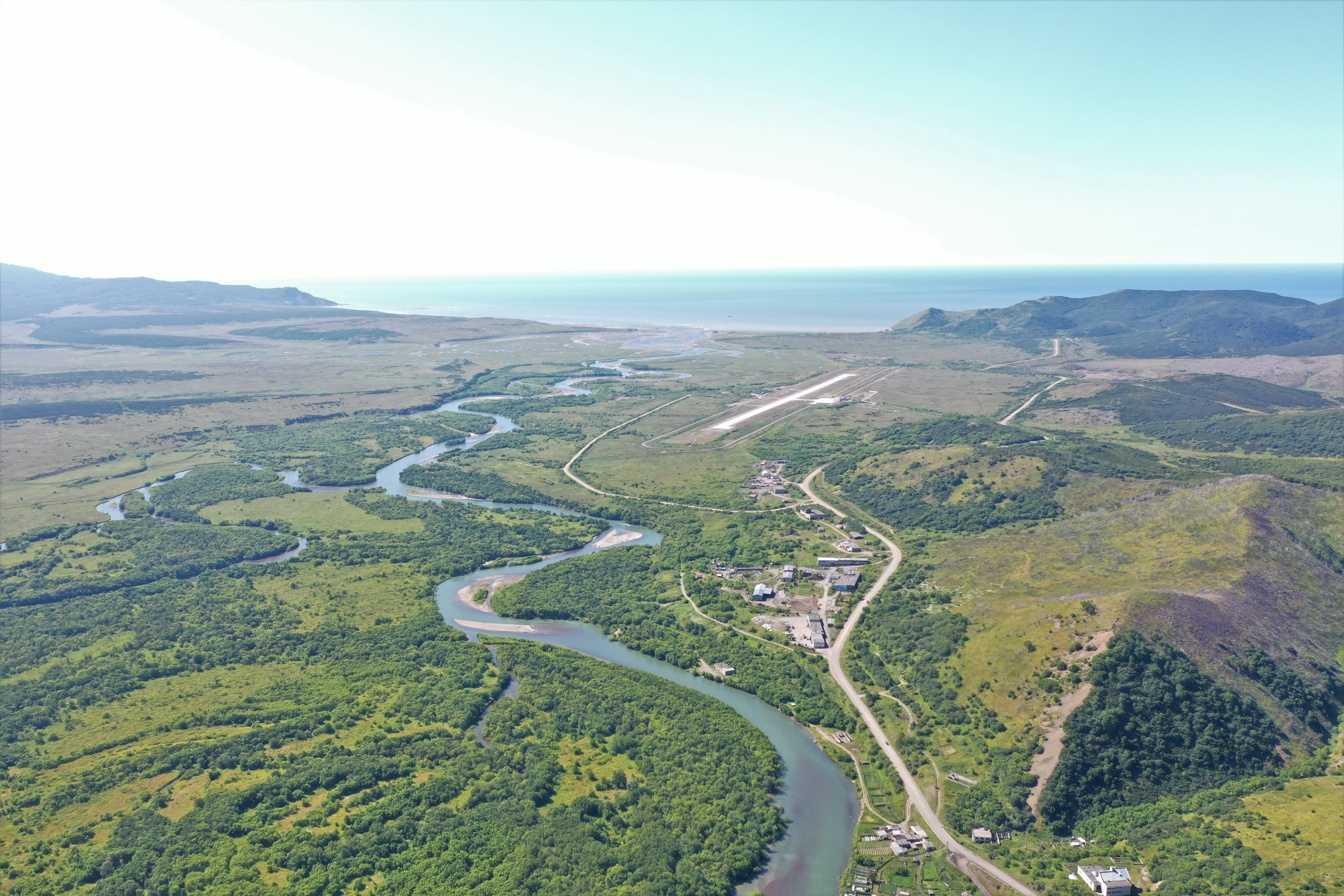
- Aerial view of the Palana River

- Location of mouth

Location
- Country: Russia

Physical characteristics
- Mouth: Sea of Okhotsk
  - location: Shelikhov Gulf
  - coordinates: 59.0699°N 159.8325°E
- Length: 141 km (88 mi)
- Basin size: 2,500 km^{2} (970 sq mi)

The Palana is a west-flowing river on the west side of the upper Kamchatka Peninsula, Russia. It flows into the Sea of Okhotsk. It is 141 kilometres (88 mi) long, and has a drainage basin of 2,500 square kilometres (970 sq mi). The town of Palana lies on its right bank, near its mouth.

Jurassic radiolarians have been found near the mouth of the river.
