= Petropavlovsk-Kamchatsky Air Flight 251 (2012) =

Aviation accident

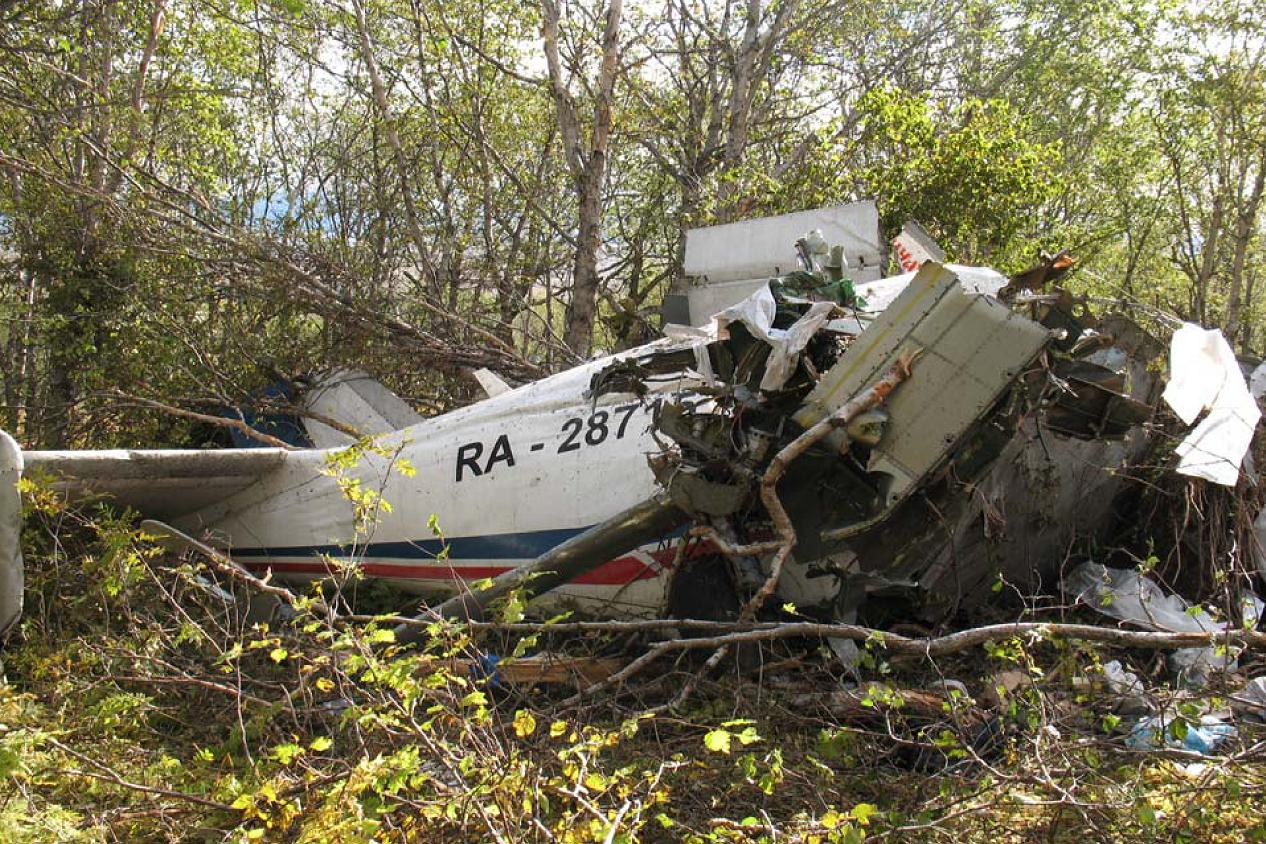
- The wreckage of RA-28715 at the crash site

Accident
- Date: 12 September 2012
- Summary: Controlled flight into terrain due to pilot error.
- Site: Mount Pyatibratka, Russia; 58.9500°N 160.3190°E

Aircraft
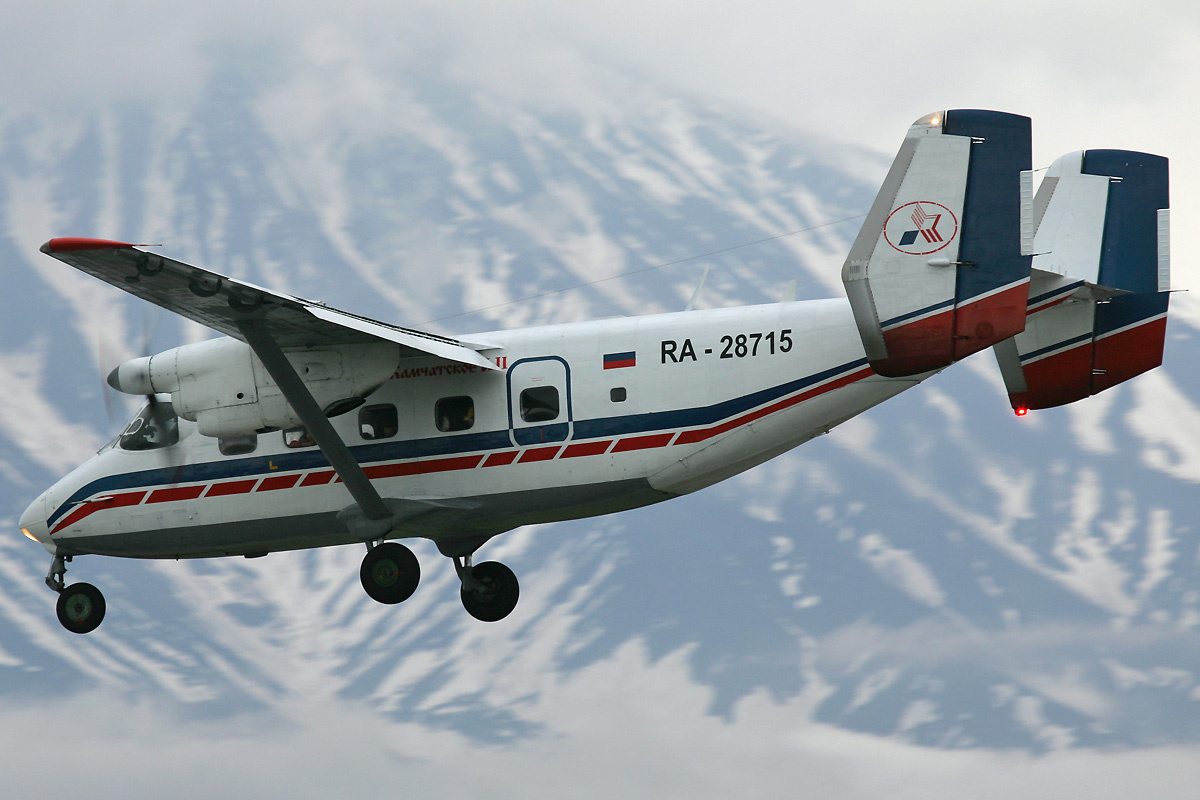
- RA-28715, the aircraft involved, seen in 2011
- Aircraft type: Antonov An-28
- Operator: Petropavlovsk-Kamchatsky Air Enterprise
- ICAO flight No.: PTK251
- Call sign: PETROKAM 251
- Registration: RA-28715
- Flight origin: Petropavlovsk-Kamchatsky Airport, Russia
- Destination: Palana Airport, Russia
- Occupants: 14
- Passengers: 12
- Crew: 2
- Fatalities: 10
- Injuries: 4
- Survivors: 4

On 12 September 2012 at about 12:20 local time (00:20 UTC), Petropavlovsk-Kamchatsky Air Flight 251, operated by an Antonov An-28, crashed while attempting to land at Palana Airport in Russia. Both pilots were killed, together with 8 of the 12 passengers. All 4 survivors were in serious condition. The aircraft descended below minima on approach in instrument meteorological conditions and impacted a forested slope. Alcohol was found in the blood of both flight crew.

On 6 July 2021, an Antonov An-26 assigned to the same flight route and number also crashed while on its approach to land at Palana Airport.

== Aircraft ==
The aircraft was a twin-turboprop Antonov An-28, registration RA-28715, built in 1989 with serial number 1AJ006-25.

== Investigation ==
The Interstate Aviation Committee (MAK) released their final report in February 2013.
