= Tigilsky District =

Tigilsky District Тигильский район (Russian)
- District
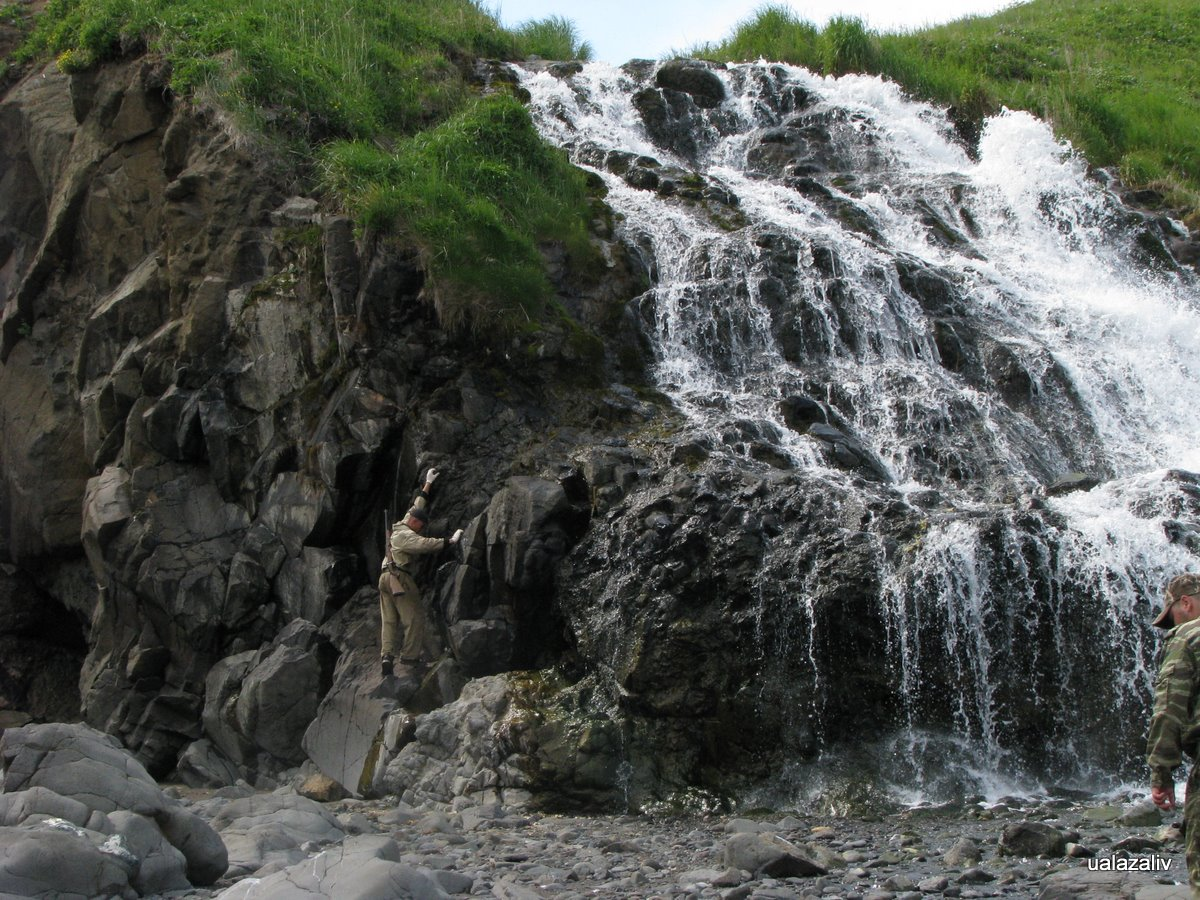
- Waterfall in Tigilsky District

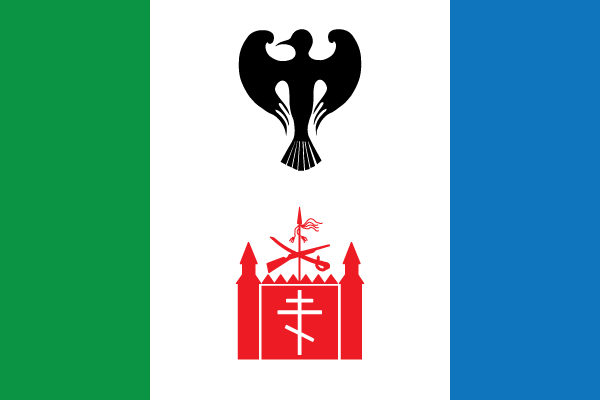
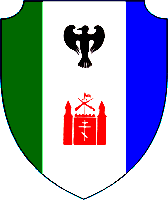
- Flag Coat of arms
- Location of Tigilsky District in Koryak Okrug, Kamchatka Krai
- Coordinates: 57°46′N 158°44′E
- Country: Russia
- Federal subject: Kamchatka Krai
- Established: 1 April 1926
- Administrative center: Tigil

Area
  - Total: 63,484 km^{2} (24,511 sq mi)

Population (2010 Census)
  - Total: 7,307
  - Density: 0.1151/km^{2} (0.2981/sq mi)
  - Urban: 43.2%
  - Rural: 56.8%

Administrative structure
  - Inhabited localities: 1 urban-type settlements, 7 rural localities

Municipal structure
  - Municipally incorporated as: Tigilsky Municipal District
  - Municipal divisions: 0 urban settlements, 7 rural settlements
- Time zone: UTC+12 (MSK+9)
- OKTMO ID: 30832000
- Website: http://tigil.ru/

Tigilsky District (Russian: Тиги́льский райо́н) is an administrative district (raion) of Koryak Okrug of Kamchatka Krai, Russia, one of the eleven in the krai. It is located in the west of the krai. The area of the district is 63,484 square kilometers (24,511 sq mi). Its administrative center is the rural locality (a selo) of Tigil. Population: 7,307 (2010 census); 9,341 (2002 census); 12,452 (1989 Soviet census). The population of Tigil accounts for 23.1% of the district's total population.

Ethnic composition (2021):

- Russians – 36.9%
- Koryaks – 31.5%
- Itelmens – 20.3%
- Kamchadals – 3.6%
- Khakas – 1.5%
- Ukrainians – 1.4%
- Others – 4.8%

== Administrative and municipal status ==
Within the framework of administrative divisions, Tigilsky District is one of the eleven in the krai. The selo of Tigil serves as its administrative center.

As a municipal division, the territory of the district is split between two municipal formations—Tigilsky Municipal District, to which seven of the administrative district's rural localities belong, and Palana Urban Okrug, which covers the rest of the administrative district's territory, including the urban-type settlement of Palana.
