= Ozerny, Republic of Buryatia =

Ozerny Озёрный
- Settlement
- Location within Republic of Buryatia Location within Russia
- Coordinates: 52°55′N 111°41′E
- Country: Russia
- Region: Republic of Buryatia
- District: Yeravninsky District
- Time zone: UTC+8:00

Ozerny (Russian: Озёрный; Buryat: Нуурта, Nuurta) is a rural locality (a settlement) in Yeravninsky District, Republic of Buryatia, Russia. The population was 427 as of 2010. There are 7 streets.

== Geography ==
Ozerny is located 57 km north of Sosnovo-Ozerskoye (the district's administrative centre) by road. Khorga is the nearest rural locality.
