= Tigil =

Selo in Tigilsky District, Kamchatka Krai, Russia

Tigil Тигиль
- Selo

Other transcription(s)
  - Itelmen: Сәмзат, Semzat
- Interactive map of Tigil
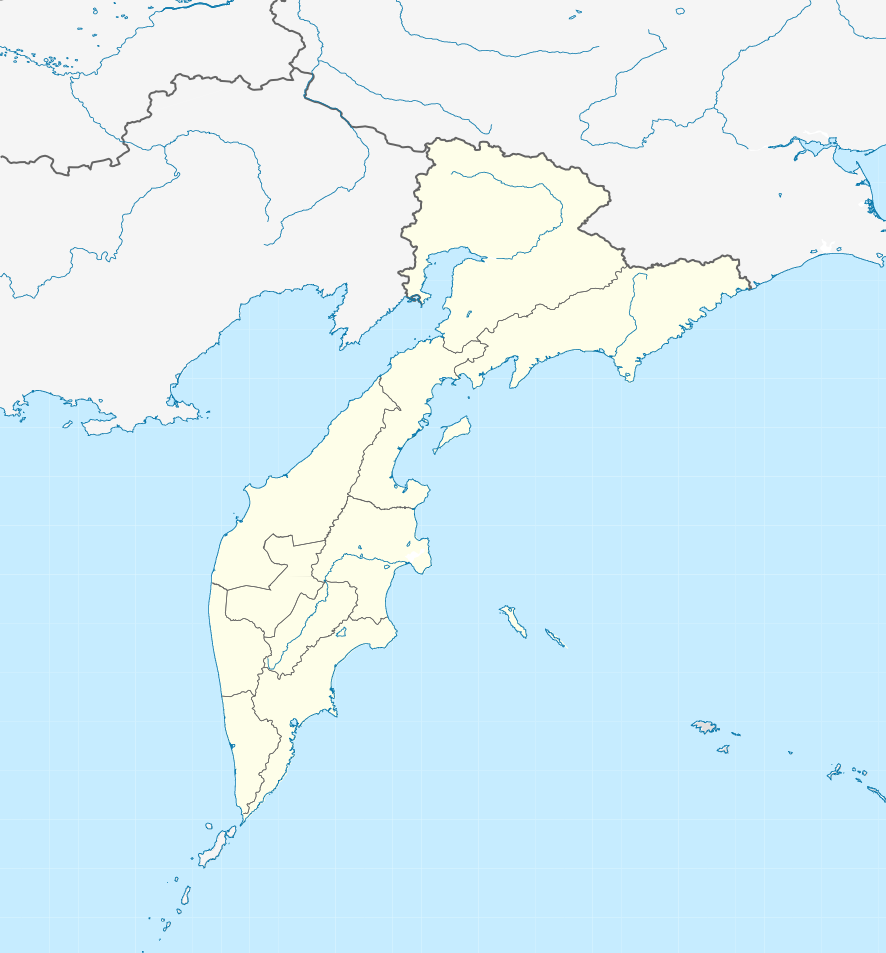
- Location of Tigil Tigil (Kamchatka Krai)
- Coordinates: 57°45′41″N 158°40′32″E
- Country: Russia
- Federal subject: Kamchatka Krai
- Administrative district: Tigilsky District
- Founded: 1747

Population (2010 Census)
  - Total: 1,691
  - Estimate (2021): 1,547 (−8.5%)

Municipal status
  - Capital of: Tigilsky District
- Time zone: UTC+12 (MSK+9)
- Postal code: 688600
- Dialing code: +7 415-37
- OKTMO ID: 30832405101

Tigil (Russian: Тигиль; Itelmen: Сәмзат, Semzat) is a rural locality (a selo) located on the bank of Tigil river, and serves as the administrative center of Tigilsky District of Koryak Okrug of Kamchatka Krai, Russia. Population: 1,547 (2021 census); 1,691 (2010 census); 2,132 (2002 census); 3,233 (1989 Soviet census).

== Geography ==
The village is located in the northwestern part of the Kamchatka Peninsula, on the Tigil River, 48 km from its mouth in the Sea of Okhotsk. The straight-line distance from Tigil to the urban locality of Palana is 165 km (103 mi), and to Petropavlovsk-Kamchatsky is 523 km (325 mi).

== History ==
The Tigil River, upon which the rural locality is situated, has played a significant strategic role in the extensive development of the peninsula, a process that commenced in the 18th century. The primary routes along the western coast of Kamchatka traversed the river. Even prior to the Russian era, the Tigil River served as one of the principal communication pathways connecting northwestern Kamchatka with the central region of the peninsula and its eastern coastline. This situation led to the necessity of constructing a fortress. The initial settlement at the location of the current village emerged in 1747. Between 1751 and 1752, Lieutenant Kholmov established the Tigil Fortress, which underwent several renovations thereafter.

A preserved plan of the fortress from the late 18th century can be found in the Central State Historical Archive. This fortress was situated on the right bank of the Tigil River, approximately thirty miles from its mouth. The area of the fortress spanned around 2,500 square meters and was encircled by a rectangular wooden palisade featuring pointed corners, known as buttresses, which were defended by cannons. Within its grounds, there were barracks, a government office, fur storage facilities, and a church. The eastern and western gates of the fortress led to settlements inhabited by "military servants" and various individuals, including families from the Koryak community. Surrounding Tigil Fortress were forests comprising birch, aspen, poplar, willow, alder, and, to a lesser extent, rowan and raspberry groves. From 1783 to 1786, the fortress served as the administrative center for the Aklansky District.

By the end of the 18th century, the fortress had already lost its original purpose, and its fortifications had fallen into disrepair. In 1810, the famous Russian navigator Vasily Mikhailovich Golovnin visited the site and wrote:

The fortress contains an ancient wooden church, a commander's house similar in every way to the one in the Petropavlovsk harbor, several barns and barracks, and scattered around the fortress are several dozen small houses and huts. The local residents consist of commoners, retired non-commissioned officers, soldiers, and Cossacks.

During the 1760s, the fortress became linked to the endeavors of Captain Timofey Ivanovich Shmalev, a notable explorer of Kamchatka. In the 1820s, Lieutenant Commander Pavel Fyodorovich Kuzmishchev, who was an indefatigable collector of Kamchadal vocabulary and the writer of observations on the peninsula's flora, held the position of commandant. Kuzmishchev engaged in comprehensive agronomic experiments in Tigil and also provided instruction at the local school he established.

By the beginning of the 20th century, the village of Tigil had become the largest settlement in northwestern Kamchatka.
