= Elizovo Airport =

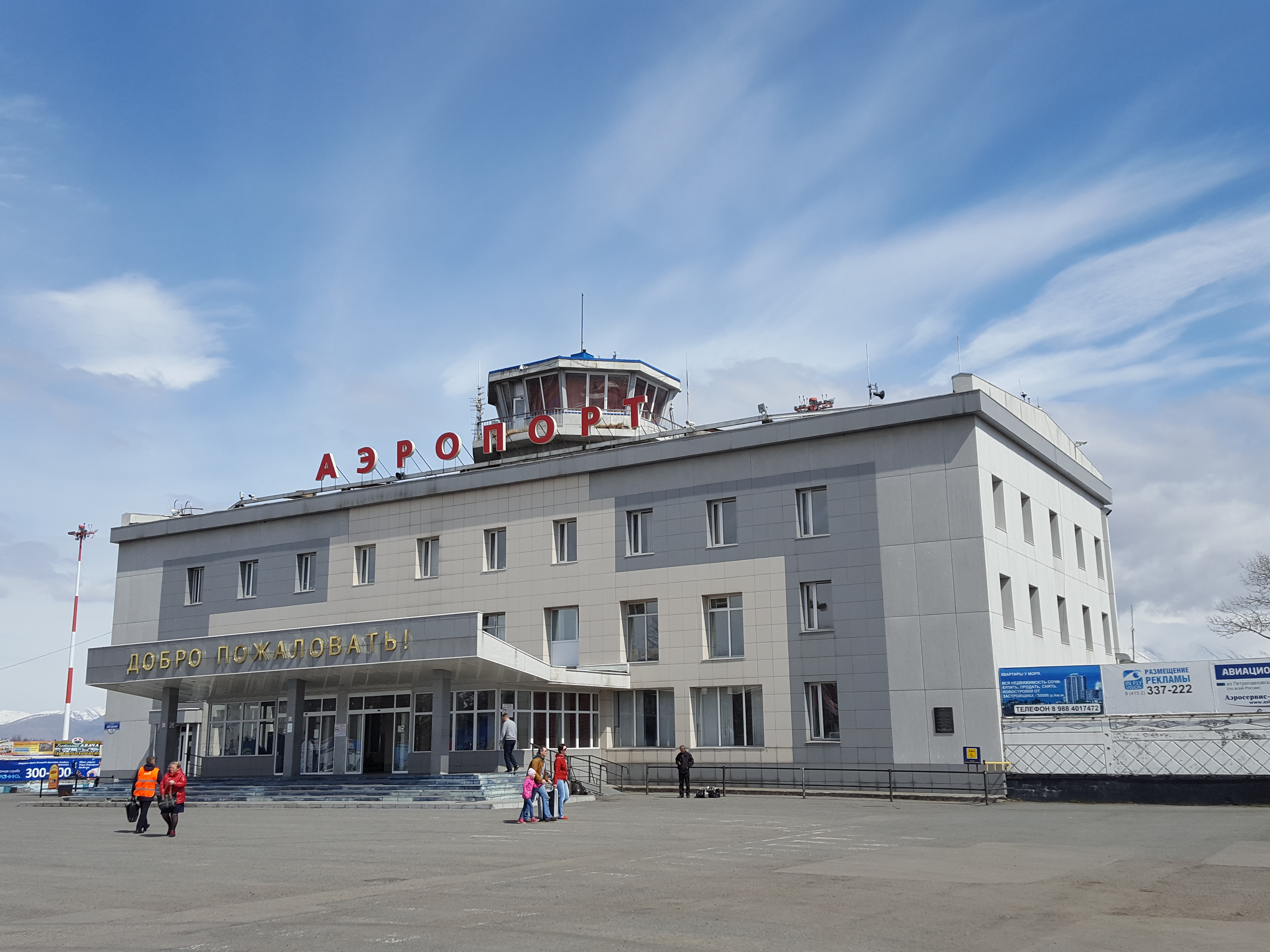
- IATA: PKC; ICAO: UHPP; LID: ПРЛ

Summary
- Airport type: Public
- Operator: Petropavlovsk-Kamchatsky Air Enterprise
- Serves: Petropavlovsk-Kamchatsky
- Location: Petropavlovsk-Kamchatsky, Russia
- Hub for: Petropavlovsk-Kamchatsky Air Enterprise
- Elevation AMSL: 131 ft (40 m)
- Coordinates: 53°10′3.72″N 158°27′12.96″E
- Website: ar-pkc.ru/en/

Map
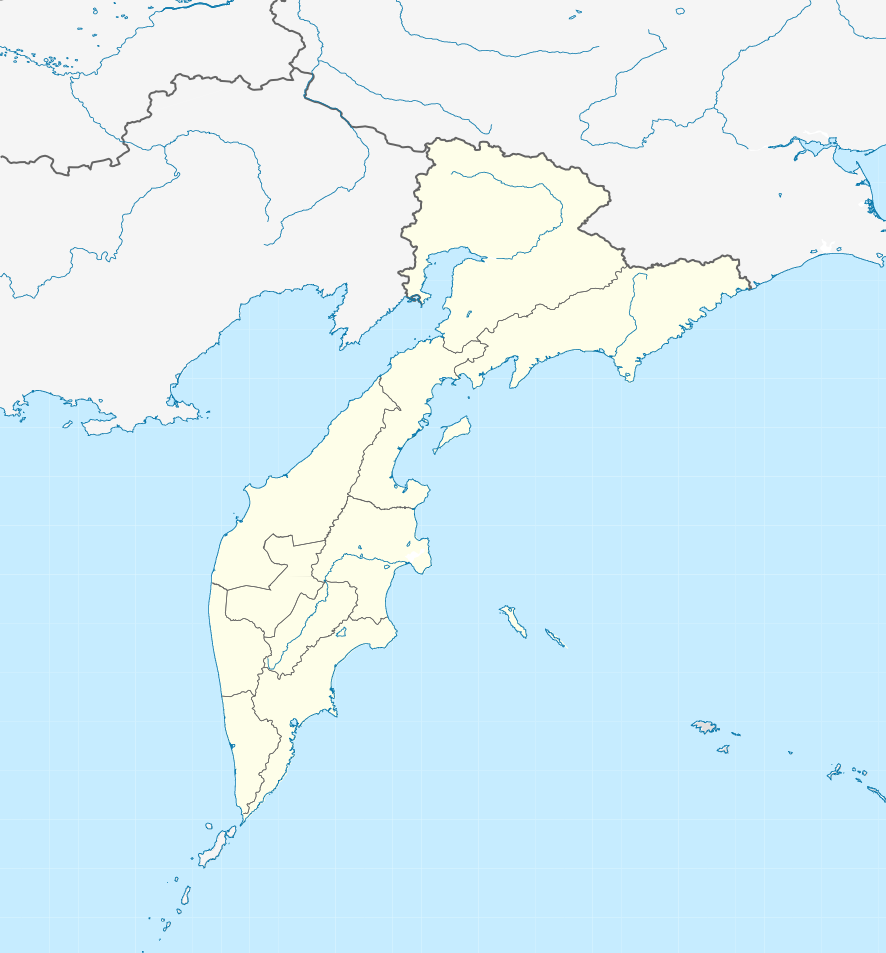
- Location of airport in Kamchatka Krai PKC (Russia)

Runways
Direction	Length		Surface
Direction	ft	m	Surface
12/30	735	224	Asphalt
~~16L/34R~~; Closed	8,235	2,510	Concrete
16R/34L	11,155	3,400	Concrete

Statistics (2020)
- Passengers: 554,057

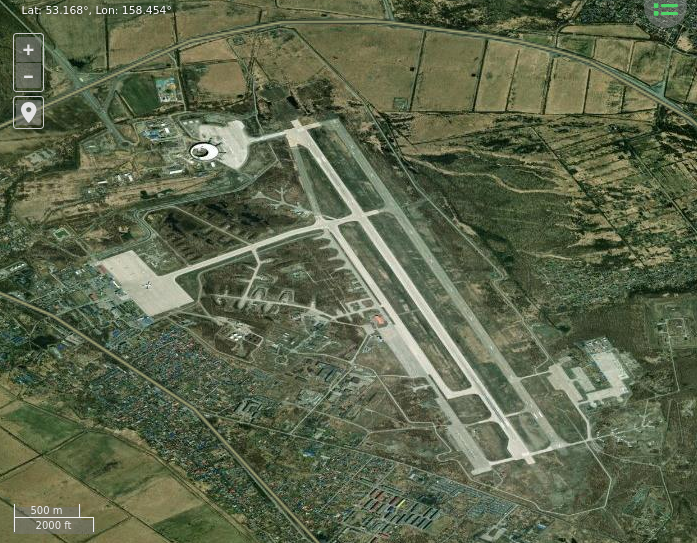
Satellite imagery of Elizovo Airport

Elizovo Airport (Russian: Аэропорт Елизово) (IATA: PKC, ICAO: UHPP), also known as Yelizovo Airport or Petropavlovsk-Kamchatsky Airport, is located in the Russian Far East city of Petropavlovsk-Kamchatsky, Kamchatka Krai. Its main runway is 3,400 m (11,155 ft) long.

One of the first mentions of the Elizovo airfield dates back to 1942.

In accordance with international agreements (with Japan), Soviet Russia did not have the right to maintain military aircraft in Kamchatka. Until the end of World War II, military aviation in Kamchatka was represented by the 71st mixed aviation regiment of the 1st OKA Far Eastern Fleet and the 2nd separate naval bomber aviation regiment of the NKVD Border Troops. There was essentially no airfield network; a hydroairfield built on Lake Khalaktyrskoye was used.

On May 4, 1942, the formation of the 128th Mixed Aviation Division began at the Elizovo airfield on the basis of the 71st separate mixed aviation regiment of the 1st OKA Far Eastern Fleet.

== Military operating unit ==
The base is home to the 175th Independent Shipborne Anti-submarine Helicopter Squadron, 317th Independent Composite Antisubmarine Aviation Regiment, Independent Unmanned Aerial vehicle Squadron and the 865th Fighter Aviation Regiment which are all part of the 7060th Order of Labour Red Banner Naval Aviation Air Base.

The 888th Fighter Aviation Regiment was formed from March 1942. It was deployed in Yelizovo and Ozerny until October 1945 flying the Bell P-63 Kingcobra fighter aircraft. After the war, it flew to the Baikovo airfield (formerly Japanese Kataoka) in the Kuriles. The regiment was disbanded as a result of reductions in the Soviet Armed Forces in 1958.

The 865th Fighter Aviation Regiment (865 IAP) was activated as an Assault Aviation regiment in 1939. After two redesignations, it was renamed the 410th Assault Aviation Regiment in October 1944. It has been located at the base since 1945. In April 1949, it was renamed again as the 865th Fighter Aviation Regiment, and was later transferred to the Soviet Air Defence Forces, and renamed the 865th Fighter Aviation Regiment PVO. From April 1986, it was assigned to the 6th Air Defence Division, 11th Independent Air Defence Army, PVO, until its reassignment to the Soviet Pacific Fleet. On 1 July 1998, it was transferred to the Russian Pacific Fleet. It was equipped with Sukhoi Su-15s from 1974 to 1985, and was reequipped with Mikoyan MiG-31s in 1985.

In November 1961, the 317th Independent Mixed Aviation Regiment (317 OSAP) of the Pacific Fleet was established to be a headquarters for an independent long-range reconnaissance aviation squadron flying Tupolev Tu-16Rs; an independent anti-submarine aviation squadron equipped with Beriev Be-6s; and an anti-submarine helicopter squadron with Mil Mi-4M "Hounds". In 1969 Beriev Be-12 aircraft arrived to replace the earlier maritime aircraft. In 1989 the three squadrons were renumbered as the 1st to 3rd Squadrons of the 317th Independent Mixed Aviation Regiment. The Tu-16Rs left service in 1993.

Naval operations have also taken place here with Tupolev Tu-95MS aircraft with unidentified units.

As recently as 2024, Google Maps satellite imagery showed several dozen MiG-31 aircraft dispersed throughout the airfield, and a large number of turboprop transports and helicopters.

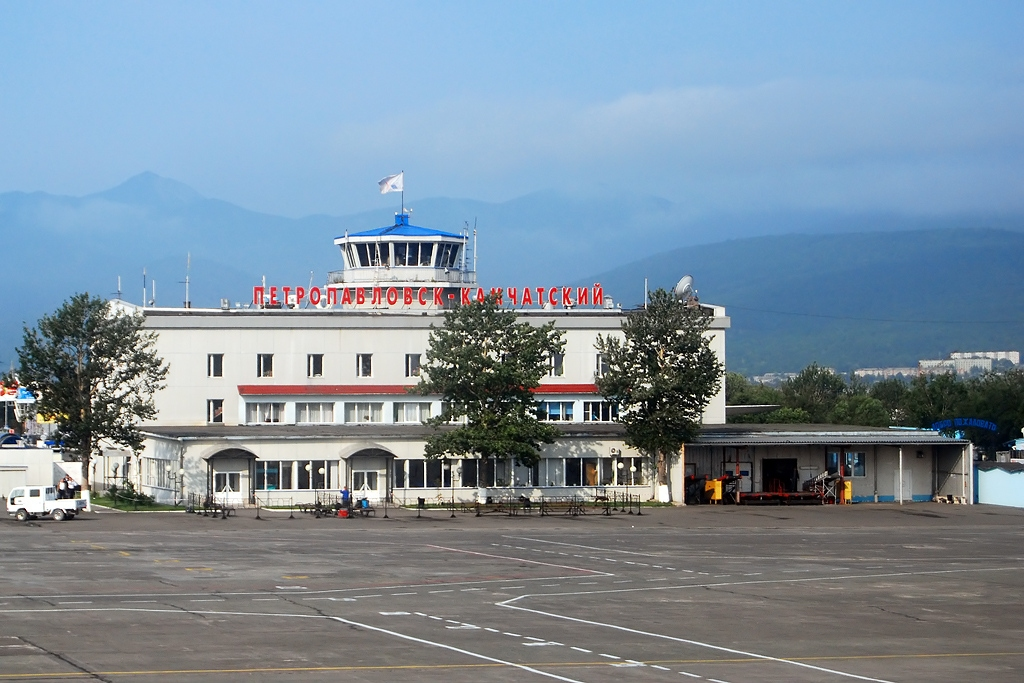
Passenger terminal viewed from aircraft apron

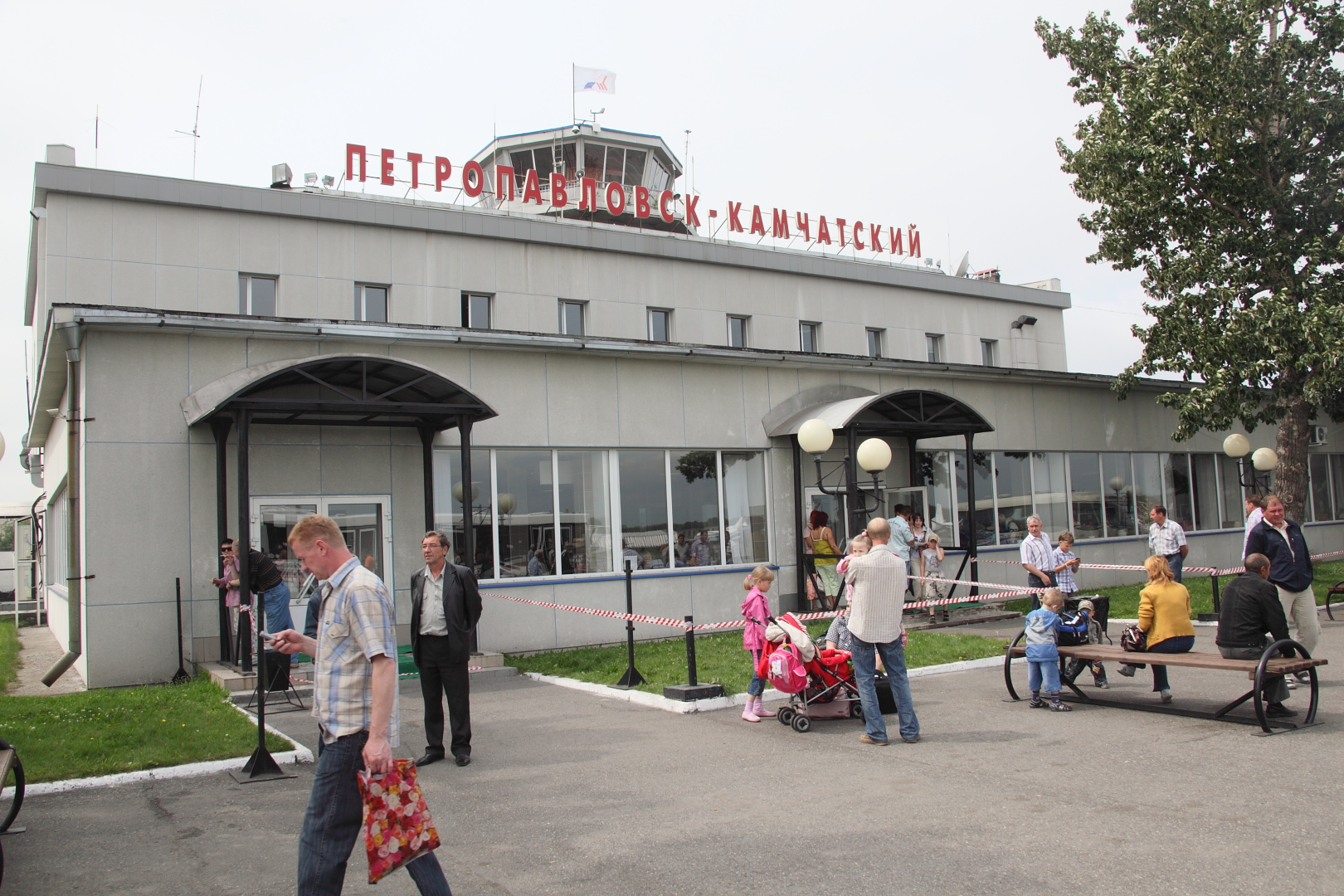
Terminal access to airport apron

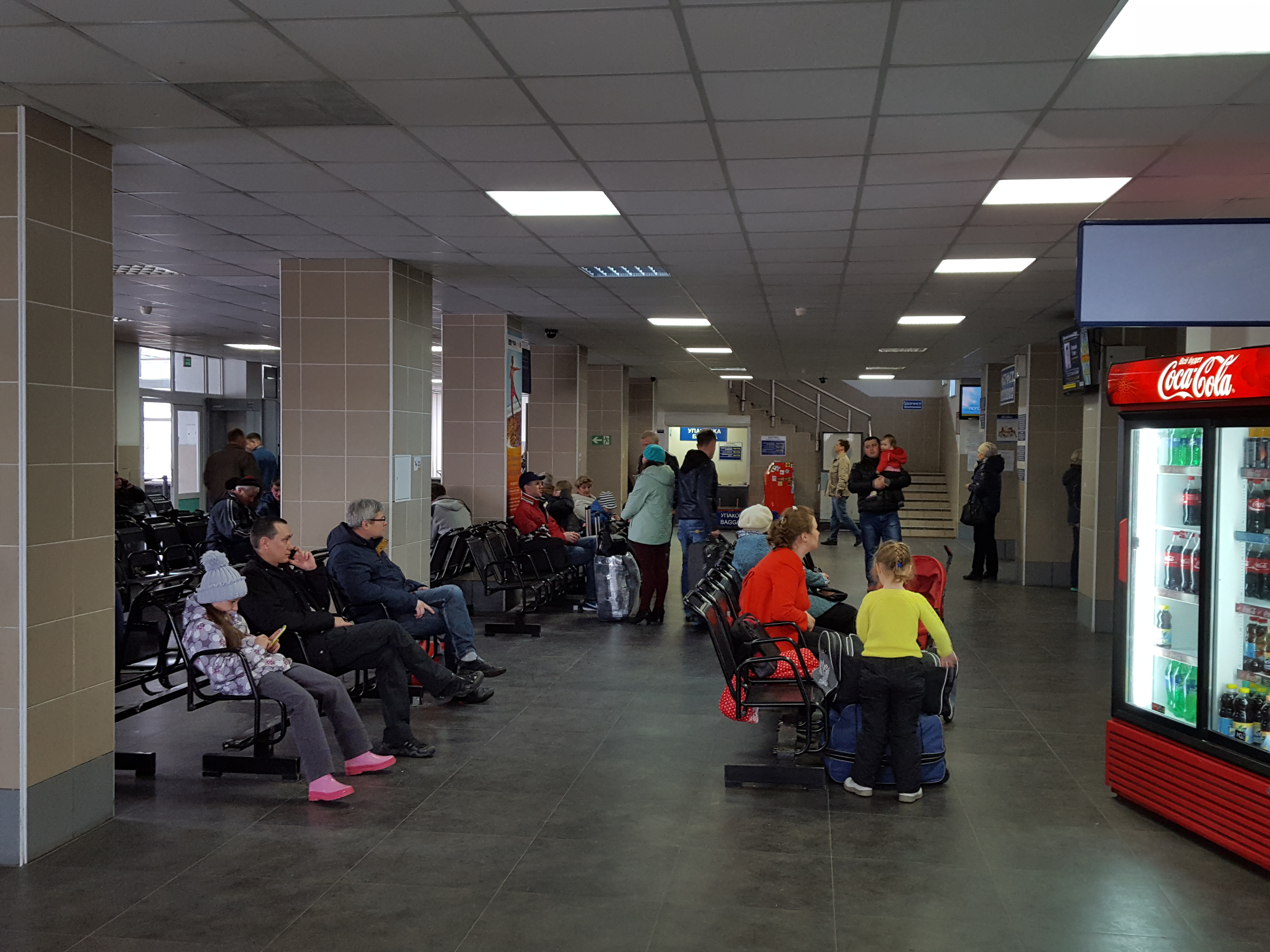
Terminal waiting area

Airliner World ran a feature in their August 2008 issue on 'Aviation in Kamchatka,' leading with descriptions of Elizovo. It confirmed the basing of 865 IAP and 317 OSAP, and commented 'the numbers of local military aircraft in open storage do catch the eye'...'difficult to assess whether the aircraft are active or not.' One photo showed a total of eleven MiG-31s parked closely together in two groups directly in front of two hardened aircraft shelters built into the hillside.

== Runway reconstruction ==
On 1 April 2012, reconstruction began on runway 16R/34L in order to widen it to 45 m (148 ft) and extend it by 900 m (2,953 ft) to 3,400 m (11,155 ft) in order to better accommodate larger planes. Terminal and apron improvements are also included in the project.

== New terminal ==
In August 2017, Airports of Regions, an airport management company, had the winning bid in a competition to construct a new passenger terminal at the airport. Originally, construction was scheduled to begin in 2018 with completion by 2021. Construction delays have pushed back the expected completion date to December 2024. The new terminal finally opened on March 31, 2025.

== Statistics ==
Following a pattern where travel restrictions related to the COVID-19 pandemic had a significant impact on aviation world-wide, Elizovo experienced a 27% drop in airline traffic in 2020. For the year there were 5,098 airline sorties from Elizovo, with Aeroflot, S7 Airlines, and Aurora topping the rankings of total passengers. Most Elizovo passengers were transported on Boeing 777-300ER, Airbus A319, and Airbus A320neo airliners. A total of 19 destinations (18 of them regularly scheduled) were on the airport's route network during 2020.

== Airlines and destinations ==
Airlines	Destinations
Aeroflot	Moscow–Sheremetyevo
Aurora	Anadyr, Khabarovsk, Vladivostok, Yuzhno-Sakhalinsk
IrAero	Blagoveshchensk, Harbin, Irkutsk
Petropavlovsk-Kamchatsky Air Enterprise	Magadan, Nikolskoye, Ossora, Ozernaya, Palana, Sobolevo, Tigil, Tilichiki, Ust-Hairyuzovo, Ust-Kamchatsk
Rossiya Airlines	Krasnoyarsk–International, Moscow–Sheremetyevo
S7 Airlines	Irkutsk, Novosibirsk, Vladivostok

== See also ==
- List of airports in Russia
- List of military airbases in Russia
