= Palana, Russia =

Palana Палана
- Urban-type settlement
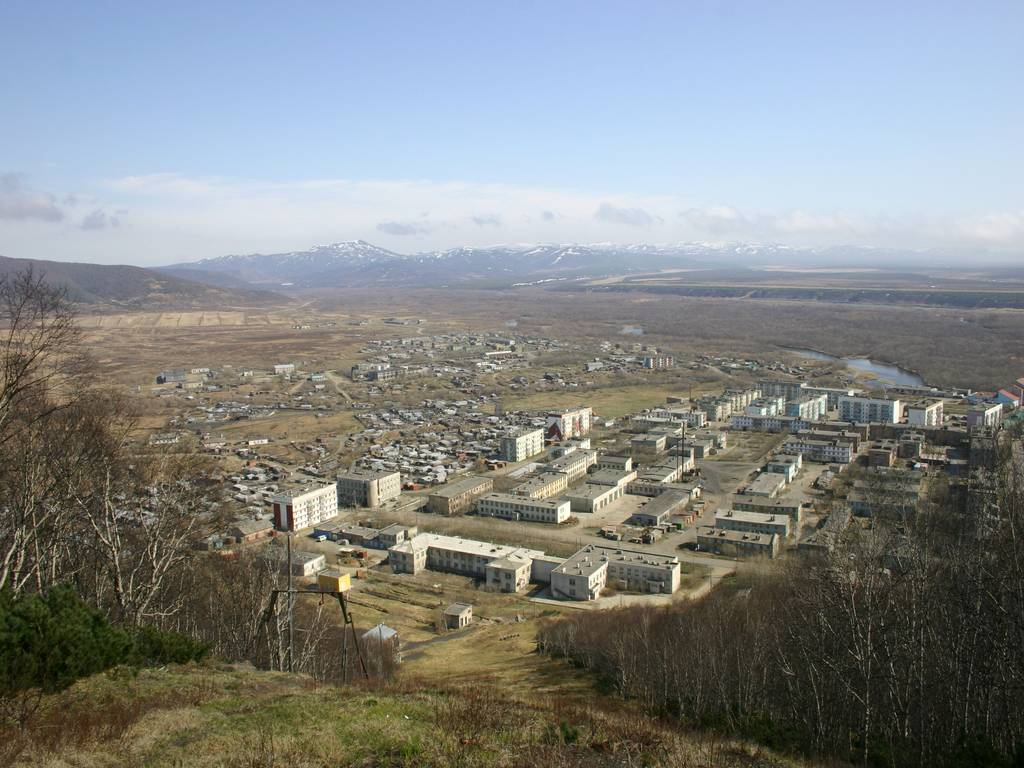
- View of Palana from a hill

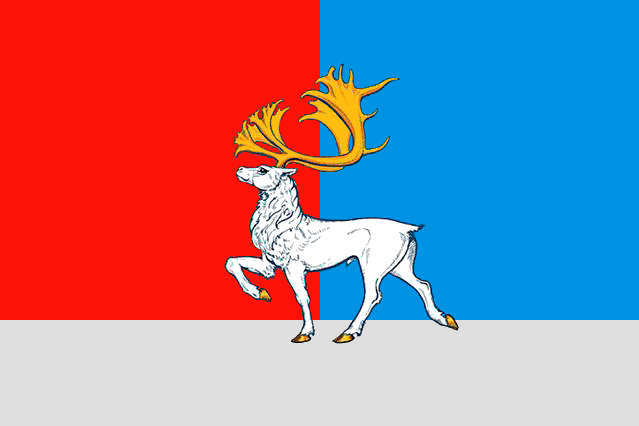
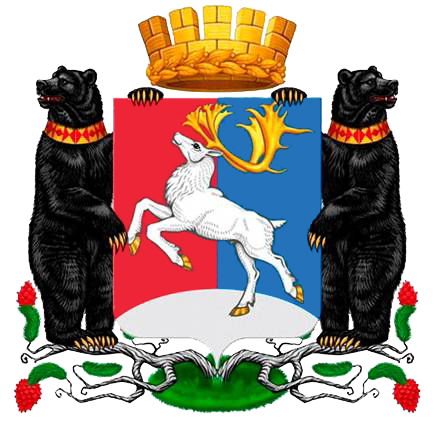
- Flag Coat of arms
- Interactive map of Palana
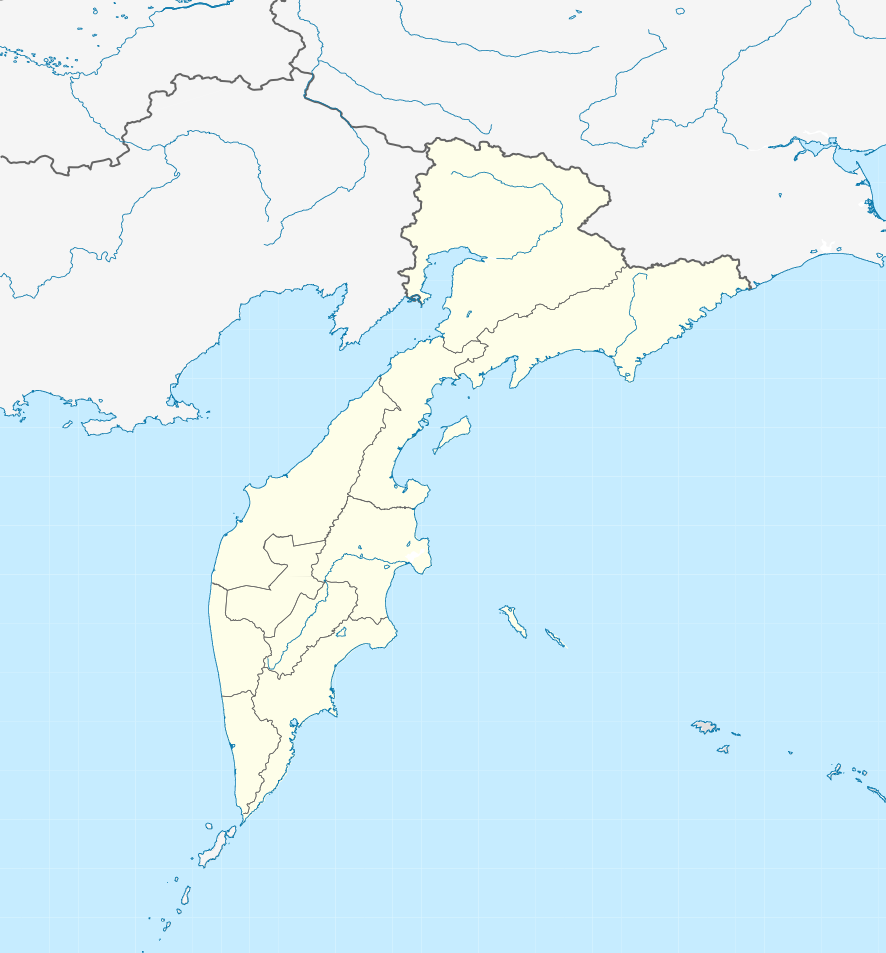
- Location of Palana Palana (Kamchatka Krai)
- Coordinates: 59°05′N 159°56′E
- Country: Russia
- Federal subject: Kamchatka Krai
- Administrative district: Tigilsky District

Population (2010 Census)
  - Total: 3,155
  - Estimate (2025): 2,625 (−16.8%)

Administrative status
  - Capital of: Koryak Okrug

Municipal status
  - Urban okrug: Palana Urban Okrug
  - Capital of: Palana Urban Okrug
- Time zone: UTC+12 (MSK+9)
- Postal code: 688000
- OKTMO ID: 30851000051

Palana (Russian: Пала́на; Koryak: Ӄычг'эт, romanized: Qəcget, Пыльг'ыльг'ын, Pəļgəļgən; Itelmen: Кылхит, Kylhit) is an urban locality (an urban-type settlement) in Tigilsky District of Koryak Okrug of Kamchatka Krai, Russia which serves as the administrative center of Koryak Okrug. The settlement is located on the west coast of the Kamchatka Peninsula on the right bank of the Palana River within 8 kilometers (5.0 mi) from the Sea of Okhotsk. Population: 3,155 (2010 census); 3,928 (2002 census); 4,343 (1989 Soviet census).

== Administrative and municipal status ==
Palana is the administrative center of Koryak Okrug in Kamchatka Krai and, within the framework of administrative divisions, it is subordinated to Tigilsky District of Koryak Okrug. As a municipal division, the urban-type settlement of Palana is incorporated as Palana Urban Okrug.

== Transportation ==
It is served by the Palana Airport.

== Culture ==
There are several dance ensembles, both professional and amateur, in Palana.

=== Media ===
Internet access is provided by KamchatSvyazInform from Petropavlovsk-Kamchatsky.

== Climate ==
Palana has a subarctic climate (Köppen Dfc), intermediate between those of the Sakha Republic and the eastern coast of the Kamchatka Peninsula. The Sea of Okhotsk freezes during the winter and thus there is less moderation of temperatures during this season than is found on the Pacific side of the peninsula, and the Aleutian Low tends to produce more precipitation.

Climate data for Palana (1955-1991)
Month	Jan	Feb	Mar	Apr	May	Jun	Jul	Aug	Sep	Oct	Nov	Dec	Year
Record high °C (°F)	7.8 (46.0)	10.0 (50.0)	12.0 (53.6)	15.0 (59.0)	19.7 (67.5)	29.1 (84.4)	29.7 (85.5)	28.0 (82.4)	21.1 (70.0)	19.0 (66.2)	12.0 (53.6)	11.0 (51.8)	29.7 (85.5)
Mean daily maximum °C (°F)	−12.1 (10.2)	−11.3 (11.7)	−6.3 (20.7)	−0.1 (31.8)	6.7 (44.1)	13.2 (55.8)	16.5 (61.7)	15.6 (60.1)	11.6 (52.9)	4.4 (39.9)	−3.6 (25.5)	−9.8 (14.4)	2.1 (35.7)
Daily mean °C (°F)	−17.5 (0.5)	−17.1 (1.2)	−12.8 (9.0)	−5.6 (21.9)	2.2 (36.0)	7.7 (45.9)	11.2 (52.2)	10.6 (51.1)	6.3 (43.3)	−0.1 (31.8)	−8.4 (16.9)	−15 (5)	−3.2 (26.2)
Mean daily minimum °C (°F)	−22.8 (−9.0)	−22.8 (−9.0)	−19.3 (−2.7)	−11 (12)	−2.4 (27.7)	2.2 (36.0)	5.8 (42.4)	5.6 (42.1)	1.0 (33.8)	−4.6 (23.7)	−13.1 (8.4)	−20.1 (−4.2)	−8.7 (16.3)
Record low °C (°F)	−47 (−53)	−42.8 (−45.0)	−38.9 (−38.0)	−29.5 (−21.1)	−19.4 (−2.9)	−5 (23)	−2.2 (28.0)	−7.8 (18.0)	−11.1 (12.0)	−21 (−6)	−34 (−29)	−40 (−40)	−47 (−53)
Average precipitation mm (inches)	44.7 (1.76)	47.4 (1.87)	46.3 (1.82)	72.8 (2.87)	72.9 (2.87)	87.8 (3.46)	110.7 (4.36)	125.4 (4.94)	93.6 (3.69)	121.1 (4.77)	88.4 (3.48)	67.4 (2.65)	978.5 (38.54)
Average precipitation days	9.1	7.1	7.3	7.4	6.9	6.1	7.3	8.4	8.5	11.3	12.2	9.1	100.7
Source: climatebase.ru (1955-1991)
