= Kamchatka Air Enterprise =

Russian airline

Petropavlovsk-Kamchatsky Air Enterprise
IATA	ICAO	Call sign
-	PTK	PETROKAM
- Founded: 1948; 78 years ago
- Hubs: Petropavlovsk-Kamchatsky Airport
- Fleet size: 9
- Headquarters: Yelizovo, Russia

Petropavlovsk-Kamchatsky Air Enterprise is a passenger airline with the main base in Yelizovo Airport, Petropavlovsk-Kamchatsky, Russia. The airline serves local routes in Kamchatka Krai. Since the end of 2012 it is officially called Kamchatka Aviation/Air Enterprise (in Russian: Камчатское авиационное предприятие) although the old name is also used. In 2020, it became part of Russia's Aurora, along with four other airlines.

It is currently banned from flying into European Union airspace.

== Fleet ==
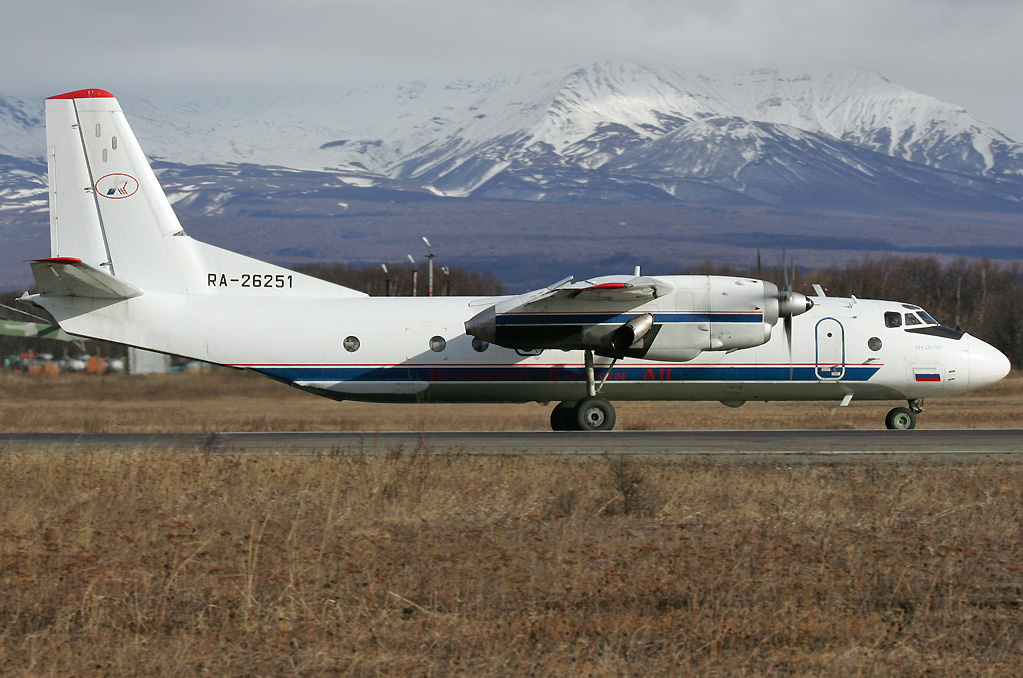
An-26B-100

The Petropavlovsk-Kamchatsky Air Enterprise fleet included the following aircraft in July 2021:

Aircraft	In fleet	Notes
Antonov An-26	1	
Antonov An-26B	3	
Antonov An-28	1	One crashed as Flight 251
Let L-410 Turbolet	2	stopped operations
Yakovlev Yak-40	1	
Yakovlev Yak-40K	4	Cargo
Total	12	

== Accidents and incidents ==
- 23 September 2001: A Yak-40 (registration: RA-87481) was damaged beyond repair after heavy landing resulting in nosegear-collapse at Tigil airfield.
- 16 April 2011: Petropavlovsk-Kamchatsky Air Flight 123 - A Yak-40 (registration: RA-88241) sustained substantial damage in a runway excursion accident at Ust-Kamchatsk. None of the 21 passengers and five crew were injured. The plane took off from Petropavlovsk-Kamchatsky Airport for a short flight to Ossora Airport. Inclement weather forced the crew to divert to Ust-Kamchatsk. Because weather had not improved, the flight was to return to Petropavlovsk-Kamchatsky. During take off on runway 07 the Yak-40 suffered a runway excursion. The right landing gear collapsed and the aircraft came to rest in the snow. As of November 2012 the aircraft has not been reported to be back in service.
- 12 September 2012: Petropavlovsk-Kamchatsky Air Flight 251 - An Antonov An-28 (registration: RA-28715) crashed on approach to Palana; 10 people out of 14 occupants on board died.
- 6 July 2021: An AN-26 of Petropavlovsk-Kamchatsky Air Enterprise, also operating as Flight 251, crashed on approach. Wreckage has been found near Palana Airport. There were no survivors among the aircraft's 28 occupants.
