= Sokoch (river) =

- Location within Kamchatka Krai
- Native name: Сокоч (Russian)

Location
- Country: Russia
- Federal subject: Kamchatka Krai
- District: Yelizovsky District, Ust-Bolsheretsky District

Physical characteristics
- Mouth: Plotnikova
  - location: Sokoch
  - coordinates: 53.159113°N 157.698965°E
- Length: 22 km (14 mi)
- Basin size: 99.5 km^{2} (38.4 sq mi)

Basin features
- Progression: Plotnikova→ Bolshaya→ Sea of Okhotsk

The Sokoch (Russian: Сокоч) is a river in the western Kamchatka Peninsula, Russia, a right tributary of the Plotnikova.

== Course ==
The Sokoch, including its main branch the Right Sokoch, is 22 kilometres (14 mi) long, and drains an area of 99.5 square kilometres (38.4 sq mi). It has one tributary, the Left Sokoch, which joins it 9 kilometres (5.6 mi) from its mouth. The right branch of the river flows from the Bolshoi (Large) Sokoch lake, while the left branch flows from the southeastern spurs of the 1,247 metres (4,091 ft) Sokoch Hill. Lake Sokoch is in what was a proglacial basin between two terminal moraines from the Last Glacial Maximum. Analysis of pollen from the lake sediments over the last 9600 years shows alternating warmer periods of forest cover and cooler periods of shubrlands, tundra and bogs.

The Sokoch enters the Plotnikova from the right at 108 kilometres (67 mi) from the Plotnikova's mouth. The village of Sokoch is the administrative center of the Nachikinskoe rural settlement. It was formed in 1947 as a settlement under the Nachikinsky state farm on the Plotnikova River opposite the mouth of the Sokoch River, and named after the river in 1959.

== Fish ==
The Sokoch is known for its sockeye salmon, which spawn in the upper river above the Sokoch Lake, and in the springs that the upper river and the lake, and in the Little Sokosh Lake upstream from the main lake. Lakeshore spawning is important in the Kamchatka Peninsula, but the Bolhsaya River system has relatively few lakes. Nachikinsky Lake is important, as is the Sokoch lake area.

== Sources ==
- 2010 All-Russian Population Census (PDF)
- Dirksen, Veronika; Dirksen, Oleg; van den Bogaard, Christel; Diekmann, Bernhard (2015), "Holocene pollen record from Lake Sokoch, interior Kamchatka (Russia), and its paleobotanical and paleoclimatic interpretation" (PDF), Global and Planetary Change, 134 (134), Elsevier B.V: 129–141, Bibcode:2015GPC...134..129D, doi:10.1016/j.gloplacha.2015.07.010
- Foerster, R. E. (1968), Bulletin 162 The SOCKEYE SALMON, Oncorhynchus nerka (PDF), Fisheries Research Board of Canada
- "Государственный водный реестр : Река Плотникова (State Water Registry : Plotnikova River)", textual.ru (in Russian), Ministry of Natural Resources of Russia, 29 March 2009
- Lake Big Sokoch (in Russian), 21 June 2003
- Смышляев, Александр (2011), Камчатский край Большерецкие веси (in Russian), Петропавловск-Камчатский: Новая книга, pp. 38–40
- Река Сокоч, Прав. Сокоч (Sokosh River, Right Sokosh) (in Russian), государственного водного реестра (State Water Registry)
- Piragis, A.P. (25 January 2004), Settlements of Kamchatka : Sokoch (in Russian)
- Sokoch map (in Russian)
