= Plotnikova (river) =

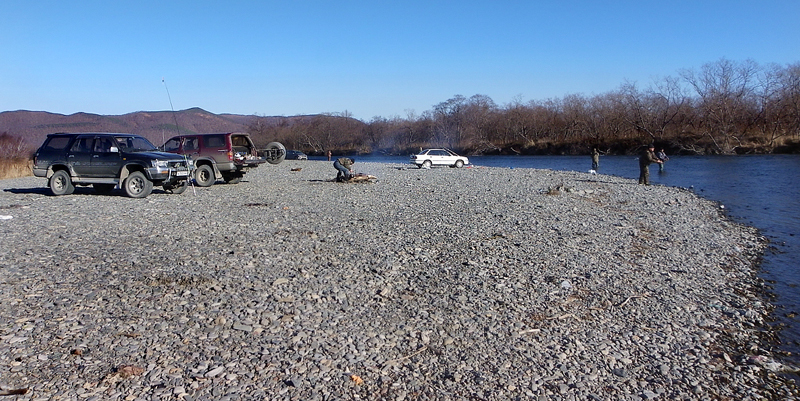
- Plotnikova river: a fishing ground for char (Salvelinus)

- Location within Kamchatka Krai
- Native name: Плотникова (Russian)

Location
- Country: Russia
- Federal subject: Kamchatka Krai
- District: Yelizovsky District, Ust-Bolsheretsky District

Physical characteristics
- Mouth
  - coordinates: 52.886677°N 156.537531°E

Basin features
- Progression: Bolshaya→ Sea of Okhotsk
- Tributaries
  - right: Sokoch

The Plotnikova (Russian: Плотникова) is a river in the western Kamchatka Peninsula, Russia, a tributary of the Bolshaya. It is used for spawning by various species of Pacific salmon.

== Course ==
The Plotnikova flows through the Yelizovsky and Ust-Bolsheretsky districts of the Kamchatka Territory. It originates in Lake Nachikinsky (Russian: озеро Начикинское) at an altitude of 348 metres (1,142 ft), and flows into the Bolshaya 58 kilometres (36 mi) from the river's mouth on west coast of Kamchatka on the Sea of Okhotsk. The river is about 134 kilometres (83 mi) long, and has a catchment area of 4,450 square kilometres (1,720 sq mi). The part of the Bolshaya upstream from its confluence with the Plotnikova is named Bystraya.

== Settlement ==
Bolsheretsk was founded in 1703 as a fort on the Plotnikova. In 1707 rebels destroyed the fort. In 1711 it was rebuilt where the Bystraya and Plotnikova rivers join to form the Bolshaya, 58 kilometres from the river mouth on the Sea of Okhotsk. In the late 1920s the village was abandoned and the inhabitants moved to the new village of Kavalerskoye, and to village of Ust-Bolsheretsk at the mouth of the Bolshaya, which from 1926 became the center of Ust-Bolsheretsky District.

== Fish ==
The river is used by locals and tourists for fishing from rafts or boats. Fish species include rainbow trout, char, grayling, Chinook salmon, coho salmon, sockeye salmon, chum salmon and pink salmon.

== Sources ==
- "Fishing in Kamchatka : Fishing Autotour on the Rivers of Kamchatka", kamchatka.org
- "Fishing on Bolshaya river", kamchatka-fishing.ru
- "Государственный водный реестр : Река Плотникова (State Water Registry : Plotnikova River)", textual.ru (in Russian), Ministry of Natural Resources of Russia, 29 March 2009
- Смышляев, Александр (2011), Камчатский край Большерецкие веси (in Russian), Петропавловск-Камчатский: Новая книга, pp. 38–40
