= Malka, Kamchatka Krai =

Malka
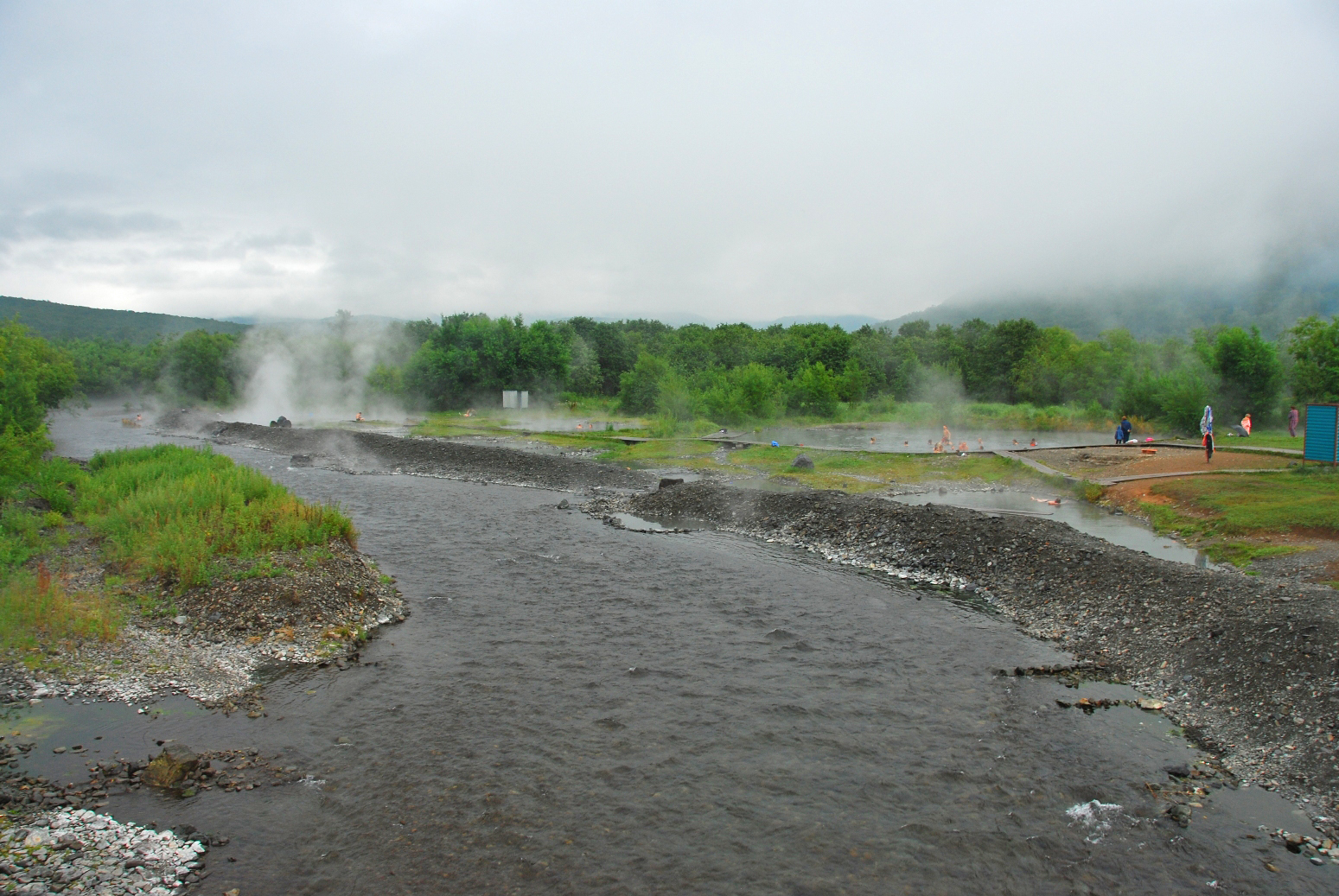
- Malkino hot springs

- Location in Kamchatka Krai
- Coordinates: 53.332860°N 157.473395°E
- Country: Russia
- Federal subject: Kamchatka Krai
- District: Yelizovsky

Population (2002)
  - Total: 59

Malka (Russian: Ма́лка), or Malki (Russian: Ма́лки), is a village in the Yelizovsky District of Kamchatka Krai, Russia. It is to the northwest of Petropavlovsk-Kamchatsky, on the main road running north up the Kamchatka Peninsula. It is part of the Nachikinskoe rural settlement, which has its headquarters in the village of Sokoch. It is known for its nearby hot springs, thought to have therapeutic value, and for a source of mineral waters.

== Location ==
The village is located in a small valley on the left bank of the Bystraya River. It is surrounded by high mountains, and has a hot spring nearby. The village is on the main road from Petropavlovsk-Kamchatsky and Sokoch to Ganaly^{ru}, Atlasovo^{ru} and the Ust-Kamchatsky District. On 7 July 2015 the name was officially changed from Malka to Malki.

== History ==
=== Russian Empire ===
In the 1730s Stepan Krasheninnikov (1711–1755) mentioned "Ahanichev House" between Apacha (Russian: Апачей)^{ru} and Ganaly (Russian: Ганалами)^{ru}, 55 versts (Note: A verst was 1.067 kilometres (0.663 mi).) north of Apacha and 33 versts south of Ganaly. The first use of the name Malka is by the French traveler Barthélemy de Lesseps in 1787. He said it had five or six huts and 15 sheds, on the bank of the Bystraya River, surrounded by high mountains, with a hot spring nearby. In 1811 Captain Vasily Golovnin reported that the inhabitants were occupied in trapping sables in the winter. The hospital was built in 1818 after the people of Kamchatka had experienced an epidemic, one of two in all of Kamchatka. Patients sometimes had to travel several hundred kilometers to reach a hospital.

Karl von Ditmar (1822–1892) visited Malka several times in the 1850s, and considered it one the largest and most prosperous villages in Kamchatka, although it only had 12 houses. The villagers were farming cabbage, turnips, potatoes and horseradish. The village had the house of the director and pharmacist of the hospital, and a wooden swimming pool. In 1868 the distance from Malka to Petropavlovsk-Kamchatsky was found to be 138 versts. The village had an Orthodox chapel at this time. The 1876 census recorded 68 inhabitant of Malki, of whom only three were illiterate. There was a chapel, ten houses, two yurts, a shop, two barns, 19 sheds and two baths. The inhabitants harvested potatoes, turnips, cabbages and large quantities of fish.

By 1895 there were 18 houses and 23 other buildings, with 51 men and 38 women. The villagers had 30 horses, 59 cows, and 188 sled and hunting dogs. Apart from sables, they hunted bears, foxes, otters, mountain sheep and deer. In 1908 the botanist Vladimir Leontyevich Komarov (1869–1945) noted there was a small chapel covered with grass, and small but clean houses, separated by gardens and wastelands. There was a shortage of building materials, but the village was one of the wealthiest in the area and was growing. In 1909 a one-room parish school was opened in the village, but the level of teaching was very poor. The village belonged to the Bolsheretsk parish, but due to the distance the priest rarely visited. Most of the inhabitants were Kamchadals, apart from one Russian family.

=== Soviet era ===
During the Russian Civil War (1917–1922) the inhabitants of Malka were seen as reactionaries by the communists, but were spared violence. In July 1924 the local Kamchatka historian Prokopiy Trifonovich Novograblenov (1892–1934) described the village in the report to the Russian Geographical Society. Set in dramatic mountain scenery, he called Malki a small village of the usual plain-looking Kamchadal type, with small wooden houses covered with grass, located on the left bank of the Bystroy river. The location was poor, and the river that ran through the village flooded it in the spring. The rapid and powerful Bystraya River threatened to wash away the island on which the western part of Malka was located. There had been a failure of fish income the previous year, and as a result 75% of the sled dogs and almost 50% of the livestock had died.

The primary school in 1924 was a small thatched building, poorly built. Nearby was a good, spacious log house with an iron roof, started as a post office but never finished. The people of Malka obtained the building for the school, but were unable to finish construction. The openings for the windows and doors remained empty. The state decreed universal compulsory education in 1930. In 1944 there were 16 students in the Malka school.

Construction of collective farms in Kamchatka Krai began in 1929 and continued for the next three years. It did not go well, due to poor leadership and coordination. Malka was among the last where a collective farm was formed, the "May 1 Farm", established in 1932. By 1 January 1939 the farm had 13 families, with a total of 52 people. There were 15 able-bodied men, 10 women and 25 laborers. Farmland included 2 hectares (4.9 acres) of arable land, 8 hectares (20 acres) of vegetable plots and 70 hectares (170 acres) of meadows. V.I. Semenov described Malka at the end of the 1960s as a tiny village of several rickety little houses that were blackened by time.

Malka was part of the Milkovo District, but communication with Milokovo was difficult, since it was 200 kilometres (120 mi) away. A highway built from Petropavlovsk towards the village of Nachiki improved communications, and on 5 September 1944 Milka and Nachiki were transferred to the administrative region of the city of Petropavlovsk-Kamchatsky. On 12 February 1956 a general meeting of citizens was attended by 64 of the 72 adults who lived in the village. It was decided to abolish the Malkinsky Village Council and make Malka part of the Nachikinsky Village Council. In the early 1970s, the main Kamchatka road connected Petropavlovsk-Kamchatsky, first with the district center of Milkovo, and then with Atlasovo and the Ust-Kamchatsky District. Most of the road runs between the Eastern and Sredinny (or Middle) ranges. It crosses many rivers and streams along its length. In the 1980s there was a canteen in Malka to serve travelers and long-distance truck drivers transporting lumber from Atlasovo.

== The village today ==
As of 2002 the population was 59, or whom 83% were Russians. The people of the village today are Kamchadals, Atlasovs, Panovs, Permyakovs, Durynins and Abakumovs. Residents of Kamchatka and tourists mainly come to Malka for the hot springs and the mineral water. The springs are in the Klyuchevke river valley, 4 kilometres (2.5 mi) from the Petropavlovsk-Milka road. The temperature of the water at the outlet reaches 84 °C (183 °F). As well as the mineral springs there is a fish breeding plant, which employs a few of the local people.

The cold mineral spring that supplies the Malkinsky Mineral Water Bottling Plant is on the right bank of the Bystroy river, 1.5 kilometres (0.93 mi) above the village of Stary Malki. The water temperature is 5.6 °C (42.1 °F). The CJSC "Malkinskoe" bottled water plant was founded in 1998 to exploit the Malkinskoe carbon dioxide mineral water. Products include medicinal mineral water, regular mineral water and various soft drinks, and are sold in most Far Eastern centers. The company is actively looking for customers in Central Russia and in Asia-Pacific, including Japan, Vietnam and South Korea.

== Sources ==
- Borisov, Viktor (2008), "Мalka (part 1)", Gazeta Vesti (in Russian), archived from the original on 2007-12-15
- Borisov, Viktor (2008b), "Мalka (part 2)", Gazeta Vesti (in Russian), archived from the original on 2007-12-15
- "Water is enough for everyone", East of Russia
- Закон Камчатского края ... 17 июля 2015 (Law of the Kamchatka Territory ... 17 July 2015) (in Russian)
- Коряков Ю.Б. (2002), 2002 Камчатская область (in Russian)
