= Yelizovsky =

Yelizovsky (masculine), Yelizovskaya (feminine), or Yelizovskoye (neuter) may refer to:

- Yelizovsky District, a district of Kamchatka Krai, Russia
- Yelizovskoye Urban Settlement, a municipal formation in Yelizovsky Municipal District which Yelizovo Town Under Krai Jurisdiction in Kamchatka Krai, Russia is incorporated as
