= Bolshaya (river) =

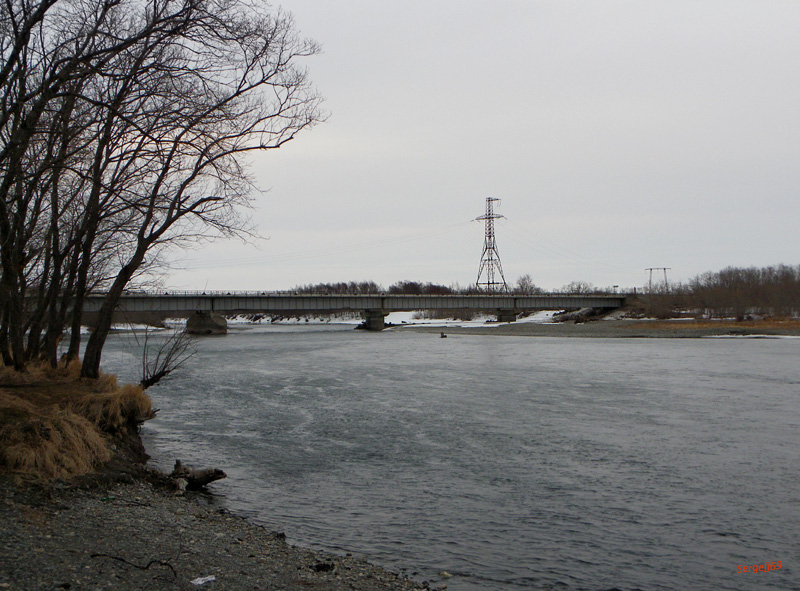
- A bridge over the Bystraya near the village of Kavalerskoye

- Location within Kamchatka Krai
- Native name: Большая (Russian)

Location
- Country: Russia
- Federal subject: Kamchatka Krai
- District: Yelizovsky District, Ust-Bolsheretsky District

Physical characteristics
- Mouth
  - location: Sea of Okhotsk
  - coordinates: 52.725420°N 156.220058°E
- Length: 275 km (171 mi)
- Basin size: 10,800 km^{2} (4,200 sq mi)

Basin features
- State Water Register: 19080000212120000025788

The Bolshaya (Russian: Большая, upstream from its confluence with the Plotnikova: Быстрая Bystraya) is a river in the western Kamchatka Peninsula, Russia. It is used for spawning by various species of Pacific salmon. The Bolshaya (including its upper course Bystraya) is 275 kilometres (171 mi) long and has a catchment area of 10,800 square kilometres (4,200 sq mi).

== Course ==
The Bolshaya is the largest river in the west of the Kamchatka Peninsula. It rises in the southern end of the Eastern Range (Ganal Range), as does the river Kamchatka, which flows to the east. The sources of the Bolshaya are in the Ganalsky Range. The upper part is called the Bystraya. This is joined from the left by the Plotnikova at 58 kilometres (36 mi) from the river mouth to form the Bolshaya.

The Plotnikova is 134 kilometres (83 mi) long, with a catchment area of 4,450 square kilometres (1,720 sq mi). There are many other tributaries, including the Nachilova and Goltsovka. The basin has more than one thousand lakes. There are mineral springs in the basin, including the notable Malkinskoye deposit. The mountains of the upper basin have exposed crystalline rocks, while lower down, the land is mostly covered in peat. The banks are lined with typical Kamchatka forest, with birch and dwarf cedar.

The river is 1–3 metres (3 ft 3 in – 9 ft 10 in) deep and up to 100 metres (330 ft) wide. It forms the Bolshaya Lake at its mouth. At its mouth the Bolshaya is more than 0.5 miles (0.80 km) wide. It flows in a generally-southwesterly direction to the coast, where it turns and flows in a south-southeast direction for about 10 miles (16 km) along the east side of a narrow sand-and-gravel spit before emptying into the Sea of Okhotsk at the end of the spit. An 1870 account said that it received the river Apatcha above the town of Bolsheretsk (Note: Not to be confused with Ust-Bolsheretsk. The original settlement of Bolsheretsk was abandoned in 1928, and the inhabitants moved to Kavalerskoye^{ru} and Ust-Bolsheretsk near the river mouth.) and then ran for 20 miles (32 km) to the Sea of Okhotsk. Large boats could navigate the river to within eight miles of the town. According to the United States Hydrographic Office (1932):

This river is the largest on the west coast of Kamchatka. It forms a narrow inlet, separated from the sea by a narrow strip of sand and gravel, 13 miles long; the river mouth is near the southern end of the inlet. At 27 miles from the entrance the river is joined by its large tributary, the Bistraya River, and at the junction is the settlement of Bolsheryetsk. The settlement has telegraphic communication with Petropavlovsk. Two other rivers, the Amshigacha and the Ozernaya Srednaya also enter the inlet.

== Settlements ==
The village of Malka is on left bank of the upper part of the river. The first use of the name Malka is by the French traveler Barthélemy de Lesseps in 1787. He said it had five or six huts and 15 sheds, on the bank of the Bystraya, surrounded by high mountains, with a hot spring nearby.

The village of Bolsheretsk was located near the point where the Reka Bolshaya and Reka Bystraya converge, about 10 miles (16 km) upstream of Ust-Bolsheretsk. In the late 1920s, the people of that village on the islands decided to relocate to a more convenient location on the Kavalerskaya channel six miles (9.7 km) down the river. In the spring of 1928, there were already three houses on the Kavalerskaya channel, and two more were under construction. The new village was formed by 1930. Until 1990, it was called the Bolsheretsky state farm (Russian: Большерецкий совхоз) after its location on the right bank of the Bolshaya. In 1990 it was renamed Kavalerskoye.

== Russian exploration ==
Russian explorers led by Vladimir Atlasov reached the river at the end of the 17th century, and the first map of the region was based on their accounts. The Cossack geographer Semyon Remezov mentioned the river at the start of the 18th century, calling it "Kiksha". This is probably close to the original Itelmen language name, from the word "kyg", which means "river". "Reka Bolshaya" means "Big River" in Russian. The name Bolshaya was given in the 18th century to distinguish it from the other, smaller rivers in the region.

The estuary was used as a sanctuary by sailors, who would enter at high tide. When the tide fell, the boats would rest on their sides, but the soft bottom saved them from damage. The German geologist and traveler Karl von Dietmar, who visited the region in the middle of the 19th century, noted that the mouth of the river had been relocated to the north by the local people before the Russians arrived so that the fish would follow a route that made them easier to catch. There were a number of shipwrecks at the mouth of the river in the 18th century, including the galliot Okhotsk and the flotilla of three ships commanded by Lieutenant V. Khmetevsky.

== Fish ==
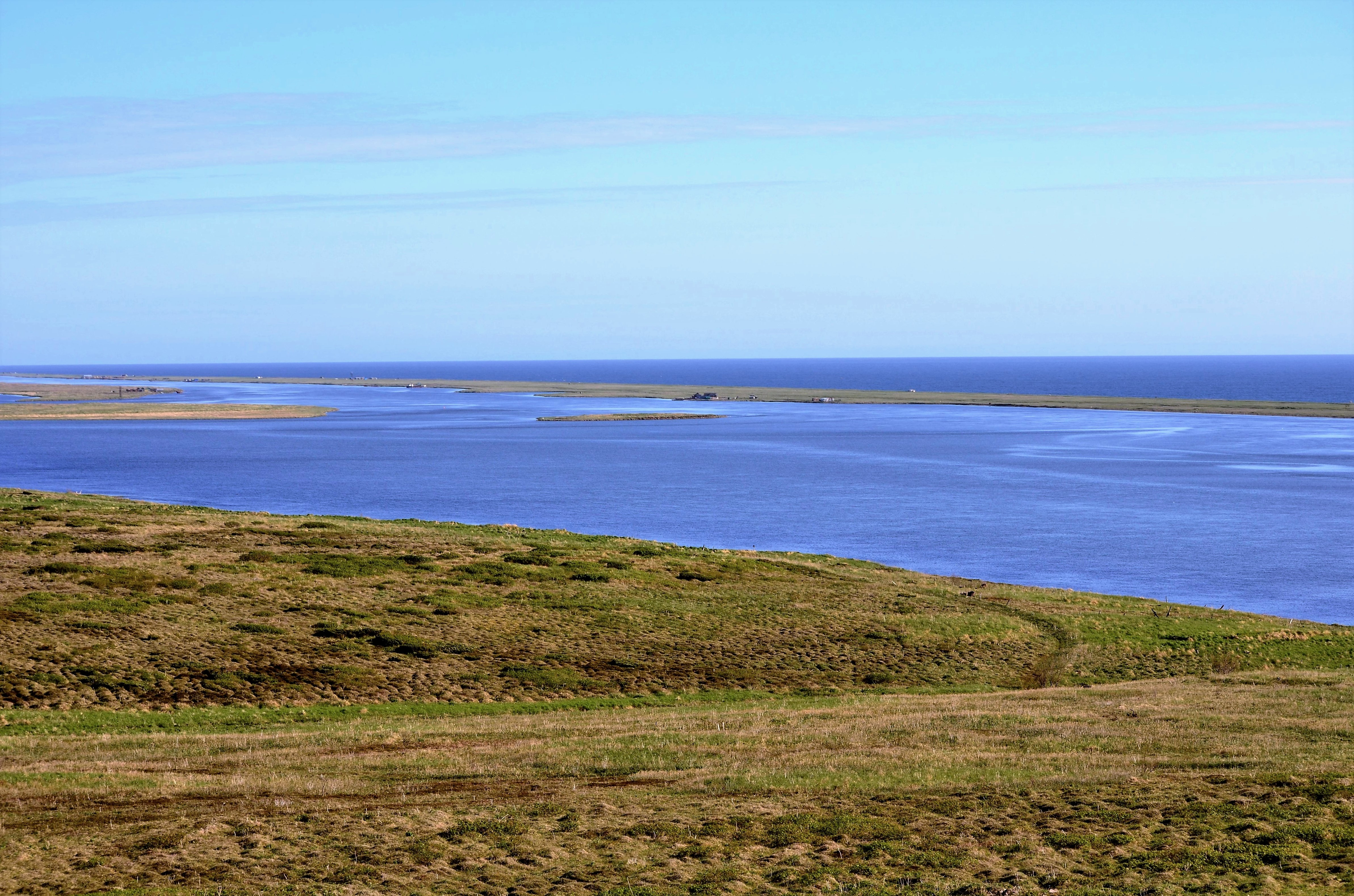
The river between the spit and the sea

In the summer, pink salmon, chinook salmon, coho salmon, sockeye salmon, and arctic char spawn in the river. Historically, the Bolshaya has been one of the world's most productive wild salmon rivers, with diverse salmon species. It is one of the main chum salmon rivers in west Kamchatka, along with the Icha and Kikhchik rivers. These three rivers are also the main coho streams in the region. Chum salmon migrate in the Bolshaya at about 14 kilometres (8.7 mi) per day. Pink salmon spawn in the Bolshaya 160 kilometres (99 mi) from the sea. In years with large runs, they go further upstream than in years when the runs are smaller.

Most of the 320,000 inhabitants of the Kamchatka Peninsula live in the south, near to the Bolshaya. The river has provided a vital source of food and work for many local communities. In addition to commercial fishing, amateur fishing is also widespread. In the decades leading up to 2010, there have been high levels of blatantly illegal fishing, uncontrolled by the corrupt law enforcement and fishery agencies, and threatening the fish stocks. In 2011, a public salmon council was created in Ust-Bolsheretsky District to protect the salmon of the lower Bolshaya basin, and in 2013, a second council was created to protect the upper part of the basin. These councils have been active in combating poaching and restoring sustainable fishing practices.

== Sources ==
- Borisov, Viktor (2008), "Мalka (part 1)", Gazeta Vesti (in Russian), archived from the original on 2007-12-15
- American Geographical and Statistical Society (1870), Journal of the American Geographical and Statistical Society
- "Fishing on Bolshaya river", kamchatka-fishing.ru
- Groot, G. (1991), Pacific Salmon Life Histories, UBC Press, ISBN 978-0-7748-0359-5
- Смышляев, Александр (2011), Камчатский край. Большерецкие веси, Петропавловск-Камчатский: Новая книга, pp. 38–40
- Населенные пункты Камчатки (даты возникновения, наименования, переименования, упразднения; краткая топонимика Камчатки)
- ProStar (2004), Prostar Sailing Directions 2004 East Coast of Russia Enroute, ProStar Publications, ISBN 978-1-57785-560-6
- Restoring the Bolshaya, Wild Salmon Center, 1 January 2013
- "Река Большая", KamchatkaLand (in Russian)
- United States Hydrographic Office (1932), Sailing Directions for Siberia and Chosen, from Cape Syeverni and Wrangell Island to the Orycku Ko (Yalu River) Including Sakhalin Island, U.S. Government Printing Office
