= Kavalerskoye =

Kavalerskoye Кавалерское
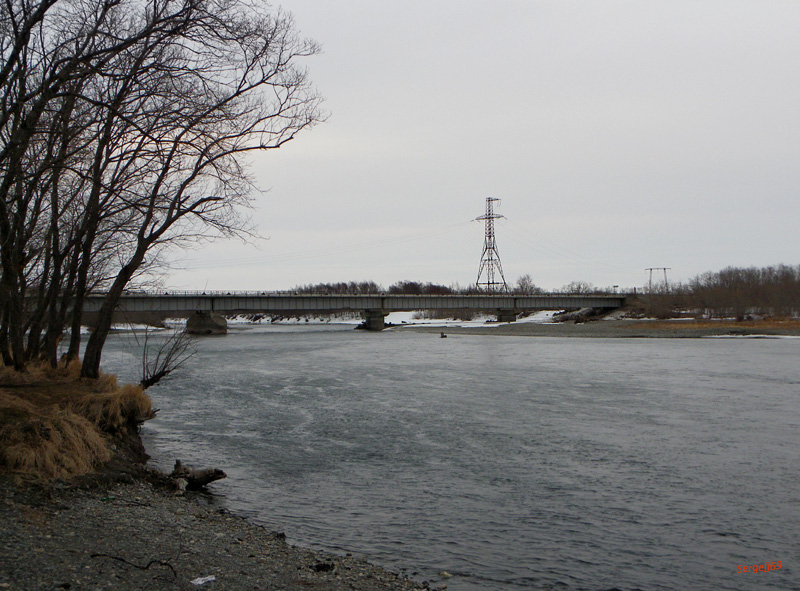
- A bridge over the Bystraya near the village of Kavalerskoye

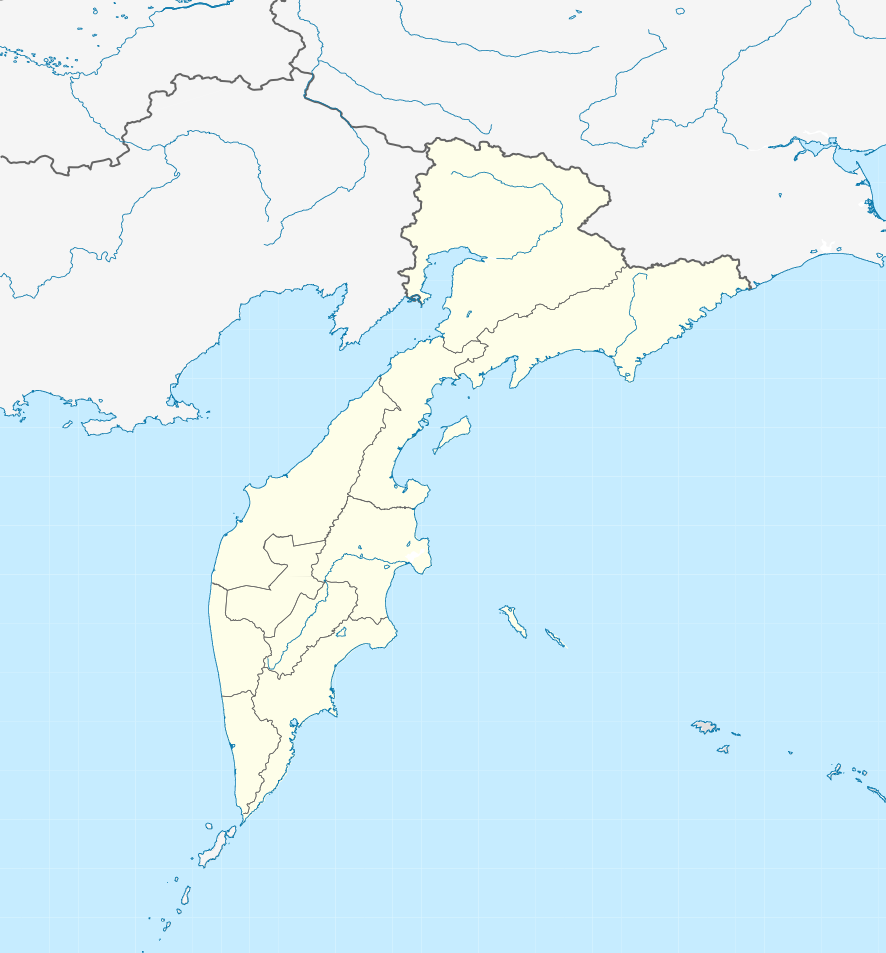
- Location in Kamchatka Krai
- Coordinates: 52.92889°N 156.57333°E
- Country: Russia
- Federal subject: Kamchatka Krai
- District: Ust-Bolsheretsky District

Population (2020)
  - Total: 806
- Time zone: UTC+12
- Postal code: 684121
- Website: www.kavalerskoe.ru

Kavalerskoye (Russian: Кавалерское) is a village and rural settlement in the Ust-Bolsheretsky District of the Kamchatka Krai federal subject of Russia. The village is the administrative center of the Kavalerskoye rural settlement.

== Location ==
The rural settlement has an area of 17.55 square kilometres (6.78 sq mi). The distance to the regional center (Petropavlovsk-Kamchatsky) is 195 kilometres (121 mi) by road and 100 kilometres (62 mi) by air. The district center of Ust-Bolsheretsk is 23 kilometres (14 mi) away. The village is located on the right bank of the Bolshaya.

== History ==
The village was established by the inhabitants of Bolsheretsk. The people of that village on the islands a few miles upstream decided to relocate to a more convenient location on the Kavalerskaya channel six miles down the river. In the spring of 1928, there were already three houses on the Kavalerskaya channel, two more were under construction. The new village was formed by 1930. Until 1990, it was called the Bolsheretsky state farm (Russian: Большерецкий совхоз) after its location on the right bank of the Bolshaya. In 1990 it was renamed Kavalerskoye.

== Population ==
Year	Population	Reference
2002	962	
2010	798	
2020	806	

== Streets ==
The village has 11 streets: Levaya Naberezhnaya street, Stroitelnaya street, Sovetskaya street, Shkolnaya street, Ryabikova street, Komsomolskaya street, Pravaya Naberezhnaya street, Naberezhnaya street, Blucher street, Central street, Pervomaiskaya street.
