= Nikolayevka, Kamchatka Krai =

Village in Kamchatka Krai, Russia

Nikolayevka Николаевка
- Selo
- Interactive map of Nikolayevka
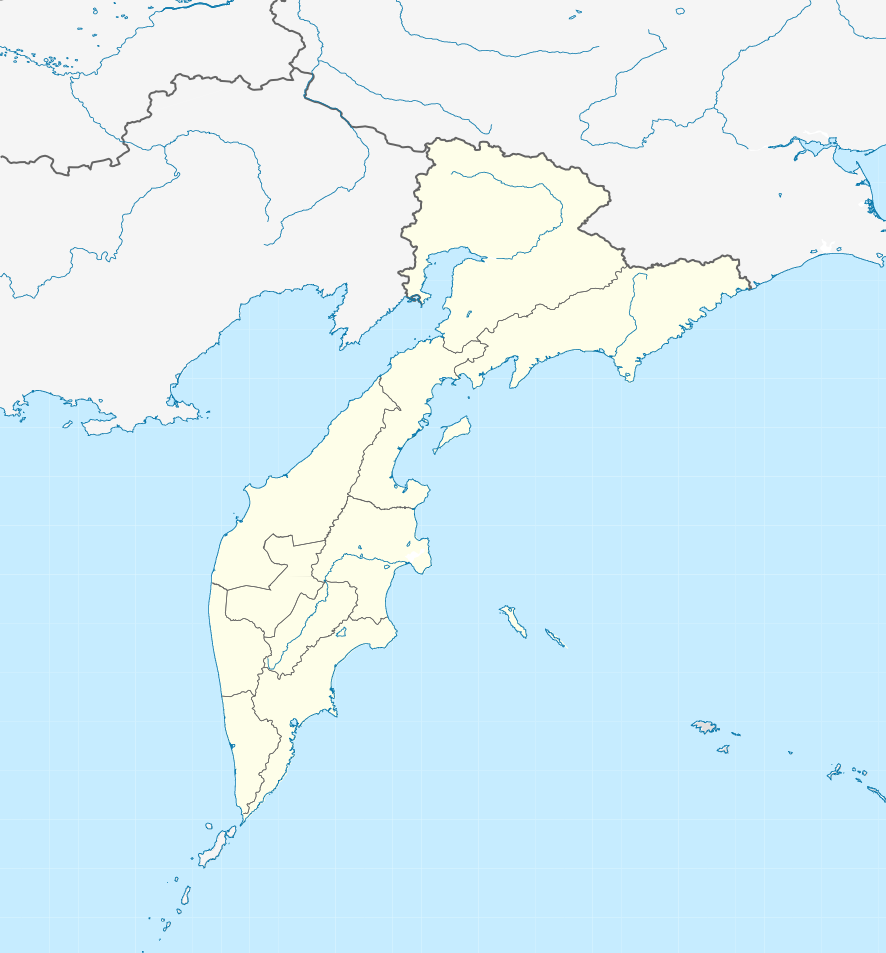
- Location of Nikolayevka Nikolayevka (Kamchatka Krai)
- Coordinates: 53°02′43″N 158°20′10″E
- Country: Russia
- Federal subject: Kamchatka Krai
- Administrative district: Yelovsky District

Population
  - Estimate (2020): 1,815 )
- Time zone: UTC+12 (MSK+9)
- Postal code: 684032
- OKTMO ID: 30607413101

Nikolayevka (also romanized as Nikolaevka) is a village (selo) in the Yelizovsky District of Kamchatka Krai, Russia. It is the administrative center of the Nikolayevskoye Rural Settlement.

== Geography ==
Nikolayevka is approximately 17 kilometres (11 mi) southwest of the city of Yelizovo, the Yelizovsky District's administrative center. The village is also located several kilometers west of Avacha Bay.

Nikolayevka has historically been placed in the subarctic climate zone (Dfc) of the Köppen climate classification system, though analysis of 1991-2020 climate data has suggested the village now sits in the warm-summer humid continental climate zone (Dfb).

== History ==
Nikolayevka was founded in 1853 on the Paratunka River by peasants migrating eastward, and it was named in honor of Tsar Nicholas I. A leper colony was once located in the village.

On 31 August 2024, a Mil Mi-8 helicopter bound for Nikolayevka's local private airport crashed about 20 kilometres (12 mi) north of the village, killing all 22 occupants. At the time, the helicopter was being used in a tour of the nearby Vachkazhets volcano. On-board passengers included Arseny Zamyatin, the Russian Football Union's chief financial officer.

== Demographics ==
Population
Year	2002	2012	2013	2015	2016	2018	2020
Pop.	1,839	1,829	1,829	1,829	1,833	1,818	1,815
±%	—	−0.5%	+0.0%	+0.0%	+0.2%	−0.8%	−0.2%
