= Sokoch =

Sokoch Сокоч
- Selo
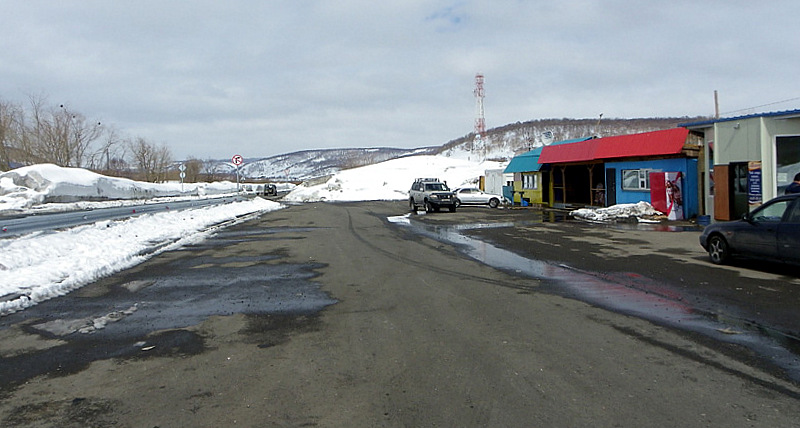
- Interactive map of Sokoch
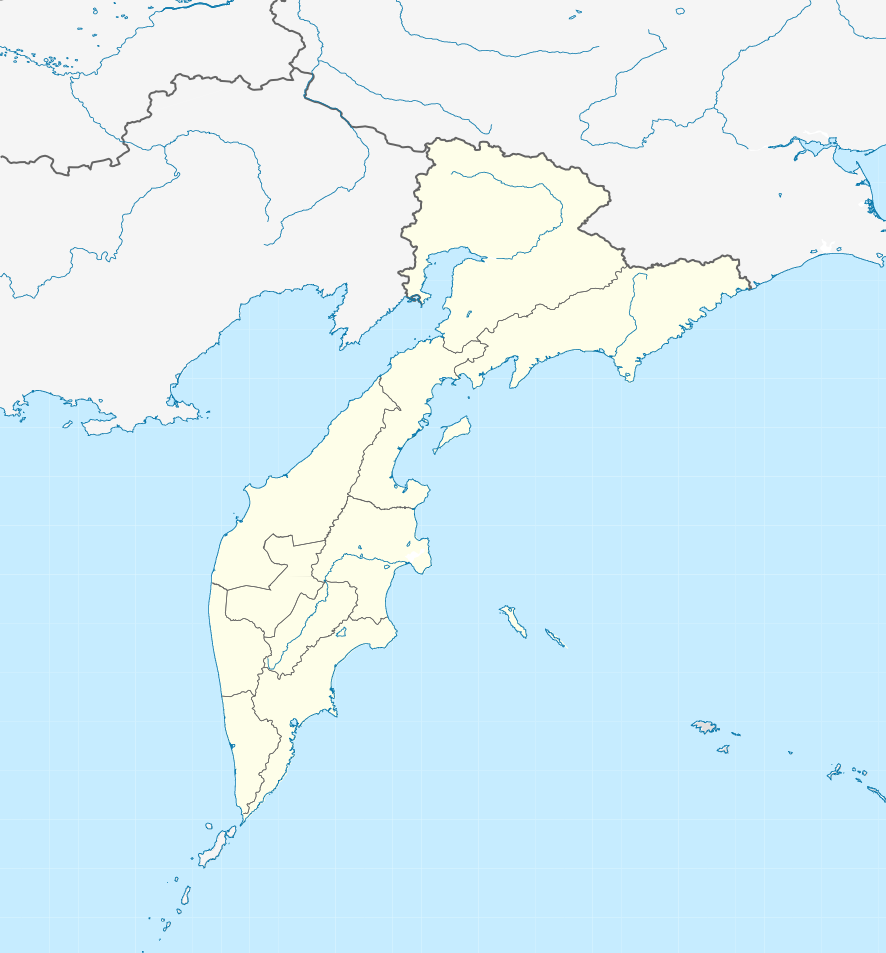
- Location of Sokoch Sokoch (Kamchatka Krai)
- Coordinates: 53°09′05″N 157°41′24″E
- Country: Russia
- Federal subject: Kamchatka Krai
- Administrative district: Yelovsky District

Population
  - Estimate (2010): 903 )
- Time zone: UTC+12 (MSK+9)
- Postal code: 684029
- OKTMO ID: 30607410101

Sokoch (Russian: Сокоч) is a rural locality in the Yelizovsky District of Kamchatka Krai in Far Eastern Russia. It is the administrative centre of Nachikinsky and lies 66.6 kilometres (41.4 mi) by road west of Yelizovo. The settlement was established in 1947 at the confluence of the rivers Plotnikova and Sokoch. In 2010 it had a population of 903 people. The river Sokoch is noted for its salmon.
