= Koryaki =

Koryaki Коряки
- Selo
- Location of Koryaki
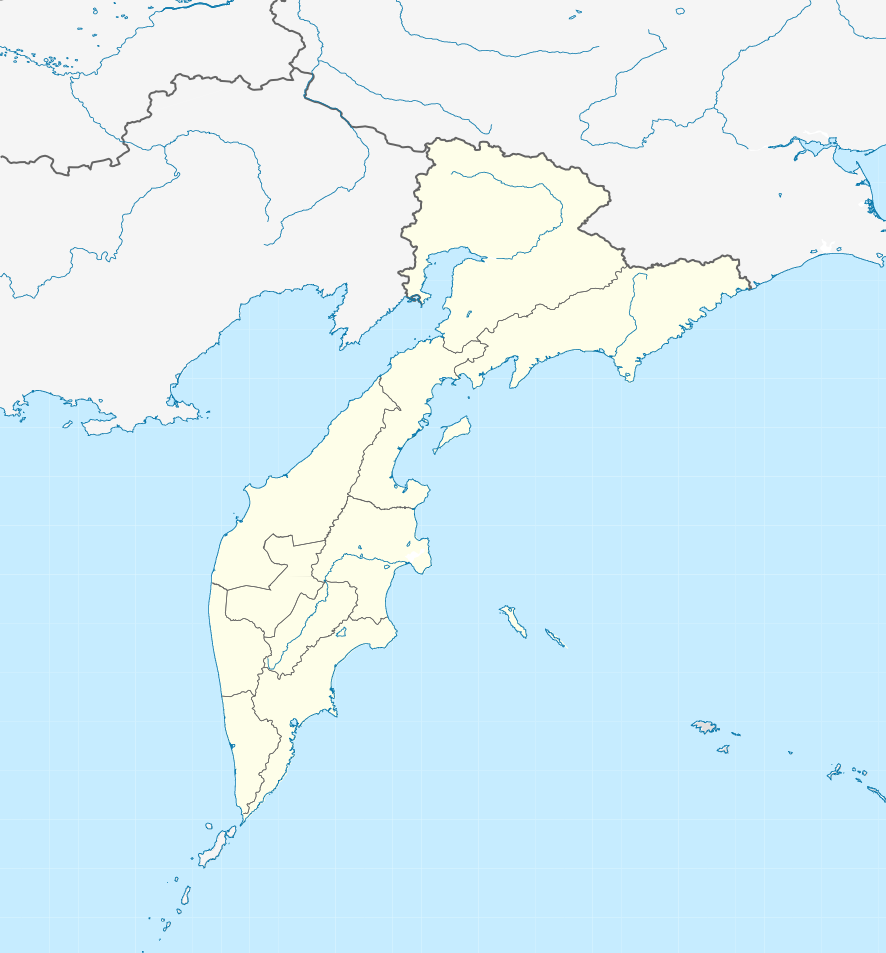
- Location of Koryaki Koryaki (Kamchatka Krai)
- Coordinates: 53°16′51″N 158°12′28″E
- Country: Russia
- Federal subject: Kamchatka Krai
- Administrative district: Yelovsky District

Population
  - Estimate (2010): 2,735
- Time zone: UTC+12 (MSK+9)
- Postal code(s): 684021
- OKTMO ID: 30607407101

Koryaki (Russian: Коряки) is a rural locality in the Yelizovsky District of Kamchatka Krai in Far Eastern Russia. It is located 15 km (9.3 mi) north-west of Yelizovo. In 2010, it had a population of 2,735 people.
