= Bolsheretsk =

Ghost town in Ust-Bolsheretsky, Kamchatka, Russia

Coordinates: 52.9092°N 156.5511°E

Bolsheretsk (Russian: Большерецк) or Bolsheretsky jail is an abandoned village on the west coast of the Kamchatka Peninsula in Russia. Over a 200-year period, Bolsheretsk was a military fort, a prison, a port, and a village.

Bolsheretsk was founded in 1703 as a fort on the Plotnikova River. In 1707, rebels destroyed the fort. In 1711, it was rebuilt where the Bystraya and Plotnikova rivers join to form the Bolshaya River, 55 kilometers (34 mi) from the river mouth on the Sea of Okhotsk.

Bolsheretsk had square earthworks with a side of 21.6 m (71 ft) on a crest. The fort had a palisade of poles. In 1715, the poles were replaced by a log fence. The fortifications lasted until the beginning of the 1770s. Bolsheretsk contained state buildings, churches, stores, a monastery, and houses. In 1726, there were 17 residential yards. Starting in 1823, Bolsheretsk went into decline and only consisted of a ramshackle church and 10 residential yards. In 1909, there were 19 yards. The village was situated on several islands separated by channels.

In the 18th century, the population was military: in 1727, around 40 people; in 1759, 79; in 1775, 152; and in 1799, 24. By 1810, they had grown to 150 people. The main occupations of the inhabitants were fishing, hunting, gardening, and cattle breeding. Bolsheretsk was an important transit point on the sea route from Okhotsk to Kamchatka during this time. Many expeditions passed through here on their way to the Kuril Islands and Northern Pacific. In 1739, the Bolsheretsk shipyard built the sloop Bolsheretsk.

Between 1740 and 1803, Bolsheretsk was the residence of the Kamchatka commanders. In 1770, convicts Pyotr Khrushchov, Maurice Benyovszky, and others organized a rebellion. They killed the commandant, captured the galliot Saint Peter, and sailed to France.

In the 19th century, the jail was converted into the village Bolsheretsk. In 1928, the village was abolished, and the inhabitants moved to the nearby bayou, where the village of Kavalerskoe was located, and to the mouth of the Bolshaya River, to the village of Ust-Bolsheretsk, which became the center of Ust-Bolsheretsky District.
