= Kikhchik (river) =

- Location within Kamchatka Krai
- Native name: Кихчик (Russian)

Location
- Country: Russia
- Federal subject: Kamchatka Krai
- District: Ust-Bolsheretsky District

Physical characteristics
- Mouth: Sea of Okhotsk
  - location: Kikhchik
  - coordinates: 53.419866°N 156.037717°E
- Length: 103 km (64 mi)
- Basin size: 1,950 km^{2} (750 sq mi)

The Kikhchik (Russian: Кихчик) is a river in the western Kamchatka Peninsula, Russia. It is used for spawning by various species of Pacific salmon.

== Course ==
The Kikhchik is in the Anadyr-Kolyma Basin District. It is 103 kilometres (64 mi) long, and has a catchment area of 1,950 square kilometres (750 sq mi). Its mouth is on the Sea of Okhotsk on the west coast of the Kamchatka Peninsula. The main river is formed where the Left Kikhchik branch is joined by the Right Kikhchik about 24 kilometres (15 mi) from its mouth. The river is fairly shallow, no more than 1.5–2 metres (4 ft 11 in – 6 ft 7 in) in most parts of its lower-middle and lower stretches.

The water is very clear, since many of the tributaries are fed from springs. Near its mouth the river enters a long, brackish lagoon that is separated from the sea by a sand and pebble spit. The river flows along this spit, which holds a fishery, for about 2 miles (3.2 km) before entering the sea. (Note: The source says the river flows north along the spit. A Google satellite view in 2020 showed the river flowing south along the spit for about 2 miles (3.2 km), but the lagoon extending well to the north of the point where the river enters it. It is possible that the point where the river breaks through the spit has changed – or that the source is in error.)

== Name ==
In the first Russian maps from the beginning of the 18th century the river is named Chikcha, Chikchin, Chiuchin, Kykhchik, etc. The name probably comes from the Itelmen language hchukyg, meaning "river".

== Fish ==
The Kikhchik is one of the main chum salmon rivers in west Kamchatka, along with the Bolshaya and Icha rivers. These three rivers are also the main coho streams in the region. The chum salmon ascend the rivers for spawning between June and September, with the greatest numbers in July or August. G. V. Belavin worked at Kikhchik from 16 April to 13 September 1929. He noted that the chinook salmon migration into the river ended around mid-June, while chum salmon were taken in June and continued to migrate until September.

The river is home to several thousand chinook, sockeye, pink, chum and coho salmon. It also holds large populations of char, freshwater trout and steelhead trout. A 1987 study found that migratory arctic char in the Kikhchik River had a fecundity fork length at age five of 325 millimetres (12.8 in) and a life span of ten years.

== Sources ==
- 53.419866,156.037717
- Fishing : Kikhchik River, Kamchatka Outfitters, archived from the original on February 1, 2020
- Groot, G. (1991), Pacific Salmon Life Histories, UBC Press, ISBN 978-0-7748-0359-5
- ProStar (2004), Prostar Sailing Directions 2004 East Coast of Russia Enroute, ProStar Publications, ISBN 978-1-57785-560-6
- "Река Кихчик", Камчатский туристический портал (in Russian)
- Река Кихчик, Лев. Кихчик (Кумша) (in Russian), государственного водного реестра
- Tallman, Ross F.; Saurette, Fernand; Thera, Trevor (1996), "Migration and life history variation in Arctic charr, Salvelinus alpinus", Écoscience, 3 (1), Taylor & Francis, Ltd.: 33–41, doi:10.1080/11956860.1996.11682312, JSTOR 42900995
- The Board (1962), Translation Series, The Board
- Tokranov, A.M.; Bugaev, V.F. (2011), Где крупнее лососи? (Where is the largest salmon?) (in Russian), Petropavlovsk-Kamchatsky: Kamchatpress, p. 72, ISBN 978-5-9610-0160-0
