= Kikhchik =

Kikhchik Кихчик
- Former urban-type settlement
- Location of Kikhchik
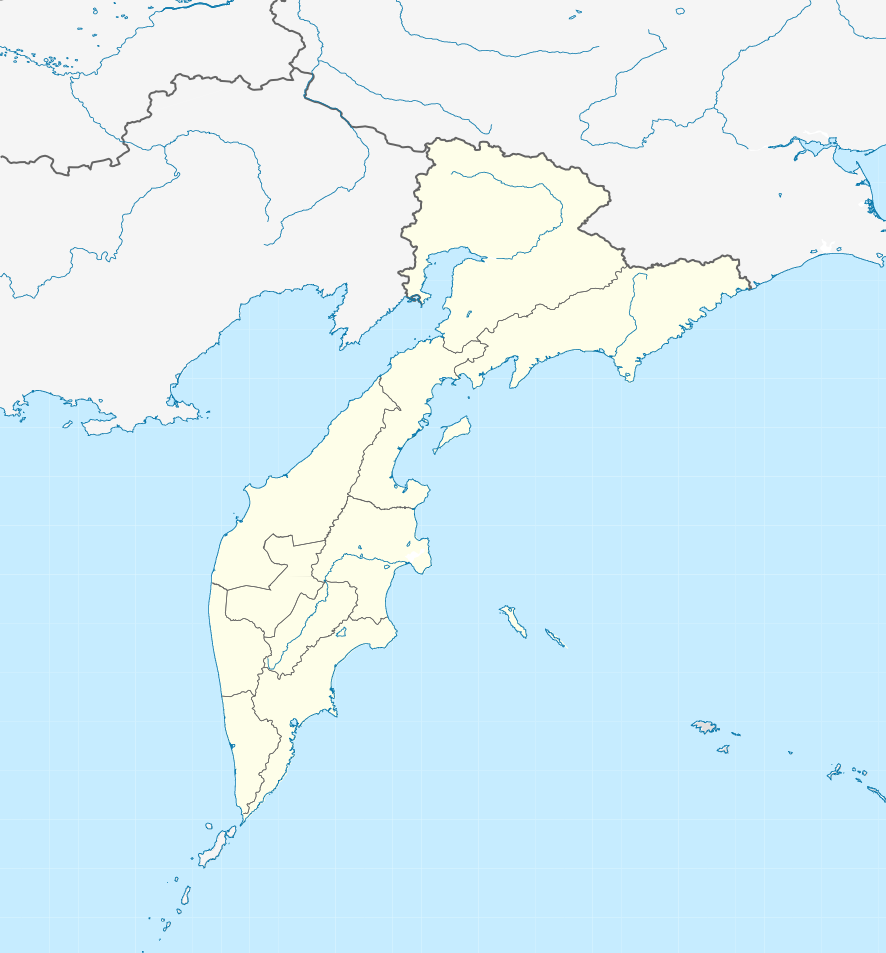
- Location of Kikhchik Kikhchik (Kamchatka Krai)
- Coordinates: 53°25′15″N 156°02′25″E
- Country: Russia
- Federal subject: Kamchatka Krai
- Administrative district: Ust-Bolsheretsky District
- Founded: 1926
- Elevation: 4 m (13 ft)

Kikhchik (Russian: Кихчик) is a former urban-type settlement in Ust-Bolsheretsky District, Kamchatka Krai, Far East Russia. It lies on the southwest coast of the Kamchatka Peninsula on the Sea of Okhotsk. Established in 1926 on the river Kikhchik, a fish canning factory was built by the Soviets here and it attained town status in 1940. Kikhchik had a secondary school, two elementary schools, a hospital, a club, a nursery, a kindergarten, three libraries, a canteen, a bakery, a bathhouse, 6 shops and 3 stalls, and an agricultural farm. By 1959 it had a population of 2606, which had declined to 709 by 1970. On August 28, 1972, the settlement of Kikhchik was abandoned.
