= 2024 Kamchatka Mil Mi-8 crash =

2024 aviation accident in Kamchatka, Russia

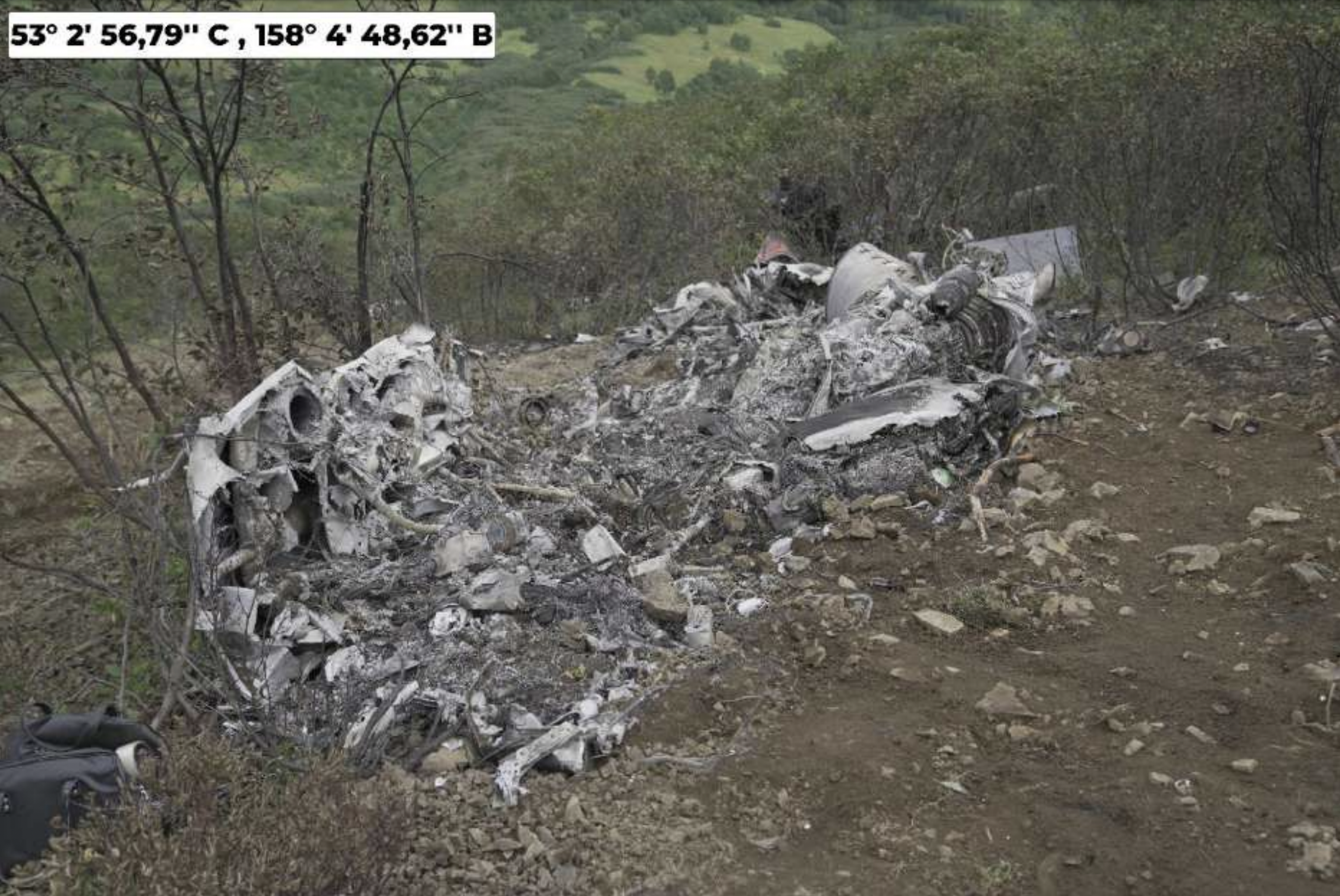
- The wreckage of the aircraft

Accident
- Date: 31 August 2024
- Summary: Crashed in poor weather conditions
- Site: near the Vachkazhets Volcano, Yelizovsky District, Russia; 53°02′56.79″N 158°04′48.62″E

Aircraft
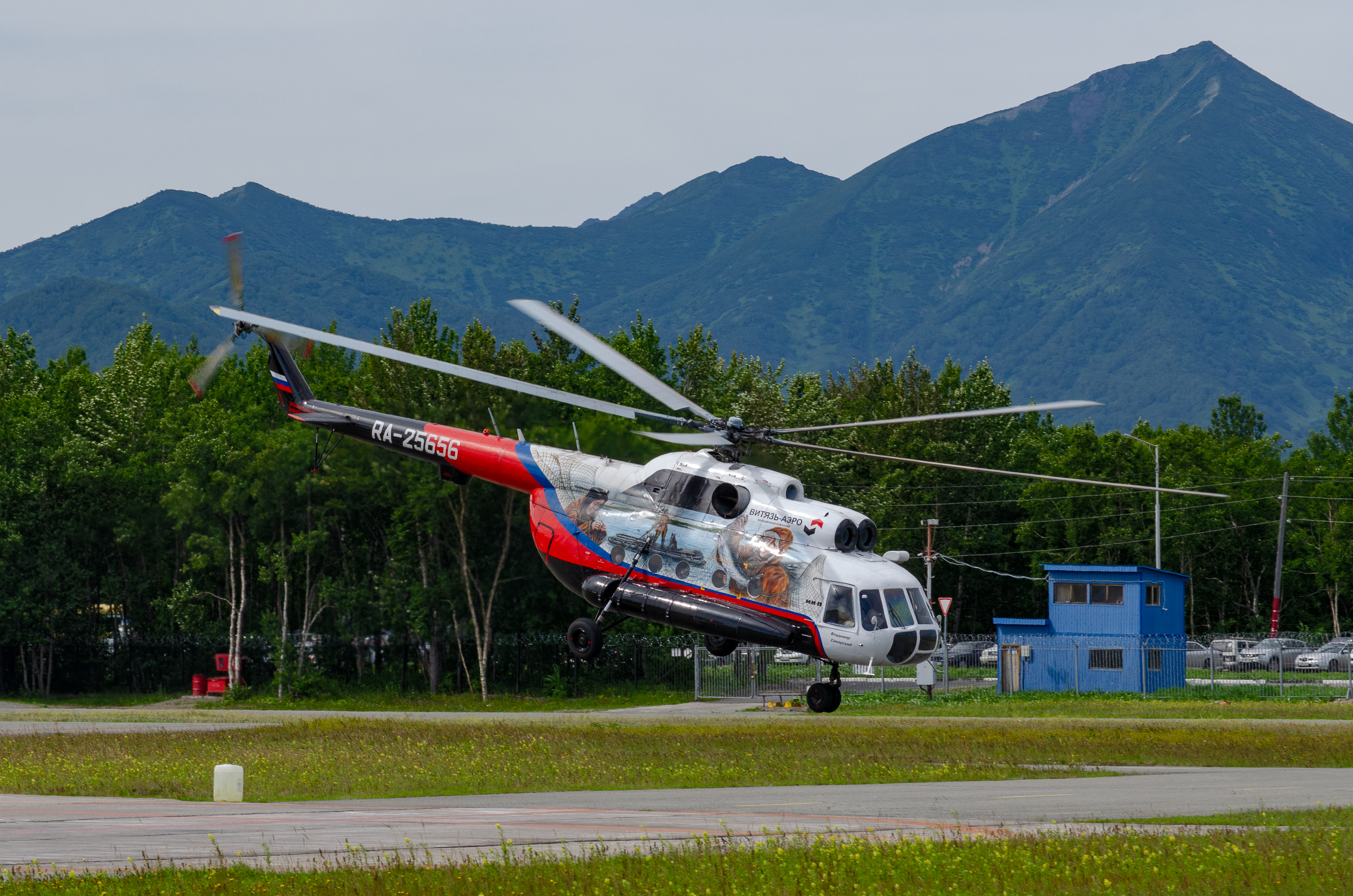
- RA-25656, the aircraft involved in the accident
- Aircraft type: Mil Mi-8T
- Aircraft name: Vladimir Samarsky
- Operator: Vityaz-Aero
- Registration: RA-25656
- Flight origin: Near Vachkazhets volcano, Kamchatka Krai, Russia
- Destination: Nikolayevka, Kamchatka Krai, Russia
- Occupants: 22
- Passengers: 19
- Crew: 3
- Fatalities: 22
- Survivors: 0

On 31 August 2024, a Mil Mi-8 helicopter operating a scheduled charter flight crashed in Kamchatka Krai, Russia, killing all 22 people on board. The aircraft, which was operated by Vityaz-Aero on a sightseeing tour over the Vachkazhets volcano, crashed in poor weather shortly after take-off.

== Background ==
=== Aircraft ===
The aircraft was a 32-year-old Mil Mi-8T, registered as RA-25656 with serial number 99254295; it was manufactured in 1992. The aircraft was operated by Vityaz-Aero, a firm that organises flights for tourists in the area. The aircraft had 4,492 flying hours. The helicopter was powered by two Klimov TV2-117A engines.

Vityaz-Aero had acquired the aircraft 11 years prior, naming it after local helicopter pilot Vladimir Samarsky. On 1 March 2022, the aircraft had received an air operator's certificate due to last for six years, expiring on 17 February 2028. According to the CEO of Vityaz-Aero, Viktor Sirotin, the aircraft was in good working order.

=== Passengers and crew ===
There were 19 passengers on board the flight returning from a trip to the extinct Vachkazhets volcano that had been organized by the Kamchatka Freeride Community and Moscow-based tour operator company Bolshaya Strana. Among those on board was Arseny Zamyatin, the chief financial officer of the Russian Football Union; his wife, Polina Zamyatina; Kirill Seregin, one of the leaders of the Kamchatka Freeride Community, a locally well-known extreme sports enthusiast as well as an experienced guide, and Mikhail Repnikov and Yulia Repnikova, the founders of Bolshaya Strana. Of the 19 passengers, 18 were Russian citizens and 1 was a Kazakh citizen.

In command was 38-year-old Captain Denis Bleshchik, who had been flying helicopters for 12 years, with more than 5728 hours of flying experience on the Mil Mi-8. A former colleague of Bleshchik said that he had all the necessary permits to fly the aircraft. The first officer was a 23-year-old male who had more than 297 hours of flying experience, all of which were on the Mil Mi-8. The flight engineer was a 29-year-old male who had more than 2328 hours of flying experience, 1726 of which were on the Mil Mi-8.

== Accident ==
The helicopter disappeared from radar at around 16:15 PETT (UTC+12:00) shortly after takeoff. It was due to establish communication at around the same time but failed to do so. No difficulties were reported by the crew before the disappearance. Eyewitnesses stated that despite the poor weather, the aircraft still took off. Weather officials said that there was poor visibility in the area where it took off. The Kamchatka Department of Hydrometeorology and Environmental Monitoring reported that fog and drizzle were present in the area of the accident. The wreckage was found in a hilly area at an elevation of 900 metres (3,000 ft) near the point of the last communication, about 20 kilometres (12 mi) from its destination at Nikolayevka, Yelizovsky District.

=== Recovery operations ===
A search operation by the Russian Ministry of Emergency Situations was launched. The focus of operations was the Bystraya River valley, which was on the helicopter's flight path. Operations, which were conducted during a cyclone, were hindered by fog and rain. Two Vityaz-Aero Mil Mi-8s were deployed to search for the missing aircraft. On 1 September, the ministry reported that the accident site had been found with all 22 occupants presumed dead. It also reported that 17 bodies had been recovered from the site with the search still underway. The search was suspended overnight due to the onset of darkness. The ministry later confirmed that all 22 occupants had been killed. On 2 September, the ministry reported that the bodies of all 22 on board had been found and transferred to the forensic examination authorities in Petropavlovsk-Kamchatsky, with the search and rescue operation being announced as completed. In total, 39 people, 14 units of equipment, 4 Mil Mi-8s, and 1 Antonov An-26 – equipped with a cell phone locator – were involved in the search and rescue.

== Aftermath ==
The Governor of Kamchatka Krai, Vladimir Solodov declared 3 September to be a day of mourning in honour of the victims, and expressed his condolences to the families of the victims. On 13 September, the founders of Vityaz-Aero dismissed CEO Viktor Sirotin as a result of the accident with Dmitry Zadirey, Deputy CEO for Flight Operations, also having been decided to be dismissed. In September, an inspection of the airline by Rosaviatsiya and the Federal Service for Supervision of Transport had uncovered a dozen of violations at the airline. The inspection had found that the airline's 63 pilots hadn't undergone the necessary training for flying and that more than half of the airline's fleet had not been properly maintained to meet up with airworthiness requirements. Flights carried out on three helicopters were deemed operationally dangerous, with 46 defects having been found. Aircraft maintenance was conducted by unauthorized personnel without proper equipment and documentation. Ten aviation accidents and incidents were concealed and 17 pilots had worked overtime. The inspection resulted in the suspension of multiple flights, in addition to the suspension of 50 employees from engineering and aviation services, along with the prohibition of operation on eight aircraft. As a result, Rosaviatsia revoked the airline's air operator's certificate.

== Investigation ==
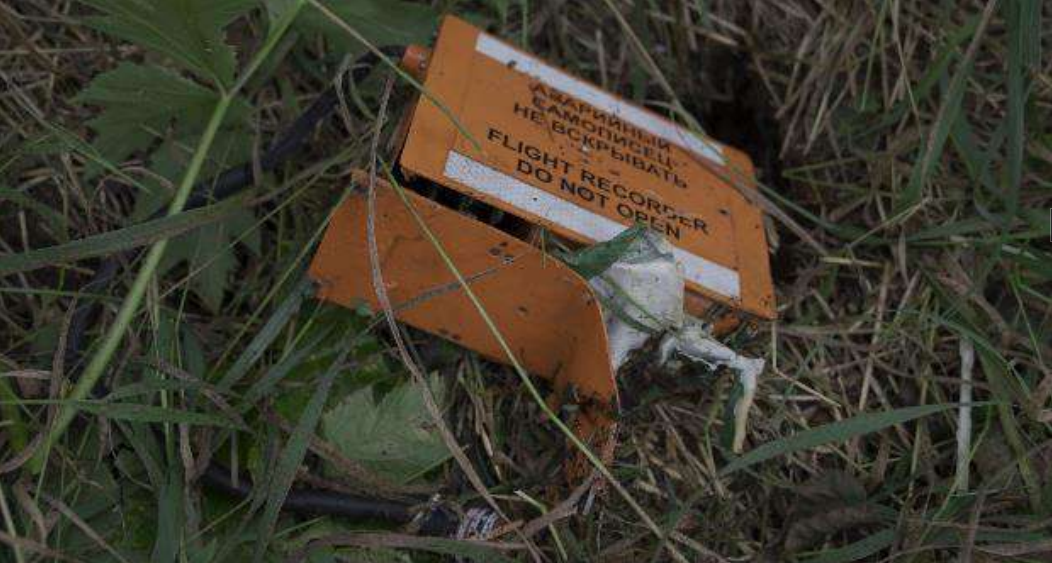
One of the Helicopter's flight Recorder was found somewhere within the accident site

On 1 September, the Interstate Aviation Committee (IAC), informed of the accident by the Kamchatka MTU (Note: An interregional territorial administration.) of Rosaviatsia at 20:19, launched an investigation into the accident, along with Rosaviatsia. The local branch of the Investigative Committee of Russia (ICRF) opened a criminal case under Part 3 of Article 263 of the Criminal Code of the Russian Federation on the violation of traffic safety rules and operation of air transport resulting through negligence in the deaths of two or more persons. The ICRF said that pilot error or a technical malfunction were possible causes of the accident.

On 2 September, the flight data recorder (FDR), and the GPS navigator were recovered. It was later announced that the cockpit voice recorder (CVR) had also been found, but reportedly in a damaged state. Both recorders were sent to the IAC for analysis.

The IAC's preliminary report found that the poor weather conditions present at the time of the accident, coupled with the crew's lack of preparedness for the flight in instrument meteorological conditions could have been key factors.

In March 2025, the IAC determined in their final report that the helicopter had crashed into terrain in low visibility due to its flight into instrument meteorological conditions (IMC) contrary to the ATC, the pilot's decision to descend into mountainous terrain in IMC conditions, and Vityaz-Aero's shortcoming in ensuring flight safety.

== See also ==
- 2020 Calabasas helicopter crash
