= Vulkanny =

Vulkanny Вулканный
- Urban locality
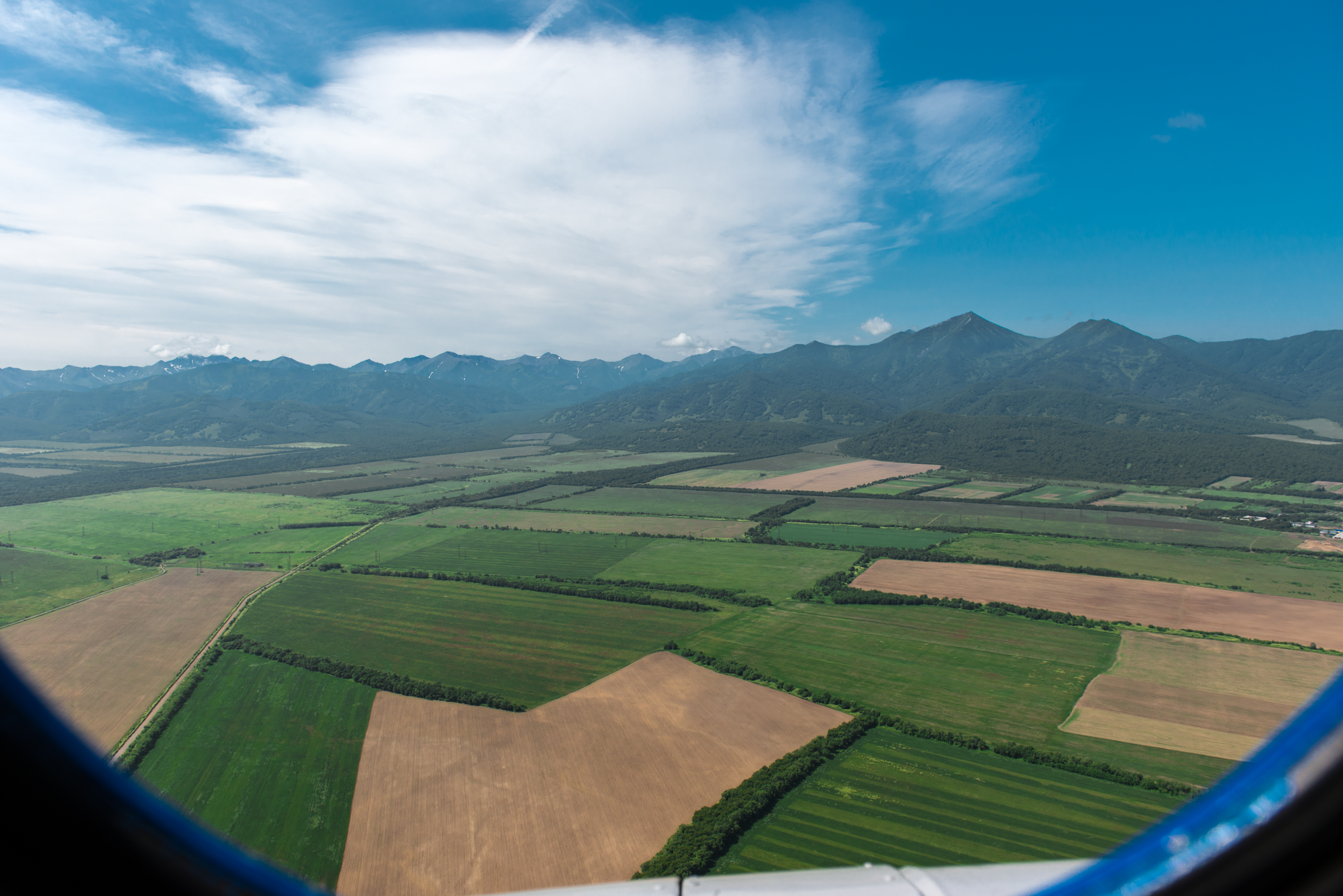
- A photo of fields in the locality.
- Interactive map of Vulkanny
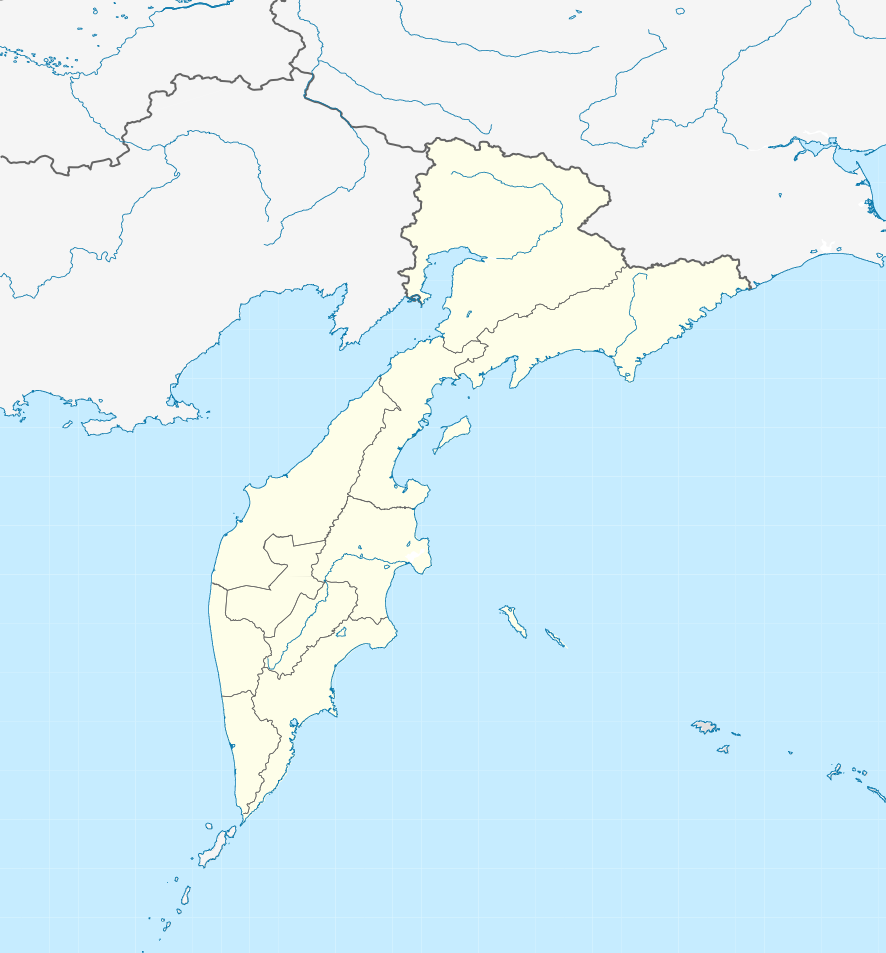
- Location of Vulkanny Vulkanny (Kamchatka Krai)
- Coordinates: 53°05′45″N 158°21′00″E
- Country: Russia
- Federal subject: Kamchatka Krai
- Administrative district: Yelizovsky District
- Founded: 1955

Population (2010 Census)
  - Total: 1,608
  - Estimate (2023): 1,354 (−15.8%)
- Time zone: UTC+12 (MSK+9)
- Postal code: 684036
- Dialing code: +7 41531
- OKTMO ID: 30607154051

Vulkanny (Russian: Вулканный) is an urban locality (an urban-type settlement) in Yelizovsky District of Kamchatka Krai, Russia. Population: 1,608 (2010 census); 1,601 (2002 census);

== History ==
Formed in 1955 as a military townlet, Vulkanny was originally known as the settlement of Mirny (Russian: Мирный). From March 10, 1969, it was renamed Petropavlovsk-Kamchatsky-35.

After the collapse of the Soviet Union in 1992, the settlement was granted closed administrative-territorial entity (ZATO) status. Later in 4 April, 1994, the village had been renamed to the current name, Vulkanny. Since 1999, the closed administrative-territorial entity of Vulkanny was abolished.
