= Nachikinskoe =

Nachikinskoe Начикинское сельское поселение
- Rural settlement
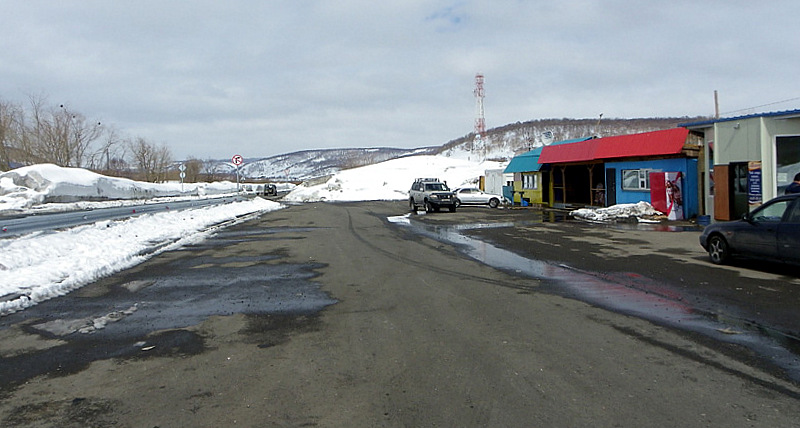
- Sokoch

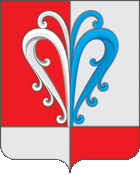
- Coat of arms

- Location in Kamchatka Krai
- Coordinates: 53.152883°N 157.691541°E
- Country: Russia
- Federal subject: Kamchatka Krai
- District: Yelizovsky

Area
  - Total: 235.2242 km^{2} (90.8206 sq mi)
- Time zone: UTC12

Nachikinskoe (Russian: Начикинское), or Nachikinskoye, Nachikinsky, is a rural settlement in the Yelizovsky District of Kamchatka Krai, Russia. The administrative center is the village of Sokoch.

== History ==
The villages of Nachiki and Malka were part of the Milkovsky District, but communication with Milkovo was difficult, since it was 200 kilometres (120 mi) away. A highway built from Petropavlovsk-Kamchatsky towards the village of Nachiki improved communications, and on 5 September 1944 Milka and Nachiki were transferred to the administrative region of the city of Petropavlovsk-Kamchatsky. On 12 February 1956 a general meeting was attended by 64 of the 72 adults who lived in the Malka village. It was decided to abolish the Malkinsky Village Council and make Malka part of the Nachikinsky Village Council.

Sokoch is the administrative centrer of Nachikinsky and lies 66.6 kilometres (41.4 mi) by road west of Yelizovo. The settlement was established in 1947 on the Plotnikova River. In the early 1970s, the main Kamchatka road connected Petropavlovsk-Kamchatsky, first with the district center of Milkovo, and then with Atlasovo and the Ust-Kamchatsky District. Most of the road runs between the Eastern and Sredinny (or Middle) ranges. It crosses many rivers and streams along its length.

The present status and boundaries of the rural settlement were established by the Law of Kamchatka Region dated December 29, 2004 No. 255 "On Establishing the Borders of Municipalities Located in the Yelizovsky District of the Kamchatka Region, and on Giving them the Status of a Municipal District, Urban, and Rural Settlement". It covers an area of 235 square kilometres (91 sq mi). The distance by road to the regional center is 94 kilometres (58 mi).

== Population ==
The Russian Census (2010) determined that the population of the rural settlement was 1304. This was divided between five villages:

Village		Population
Ganally	Ганалы	2
Dalniy	Дальний	61
Malki	Малки	23
Nachiki	Начики	315
Sokoch	Сокоч	903

As of 2018 the population was 1265.

== Lake ==
The rural settlement contains the glacier-fed Nachikinskoye Lake (Ozero Nachikinskoye), the source of the Plotnikova River. The lake is 7 kilometres (4.3 mi) from the village of Nachiki, set high in the mountains, and is a local tourist attraction. It is an important spawning ground for sockeye salmon, coho salmon and pink salmon. During the spawning period the plentiful fish attract many brown bears. A study of charrs of the genus Salvelinus in the lake showed that two populations of closely related but morphologically distinct sympatric charrs can stably coexist in the lake.

== Sources ==
- 2010 All-Russian Population Census (PDF)
- Borisov, Viktor (2008), "Мalka (part 2)", Gazeta Vesti (in Russian), archived from the original on 2007-12-15
- "Nachikinskoe" (Map). Google Maps.
- Начикинское сельское поселение (Nachikinskoe rural settlement) (in Russian), Kamchatka Krai
- "Nachikinskoye Lake", Baikal Nature
- On establishing the boundaries of municipalities located in the territory of the Yelizovsky district of the Kamchatka region ... as amended on December 4, 2017 (in Russian), Kamchatka Region, 29 December 2004
- Senchukova, A. L.; Pavlov, S. D.; Esin, E. V.; Markevich, G. N.; Mugue, N. S. (January 2015), "Charrs of the genus Salvelinus from Nachikinskoe Lake (Kamchatka Peninsula) and their position in the phylogenetic system of the S. alpinus-S. malma complex", Journal of Ichthyology, 55 (1): 97–104, doi:10.1134/S003294521501018X, S2CID 206839452
- Сокоч (in Russian), Nasledie-sela.ru, archived from the original on 5 February 2020
