= Ust-Bolsheretsk =

Selo in Ust-Bolsheretsky District, Kamchatka Krai, Russia

Ust-Bolsheretsk Усть-Большерецк
- Selo
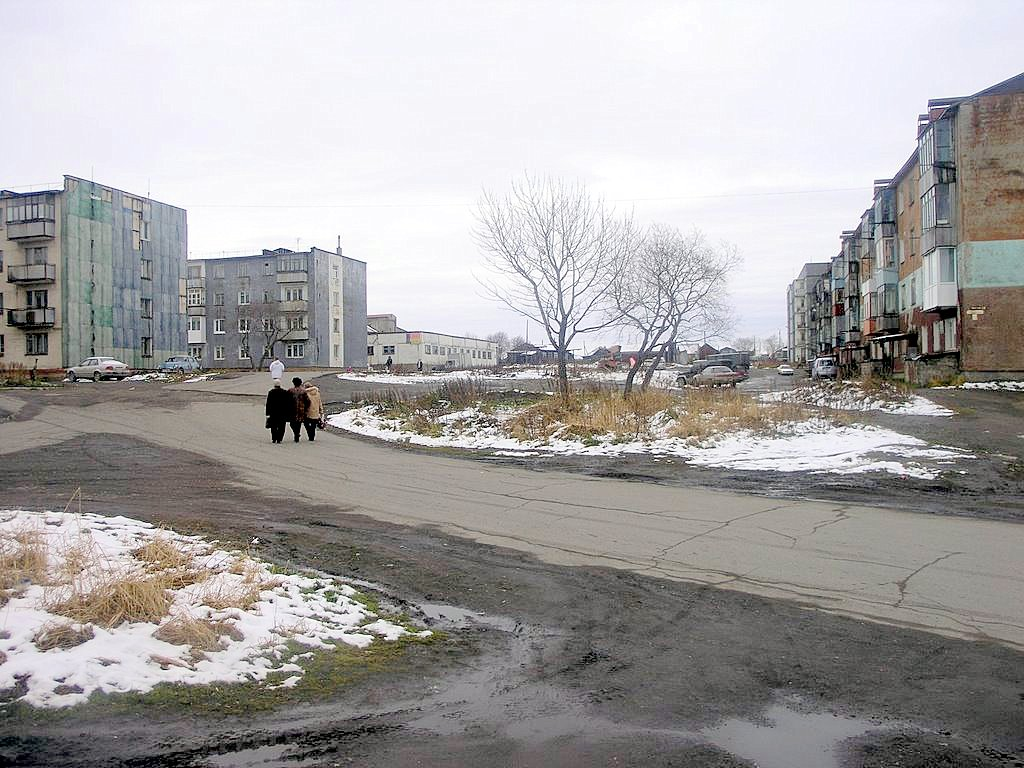
- Buildings of Ust-Bolsheretsk

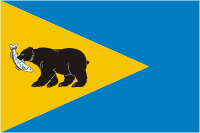
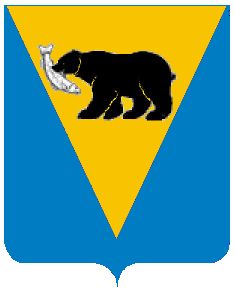
- Flag Coat of arms
- Interactive map of Ust-Bolsheretsk
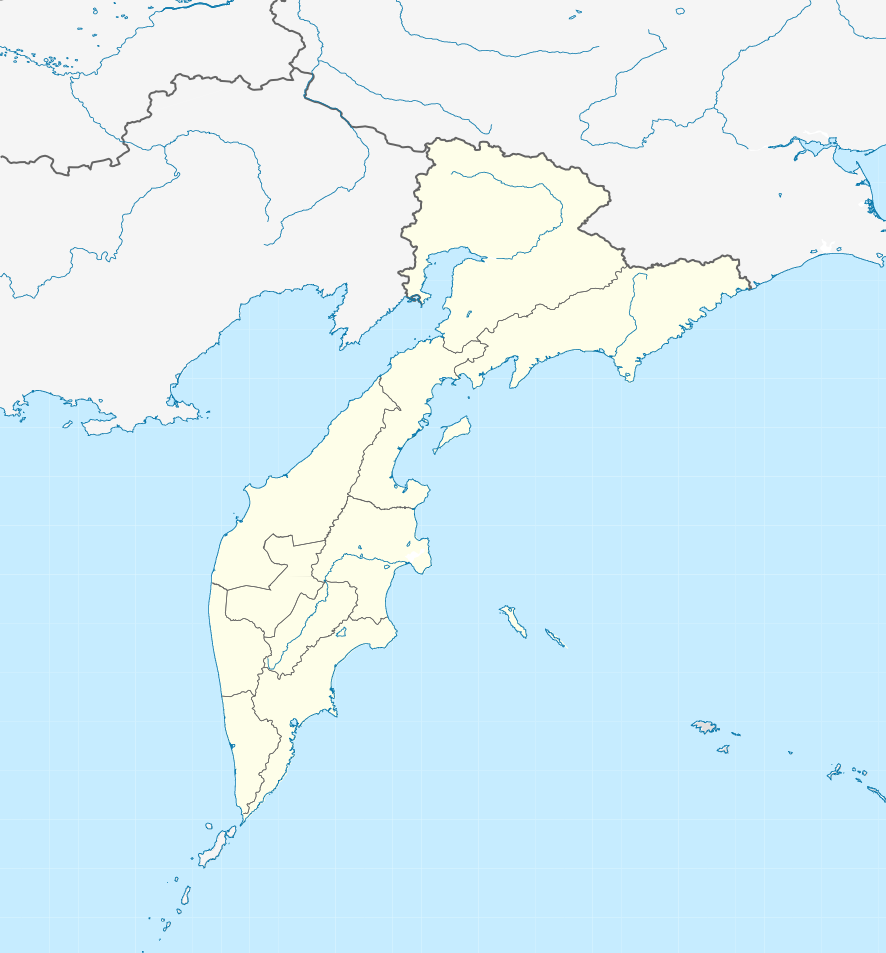
- Location of Ust-Bolsheretsk Ust-Bolsheretsk (Kamchatka Krai)
- Coordinates: 52°49′30″N 156°16′50″E
- Country: Russia
- Federal subject: Kamchatka Krai
- Administrative district: Ust-Bolsheretsky District
- Founded: 1911

Population (2010 Census)
  - Total: 2,116
  - Estimate (2023): 1,450 (−31.5%)

Municipal status
  - Capital of: Ust-Bolsheretsky District
- Time zone: UTC+12 (MSK+9)
- Postal code: 684100
- OKTMO ID: 30616410101

Ust-Bolsheretsk (Russian: Усть-Большерецк) is a rural locality (a selo) and the administrative center of Ust-Bolsheretsky District, Kamchatka Krai, Russia. Population: 2,116 (2010 census); 2,277 (2002 census); 3,075 (1989 Soviet census).

== History ==
The village was founded in an area known as Khaikova Pad' (Russian: Хайкова Падь), situated near where the Khaikovskiy Stream meets the Amchagacha River. In 1910, work commenced on a radio telegraph line along the pre-existing country road, and by 1911, a post and telegraph station, along with several residences for line maintenance workers and the western coast fisheries supervision service, were constructed within Ust-Bolsheretsk. The regional newspaper "Udarnik" was first published in 1932. In 1953, there were intentions to initiate the construction of a railway connecting these settlements; however, following Joseph Stalin's death, these plans were abandoned on 21 March, 1953. The dirt road from Petropavlovsk to Ust-Bolsheretsk was opened in 1972.
