= Yelizovo =

Town in Kamchatka Krai, Russia

Yelizovo Елизово
- Town
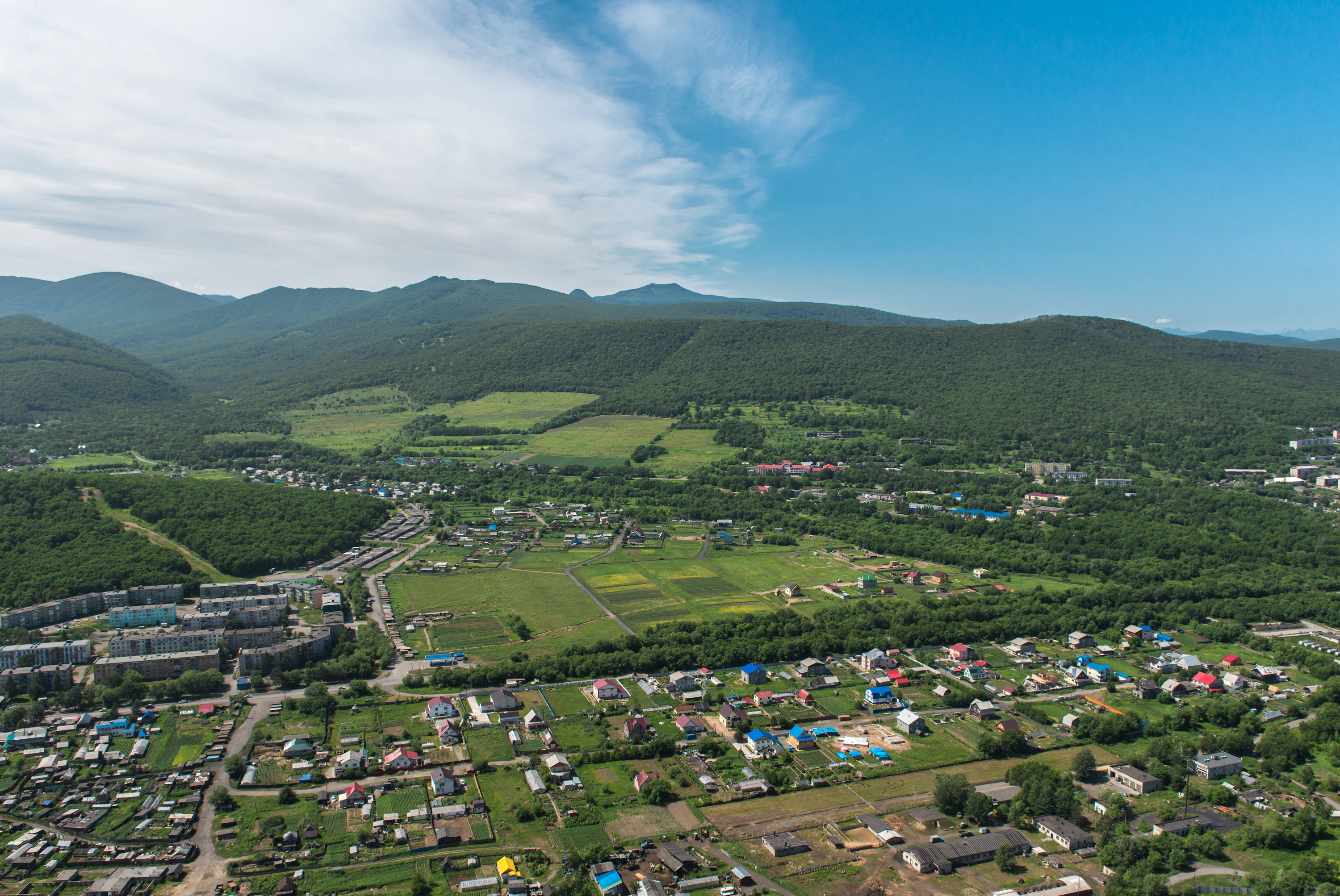
- View of Yelizovo

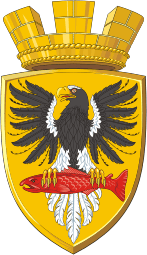
- Flag Coat of arms
- Interactive map of Yelizovo
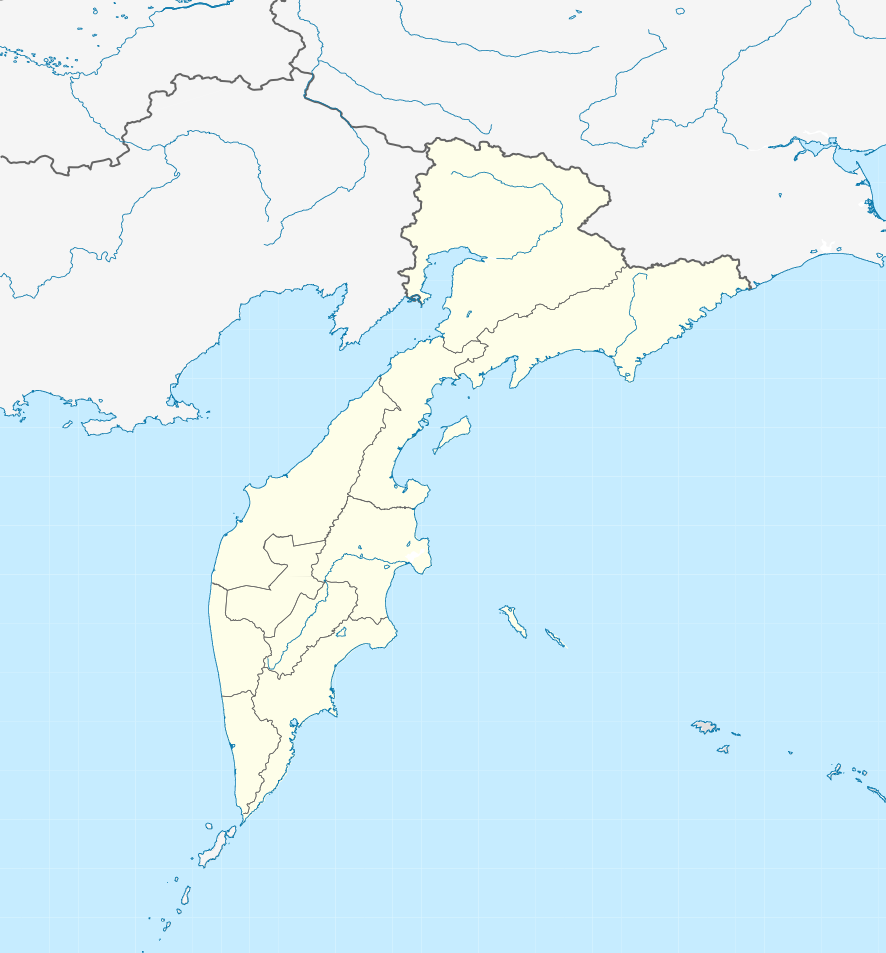
- Location of Yelizovo Yelizovo (Kamchatka Krai)
- Coordinates: 53°11′N 158°23′E
- Country: Russia
- Federal subject: Kamchatka Krai
- Founded: 1848
- Town status since: 1975
- Elevation: 20 m (66 ft)

Population (2010 Census)
  - Total: 39,569
  - Estimate (2023): 36,199 (−8.5%)

Administrative status
  - Subordinated to: Yelizovo Town Under Krai Jurisdiction
  - Capital of: Yelizovo Town Under Krai Jurisdiction

Municipal status
  - Municipal district: Yelizovsky Municipal District
  - Urban settlement: Yelizovskoye Urban Settlement
  - Capital of: Yelizovsky Municipal District, Yelizovskoye Urban Settlement
- Time zone: UTC+12 (MSK+9)
- Postal code: 684000
- OKTMO ID: 30607101001
- Website: admelizovo.ru

Yelizovo (Russian: Е́лизово) is a town in Kamchatka Krai, Russia, located on the Avacha River 32 kilometers (20 mi) northwest of Petropavlovsk-Kamchatsky with a population of 39,569 (2010 census);

== History ==
Founded in 1848 as the selo of Stary Ostrog (Ста́рый Остро́г), it was renamed Zavoyko (Заво́йко) in 1897, after the Russian admiral Vasily Zavoyko who led the defense of Petropavlovsk in 1854. The village was renamed Yelizovo in 1924. Urban-type settlement status was granted to it in 1964, and town status was granted in 1975.

== Administrative and municipal status ==
Within the framework of administrative divisions, Yelizovo serves as the administrative center of Yelizovsky District, even though it is not a part of it. As an administrative division, it is incorporated as Yelizovo Town Under Krai Jurisdiction—an administrative unit with the status equal to that of the districts. As a municipal division, Yelizovo Town Under Krai Jurisdiction is incorporated as Yelizovskoye Urban Settlement within Yelizovsky Municipal District.

== Demographics ==
Ethnic composition (2010):

- Russians – 89.4%
- Ukrainians – 3.5%
- Koreans – 1.5%
- Tatars – 0.6%
- Belarusians – 0.6%
- Others – 4.4%

The town has a small population of Korean people who were descended from North Korean contract workers from 1946.

== Transportation and infrastructure ==
The town's most notable claim to fame is serving as the host for Petropavlovsk-Kamchatsky Airport, the largest airport on Kamchatka. A major Soviet space telemetry station, NIP-6, was also located nearby.

In Yelizovo, there is a long-wave broadcasting station with a 255 metres (837 ft) tall ARRT-Antenna.
