= Yelizovsky District =

Yelizovsky District Елизовский район (Russian)
- District
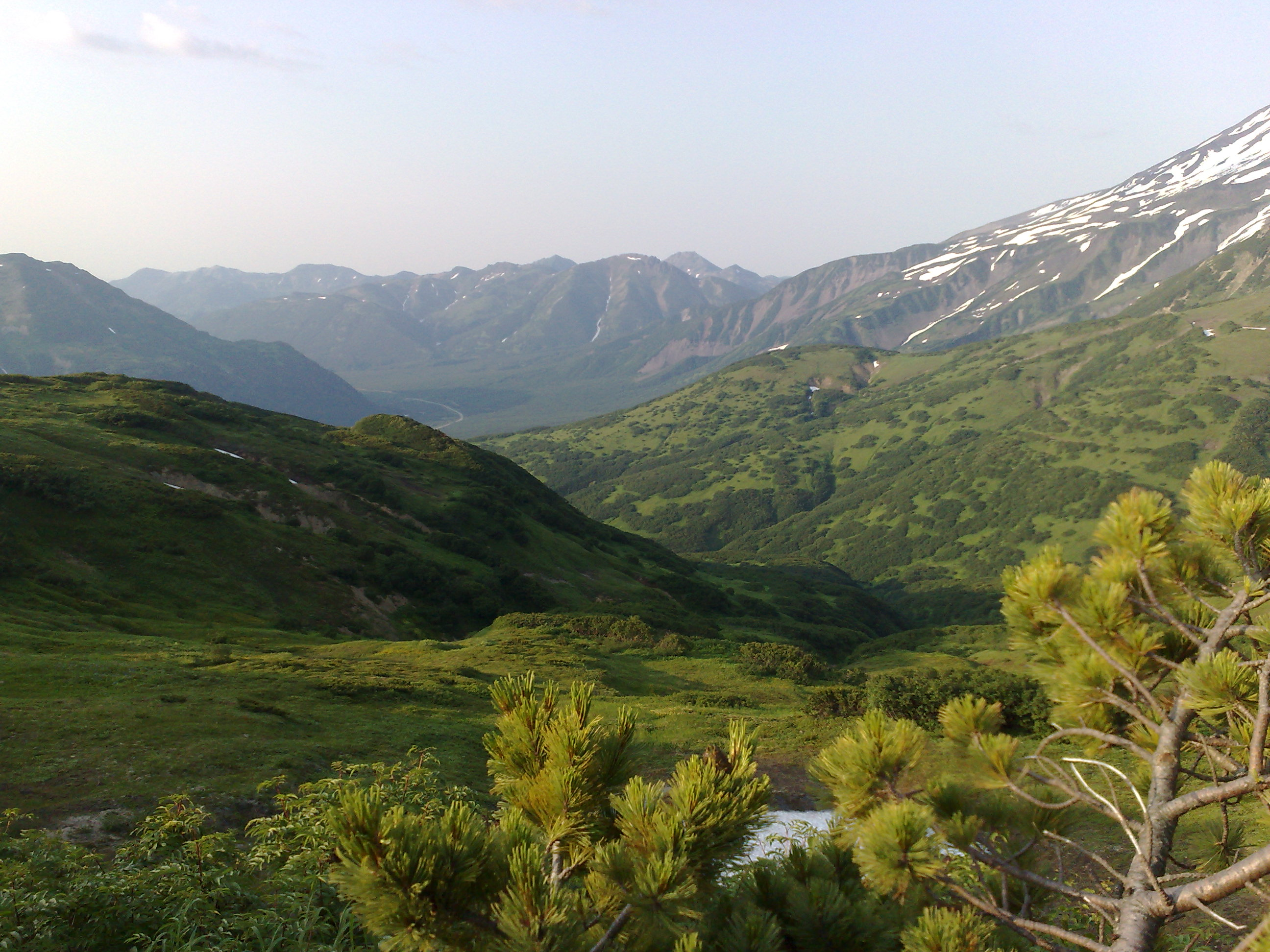
- Road to Mutnovsky Glacier in Yelizovsky District

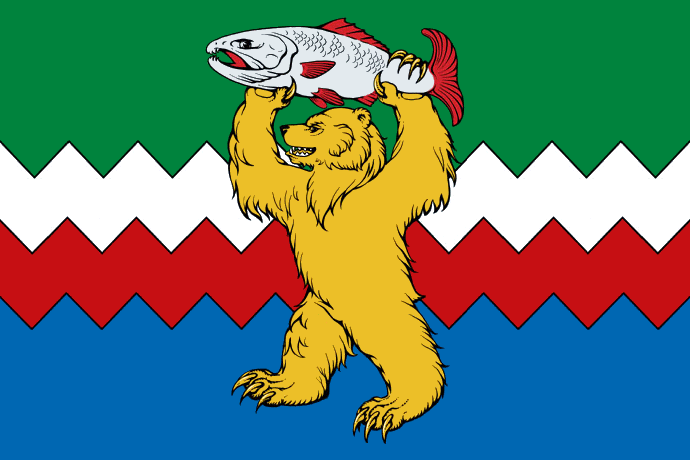
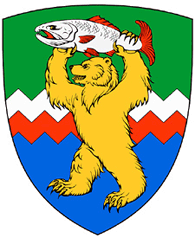
- Flag Coat of arms
- Location of Yelizovsky District in Kamchatka Krai
- Coordinates: 53°12′N 158°24′E
- Country: Russia
- Federal subject: Kamchatka Krai
- Established: November 17, 1949
- Administrative center: Yelizovo

Area
  - Total: 40,996.4 km^{2} (15,828.8 sq mi)

Population (2010 Census)
  - Total: 24,566
  - Density: 0.59922/km^{2} (1.5520/sq mi)
  - Urban: 6.5%
  - Rural: 93.5%

Administrative structure
  - Inhabited localities: 1 urban-type settlements, 25 rural localities

Municipal structure
  - Municipally incorporated as: Yelizovsky Municipal District
  - Municipal divisions: 2 urban settlements, 8 rural settlements
- Time zone: UTC+12 (MSK+9)
- OKTMO ID: 30607000

Population of Yelizovsky District
- 2010 Census: 24,566
- 2002 Census: 24,086
- 1989 Census: 28,720
- 1979 Census: 19,267

Yelizovsky District (Russian: Ели́зовский райо́н) is an administrative and municipal district (raion) of Kamchatka Krai, Russia, one of the eleven in the krai. It is located in the south of the krai. The area of the district is 40,996.4 square kilometers (15,828.8 sq mi). Its administrative center is the town of Yelizovo (which is not administratively a part of the district). As of the 2010 Census, the total population of the district was 24,566.

== Administrative and municipal status ==
Within the framework of administrative divisions, Yelizovsky District is one of the eleven in the krai. The town of Yelizovo serves as its administrative center, despite being incorporated separately as a town under krai jurisdiction—an administrative unit with the status equal to that of the districts.

As a municipal division, the district is incorporated as Yelizovsky Municipal District, with Yelizovo Town Under Krai Jurisdiction being incorporated within it as Yelizovskoye Urban Settlement.

== Subdivisions ==
Division	Type	Administrative center	2018 population
Vulkanny	Urban settlement	Vulkanny	1508
Yelizovo	Urban settlement	Yelizovo	39,216
Koryaki	Rural settlement	Koryaki	3656
Nachikinskoe	Rural settlement	Sokoch	1265
Nikolayevka	Rural settlement	Nikolayevka^{ru}	2769
Novoavachinskoye	Rural settlement	Novy^{ru}	3877
Novolesnovskoe	Rural settlement	Lesnoy^{ru}	1653
Paratunka	Rural settlement	Paratunka^{ru}	3606
Pionersky	Rural settlement	Pionersky^{ru}	3879
Razdolny	Rural settlement	Razdolny^{ru}	2774

== Demographics ==
Ethnic composition (2010):

- Russians – 89.3%
- Ukrainians – 3.5%
- Koreans – 1.1%
- Tatars – 0.7%
- Others – 5.4%
