= Ust-Bolsheretsky District =

Kamchatkan district

Ust-Bolsheretsky District Усть-Большерецкий район (Russian)
- District
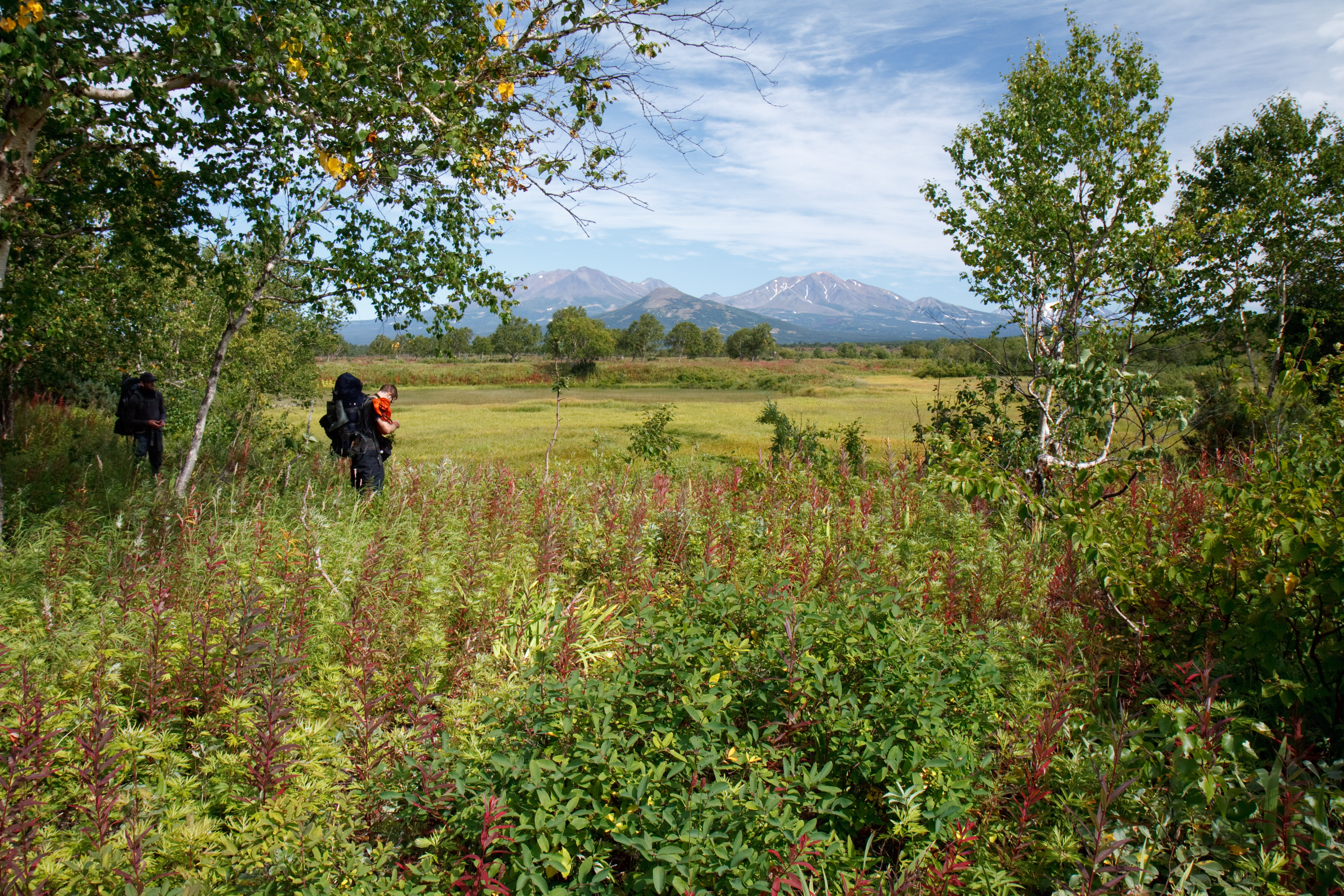
- Lesotundra, Ust-Bolsheretsky District

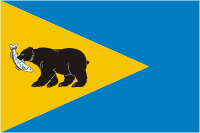
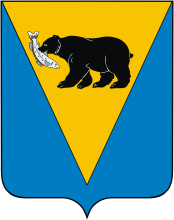
- Flag Coat of arms
- Location of Ust-Bolsheretsky District in Kamchatka Krai
- Coordinates: 52°49′30″N 156°16′45″E
- Country: Russia
- Federal subject: Kamchatka Krai
- Established: 1 April 1926
- Administrative center: Ust-Bolsheretsk

Area
  - Total: 20,626 km^{2} (7,964 sq mi)

Population (2010 Census)
  - Total: 8,331
  - Density: 0.4039/km^{2} (1.046/sq mi)
  - Urban: 0%
  - Rural: 100%

Administrative structure
  - Inhabited localities: 9 rural localities

Municipal structure
  - Municipally incorporated as: Ust-Bolsheretsky Municipal District
  - Municipal divisions: 2 urban settlements, 4 rural settlements
- Time zone: UTC+12 (MSK+9)
- OKTMO ID: 30616000
- Website: http://www.ubmr.ru/

Ust-Bolsheretsky District (Russian: Усть-Большере́цкий райо́н) is an administrative and municipal district (rayon) of Kamchatka Krai, Russia, one of the eleven in the krai. It is located in the southern and southwestern parts of the krai. The area of the district is 20,626 square kilometers (7,964 sq mi). Its administrative center is the rural locality (a selo) of Ust-Bolsheretsk. Population: 8,331 (2010 census); 10,347 (2002 census); 14,188 (1989 Soviet census). The population of Ust-Bolsheretsk accounts for 25.4% of the district's total population.
