= History of Russian exploration =

Exploration by Russian subjects

The history of exploration by citizens or subjects of the Russian Federation, the Soviet Union, the Russian Empire, the Tsardom of Russia and other Russian predecessor states forms a significant part of the history of Russia as well as the history of the world. At 17,075,400 square kilometres (6,592,850 sq mi), Russia is the largest country in the world, covering more than a ninth of Earth's landmass. In the times of the Soviet Union and the Russian Empire, the country's share in the world's landmass reached 1/6. Most of these territories were first discovered by Russian explorers (if indigenous peoples of inhabited territories are not counted). Contiguous exploration in Eurasia and the building of overseas colonies in Russian America were some of the primary factors in Russian territorial expansion.

Apart from their discoveries in Alaska, Central Asia, Siberia, and the northern areas surrounding the North Pole, Russian explorers have made significant contributions to the exploration of the Antarctic, Arctic, and the Pacific islands, as well as deep-sea and space explorations.

== Before 1000 CE ==
By the tenth century, the northern part of the East European Plain and its Baltic and White Sea coasts were settled by tribes of East Slavic, Baltic, and Finnic peoples. The first historical exploration of the region was conducted by Norse Varangians, who established the principalities of Rus. After the dissolution of that polity, the Grand Duchy of Moscow would eventually collect most of the lands of European Russia starting from the 13th century.

== 1000–1500 ==
From the 11th century on, a group of Russians which settled the shores of the White Sea and became known as Pomors ("seaside-dwellers") began navigating in the freezing seas of the Arctic Ocean, gradually developing the first icebreaking ships known as kochi. As early as the 11th century Russians from the Novgorod Republic had occasionally penetrated into Siberia. In the 14th century the Novgorodians started exploring the Kara Sea and the West Siberian Ob River. Russians were among those rare medieval Europeans who traveled deep into Central Asia or visited South Asia. Prince Yaroslav II of Vladimir and his sons Alexander Yaroslavich Nevsky and Andrey Yaroslavich traveled to Karakorum, the capital of the Mongolian Empire in the 1240s, while Afanasy Nikitin, a merchant from the Principality of Tver, traveled to Persia and India in A Journey Beyond the Three Seas in 1466–1472.

== 1500–1700 ==
By the beginning of the Age of Discovery, many of the former principalities of Kievan Rus were integrated by the Grand Duchy of Moscow. Proclaimed the Tsardom of Russia, by the end of the 16th century the state had colonized the easternmost territories of Europe by conquering the Khanate of Kazan in 1552 and the Khanate of Astrakhan in 1556, thus gaining full control of the Volga River valley. The road to Asia was opened, and in 1581 Yermak Timofeyevich crossed the Ural Mountains with a band of adventurers, defeated the Siberian Khanate and started the Russian conquest of Siberia.

The rapid exploration of the vast territories of Siberia was led primarily by Cossacks and Pomors hunting for valuable furs, spices and ivory. Explorers such as Pyanda, Pyotr Beketov, Kurbat Ivanov, Ivan Moskvitin, Vasily Poyarkov and Yerofey Khabarov pushed eastward mostly along the Siberian River Routes, and by the mid-17th century there were Russian settlements in Eastern Siberia, on the Chukchi Peninsula, along the Amur River, and on the Pacific coast. In 1648 the Bering Strait between Asia and North America was passed through for the first time by Europeans by Fedot Popov and Semyon Dezhnyov. The journeys of Ivan Petlin and Nicolae Milescu established contacts between Moscow and Ming China. By the early 18th century Russians under Vladimir Atlasov had colonised Kamchatka.

== 1700s ==
=== Mapping expeditions ===
Peter the Great, who turned the country into the Russian Empire in 1721, ordered the first instrumental mapping of Russia, and conceived the Great Northern Expedition, which was carried out after the Emperor's death with Vitus Bering as the leader and main organizer. With over 3,000 people directly and indirectly involved, the expedition was one of the largest exploration enterprises in history by its geographic scale and results. Preceded by Bering's first voyage through the Bering Strait in 1728–1729 and the European discovery of Alaska by Ivan Fyodorov and Mikhail Gvozdev in 1732, the achievements of the expedition included the discovery of the Aleutian Islands and the Commander Islands by Bering and Alexei Chirikov, the mapping of most of the Russian Arctic coastline and part of the Pacific coast in 1733–1743 by teams led by Stepan Malygin, Dmitry Ovtsyn, Fyodor Minin, Semyon Chelyuskin, Vasily Pronchischev, Khariton Laptev and Dmitry Laptev. The Academic Squad of the expedition, composed of the early members of the young Russian Academy of Sciences such as Gerhard Friedrich Müller, Johann Georg Gmelin and Stepan Krasheninnikov, inaugurated the first ethnographic, historic, and scientific research into Siberia and Kamchatka.

=== America ===
The Russian Empire at its peak in 1866. This territory largely corresponds to the extent of contiguous exploration by Russians.

The Russian colonization of the Americas followed in the late 18th and early 19th centuries, through the joint efforts of the state and private enterprises such as the Russian-American Company, led by Grigory Shelikhov, Nikolay Rezanov, Alexander Baranov and others. Russians mapped most of the Alaskan coasts and nearby islands, explored the inner areas of the peninsula, and went as far south as Fort Ross in California.

== 1800s ==
=== Circumnavigation ===
In 1803–06 the first Russian circumnavigation was led by Ivan Kruzenshtern and Yury Lisyansky, partly with the aim of establishing direct marine communications between Saint Petersburg and Russian America. More Russian circumnavigations followed, notably those led by Otto Kotzebue, Ferdinand Wrangel, Vasily Golovnin, and Fyodor Litke. These voyages brought multiple discoveries in Alaska and the Pacific. In 1820–1821 a round-the-world expedition led by Fabian Gottlieb von Bellingshausen and Mikhail Lazarev on sloops Vostok and Mirny discovered the continent of Antarctica.

In the 19th century, the scientific exploration of the inner areas of Siberia intensified. The complex orographic systems of Central and Eastern Siberia were established by such scientists as Alexander Middendorf, Ivan Chersky and Vladimir Obruchev. In the middle of the century, around the time of the Amur Annexation, the Russian government put much effort into exploration and colonization of the Amur River valley, Primorsky Krai and Sakhalin.

=== Conquest of Central Asia ===
The Russian conquest of Central Asia was accompanied by the penetration of many explorers into the depths of Eurasia, including Mongolia, Jungaria and Tibet. Notable explorers in this direction included Chokan Valikhanov, Pyotr Semyonov-Tyan-Shansky, Pyotr Chikhachyov, Nikolay Przhevalsky, Grigory Grum-Grshimailo, Bronislav Grombchevsky and Pyotr Kozlov. Gombojab Tsybikov was the first European explorer in Lhasa, but he travelled by the customary road of Buryat pilgrims.

== 1900s ==
=== Polar exploration ===
The late 19th century and the early 20th century was marked by a renewed interest in Arctic exploration. Many expeditions of that era met a tragic fate, like the voyages of Eduard Toll, Georgy Brusilov, Vladimir Rusanov and Georgy Sedov, yet brought some valuable geographic results. Modern era polar icebreakers, dating from Stepan Makarov's Yermak, made Arctic voyages safer and led to new attempts to explore the Northern Sea Route. The last major unknown archipelago on Earth, Severnaya Zemlya, was discovered by Boris Vilkitsky during his 1913 expedition on the icebreakers Taymyr and Vaygach and later explored and mapped in 1931 by Nikolay Urvantsev and Georgy Ushakov. The Soviet Chief Directorate of the Northern Sea Route under Otto Shmidt completed the exploration of the Russian Arctic and established regular marine communications alongside Russia's northern shores in the 1930s. North Pole-1, the drifting ice station populated by the team led by Ivan Papanin, became the first expedition of its kind in 1937–38, and inaugurated a succession of drifting polar research stations which continues to this day.

During the International Geophysical Year in 1957–1958 the Soviet Union established its presence in the Antarctic, starting a series of Soviet Antarctic Expeditions. The first expeditions, led by Mikhail Somov, Aleksei Treshnikov and Yevgeny Tolstikov, made multiple discoveries in the inner areas of Antarctica and reached the Southern Pole of inaccessibility and the Southern Pole of Cold. At the latter location, on the site of the Vostok Station, the subglacial Lake Vostok, one of the last major geographical discoveries on Earth, was detected deep below the Antarctic ice shield.

=== Space Age ===
In 1957 the Soviet Union opened the Space Age by launching the first Earth-orbiting artificial satellite, Sputnik 1. Many other Soviet and Russian space exploration records ensued: the first human spaceflight performed by Yury Gagarin on Vostok 1 in 1961; the first woman in space, Valentina Tereshkova, in 1963; the first spacewalk by Alexei Leonov in 1965; the first space exploration rover, Lunokhod-1, on the Moon in 1970, and the first space station, Salyut 1, launched in 1971.

The most recent exploration activities by Russians include expeditions on MIR submersibles, notably the investigations of the RMS Titanic and the planting of a Russian flag on the seabed under the North Pole, reached for the first time by the Arktika 2007 expedition led by Artur Chilingarov.

== See also ==
- 1966 Soviet submarine global circumnavigation
- Arctic policy of Russia
- Category:Russian explorers
- First Russian circumnavigation
- Geography of Russia
- Great Northern Expedition
- List of cosmonauts
- List of explorers
- Northern Sea Route
- Russian Geographical Society
- Siberian River Routes
- Soviet Antarctic Expeditions
- Soviet space program
