= Kurbat Ivanov =

Russian explorer (died 1667)

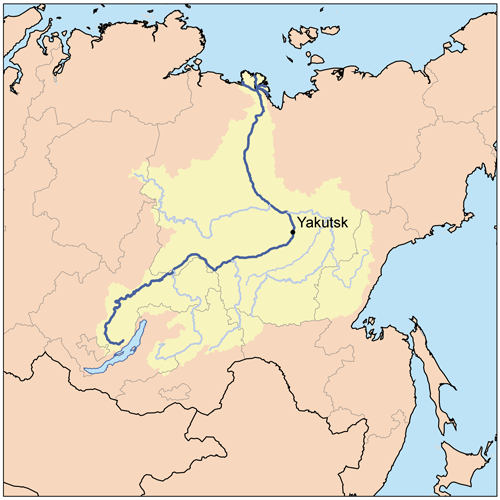
Lena River and Lake Baikal

Kurbat Afanasyevich Ivanov (Russian: Курбат Афанасьевич Иванов; died 1667) was a Cossack explorer of Siberia. He was the first Russian to encounter Lake Baikal, and to create the first map of the Russian Far East. He also is credited with creation of the early map of Chukotka and Bering Strait, which was the first to show (very schematically) the yet undiscovered Wrangel Island, both Diomede Islands and Alaska.

Kurbat Ivanov was born a Yeniseyan Cossack. In 1642 he made the first map of the Russian Far East, based on the explorations of Ivan Moskvitin.

Ivanov came to the Verkholensky ostrog on the Lena River, and taking 74 men with him he sailed south up the river on 21 June 1643, having decided to find if the rumors of large body of water south of the Lena were true. He took with him a Tungus prince Mozheul to assist in finding the way. Through the upper Lena and its tributary the Ilikta they reached Primorsky Ridge, crossed it by foot, and by the Sarma River descended to Lake Baikal near Olkhon Island. Having built new boats, Ivanov sailed to Olkhon.

Ivanov sent 36 men under the leadership of Semyon Skorokhodov to sail along the western shore of Baikal to the mouth of Upper Angara giving them another Tungus prince, called Yunoga, in assistance. Skorokhodov reached the northern tip of Baikal, built a winter settlement there and started to gather tribute from locals. In the end of 1643 Skorokhodov was returning south with the half of his men, but was ambushed by Arkhich Batur (probably a Buryat) and killed with some of his men. Twelve men managed to return to Verkholensky ostrog, while аnother two, named Lyovka Vyatchanin and Maximka Vyzhegchanin, traveled as far as Yeniseysky ostrog by Angara and Yenisey. The latter Cossack later returned to Baikal with ataman V. Kolesnikov.

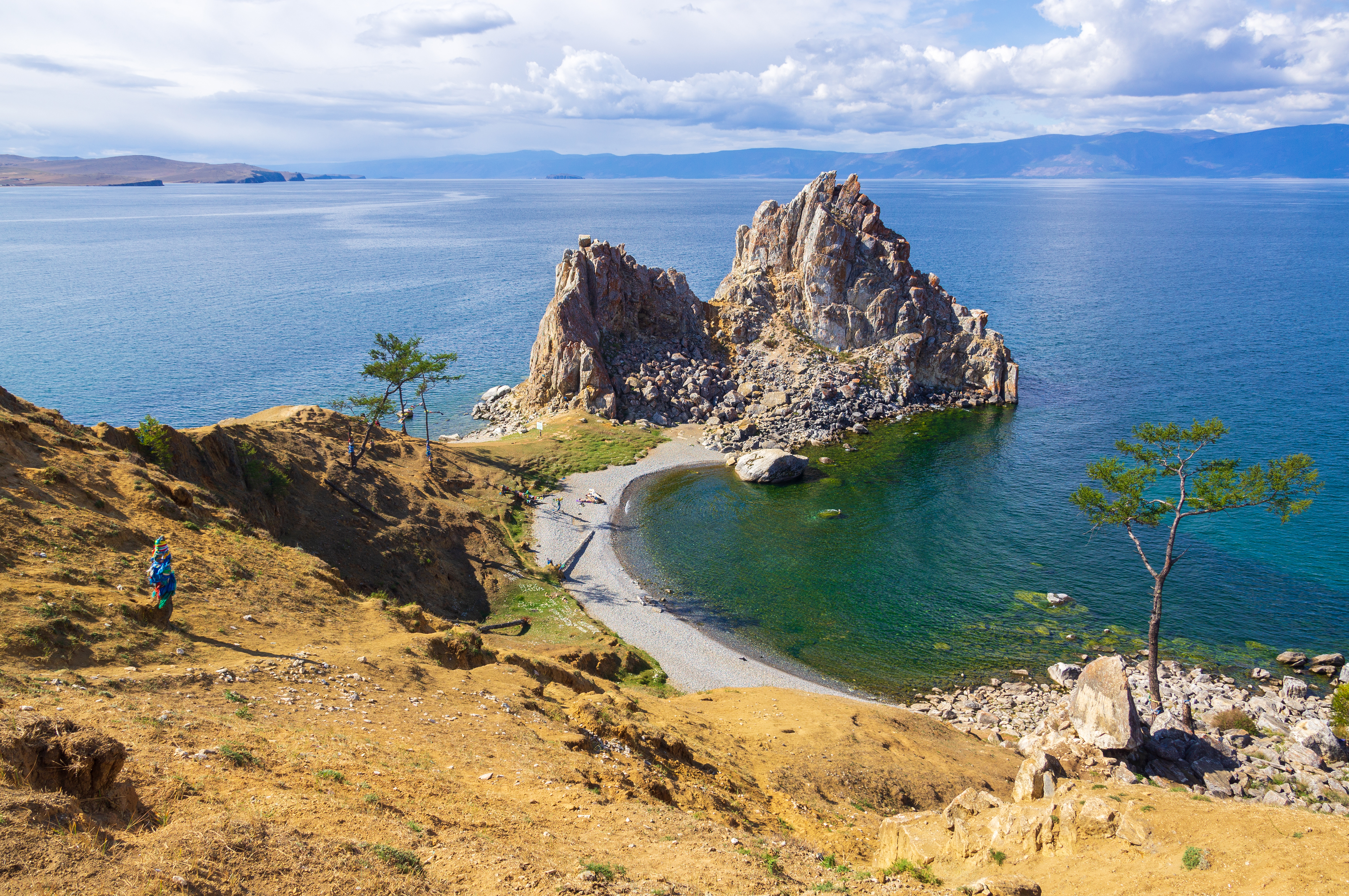
Shaman-Stone of the Olkhon Island on Baikal

Kurbat Ivanov himself safely returned to Verkholensky ostrog by the same way he had come to Baikal. He created a document called "The Chart of Baikal and into Baikal flowing rivers and lands…" ("Чертеж Байкала и в Байкал падучим рекам и землицам"). He told the stories about plenty of fish in Baikal and plenty of fur-bearing animals on its shores, and many Cossacks subsequently came to Baikal by the way he explored.

At some point of his life Ivanov also served on the lower Lena River in Zhigansk. In 1659—65 he was serving in Anadyrsky ostrog (he was the next head of Anadyrsk after Semyon Dezhnyov). In 1660 he sailed from Anadyr Bay to Cape Dezhnyov. On the basis of his own explorations, the explorations of Dezhnyov and Popov and the stories collected from the locals, Kurbat Ivanov created a map of Chukotka and Bering Strait, which was the first to show the yet undiscovered Wrangel Island, both Diomede Islands and even Alaska. However, all these lands except Chukotka coastline were shown so schematically that it is unlikely that Ivanov or other Russians had visited or saw them before. Only in 1732 Alaska was seen for the first time by the expedition of Ivan Fyodorov and Mikhail Gvozdev and it was documented. Wrangel Island was discovered much later.
