= Anadyrsk =

Coordinates: 64.72543°N 170.80886°E

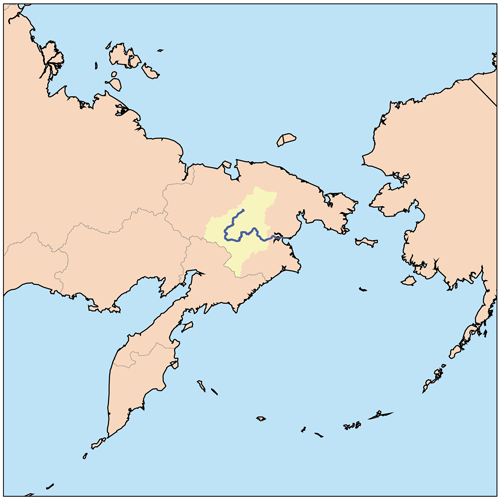
Anadyrsk was on the east–west part of the Anadyr River at the point where it swings north

Anadyrsk was an important Russian ostrog (fortified settlement) in far northeastern Siberia from 1649 to 1764. It was on the Anadyr River, near the head of small-boat navigation, about 300 miles upstream, 12 miles northeast of the present Markovo.

In 1649, Semyon Dezhnyov built a zimovye (winter quarters) here after being wrecked on the Pacific coast the previous year. In 1650, Mikhail Stadukhin and Semyon Motora arrived overland from the Kolyma River. In 1659 Kurbat Ivanov took over, built a proper stockade, and made major improvements in administration. About 1697, Anadyrsk was the launching place for Vladimir Atlasov's conquest of Kamchatka. The local Chukchi and Koryaks were warlike, and the post was attacked a number of times. George Kennan reported that its garrison through much of its service was 600 men and a battery of artillery. Its importance declined with the opening of the sea route through Okhotsk to Kamchatka in 1718. Subsequently, its importance was limited to interactions with the Chukchi. Concluding that attempts to collect tribute from the Chukchi was not a profitable proposition, the Russian government of Catherine II ordered Anadyrsk abandoned in 1764.

In 1866, when it was visited by Kennan (at that time only the second non-Russian or non-native in living memory to do so), Anadyrsk consisted of four villages: Markovo (the central one), Pokorukov, Psolkin, and Krepost. There were about 200 inhabitants and a priest. Krepost ('fort') was the site of the Anadyrsk fort, on a bank about 30 feet above the level of the river, and at that time consisted of a dozen log cabins, with no trace of the old fortifications visible. Markovo was about 15 versts (16 km) upriver, and Pokorukov a further 20 versts. Kennan described it as the Ultima Thule of Russian civilization.

== See also ==
- Chukchi
- Koryaks
