= Ivan Fyodorov (navigator) =

Russian explorer

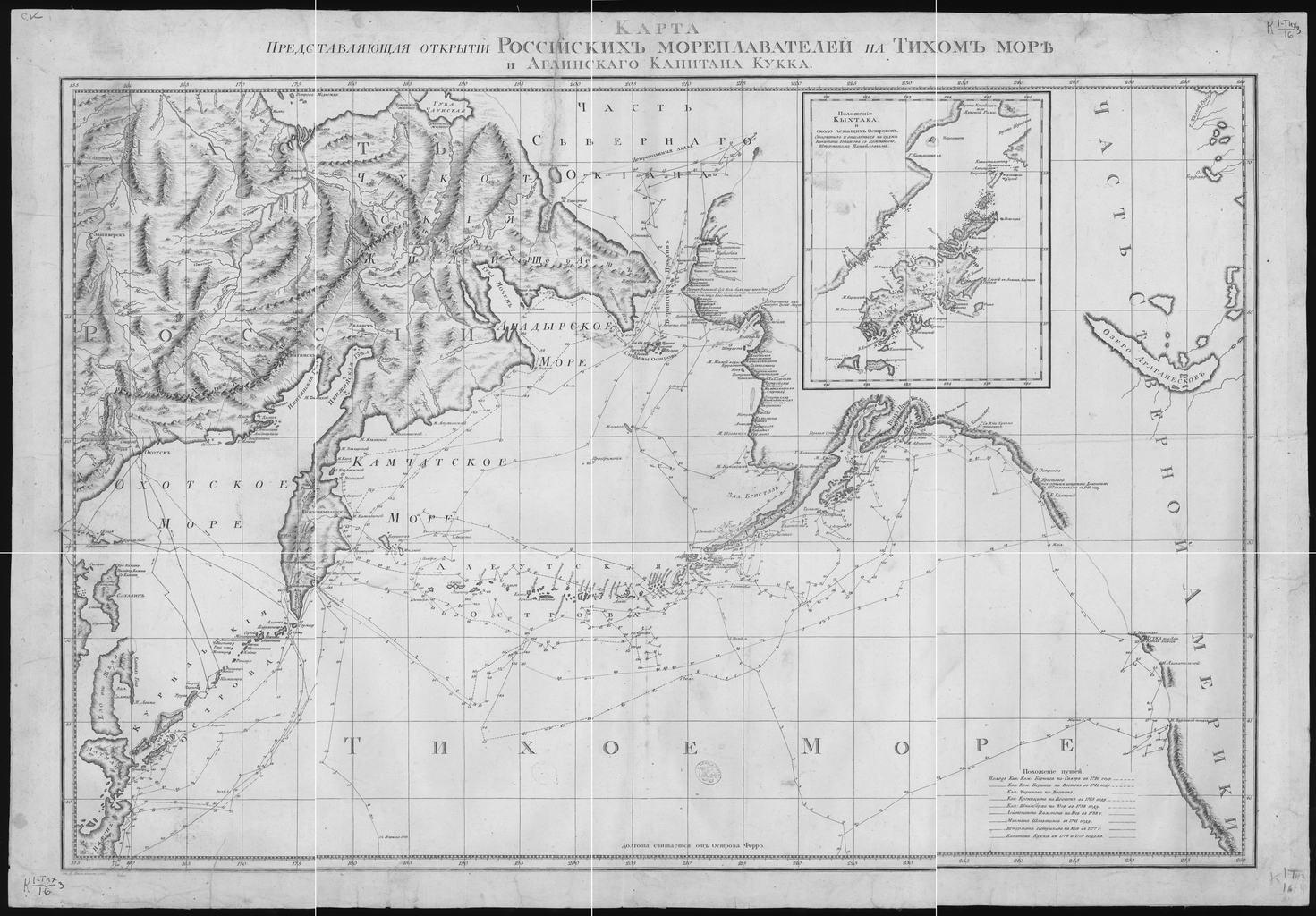
A map of the paths of James Cook and Russian explorers in the North Pacific during the 18th century, including those Fyodorov helped guide.

Ivan Fyodorov (Russian: Ива́н Фёдоров; died c. 1733) was a Russian navigator and commanding officer of the expedition to northern Alaska in 1732.

After the First Kamchatka expedition of Vitus Bering, Russian exploration efforts were continued by Bering's lieutenant Martin Spanberg and the navigator Fyodorov. In 1732, with participants of the First Kamchatka expedition, land-surveyor Mikhail Gvozdev, and the navigator K. Moshkov, Fyodorov sailed to Dezhnev Cape, the easternmost point of Asia, in the St. Gabriel (Russian: Святой Гавриил, Sviatoi Gavriil). From there, after having replenished the water supply on 5 August, they sailed east and soon came near the mainland at the Cape Prince of Wales. They charted the northwestern coast of Alaska and mapped their route. By doing this, Fyodorov and Gvozdev completed the discovery of the Bering Strait, once started by Semyon Dezhnyov and Fedot Alekseyev and continued by Bering. Their expedition also discovered three previously unknown islands.

== See also ==
- Great Northern Expedition
