= Mikhail Gvozdev =

Russian explorer and geodesist

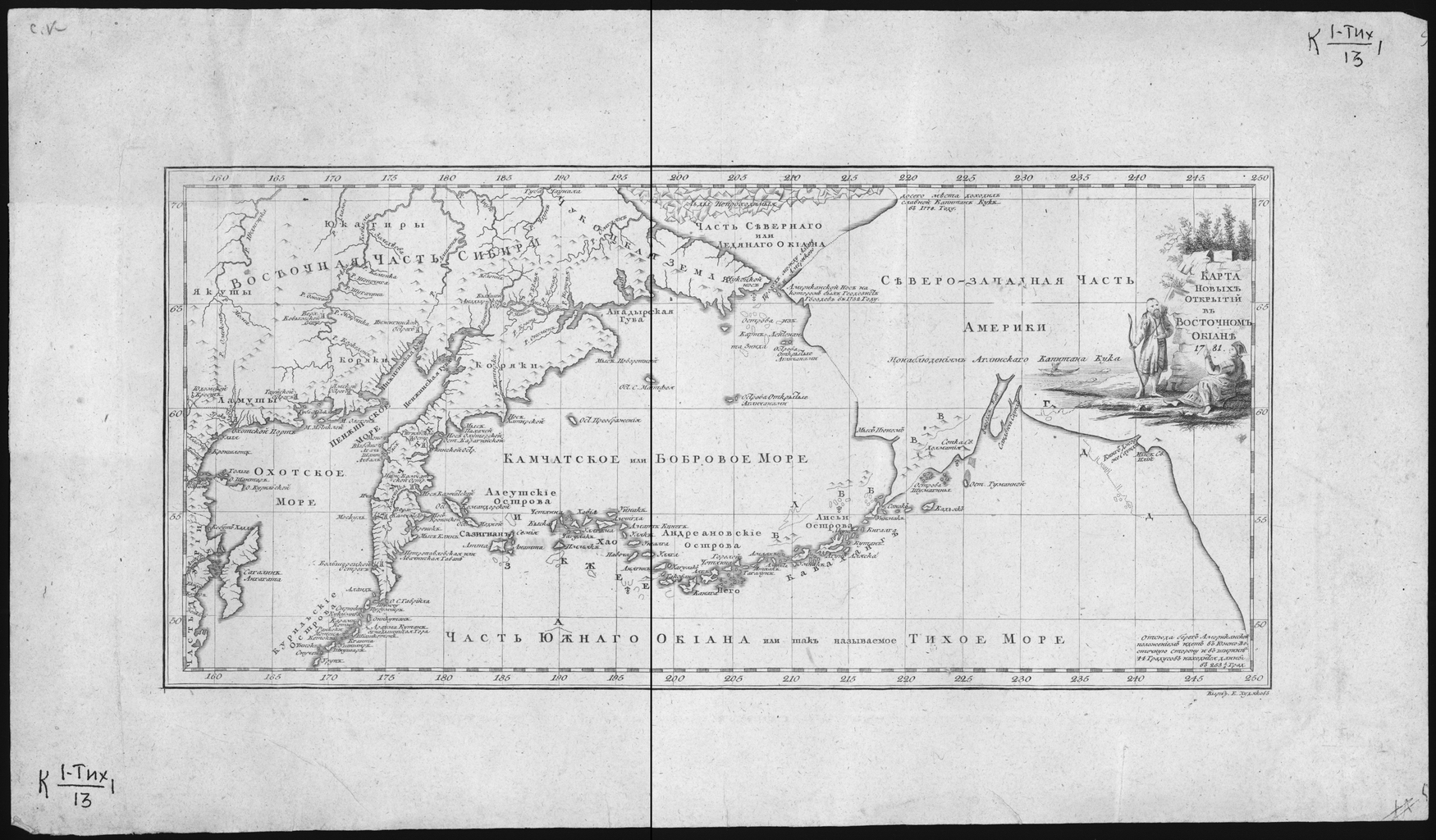
"New Discoveries in the Eastern Ocean"

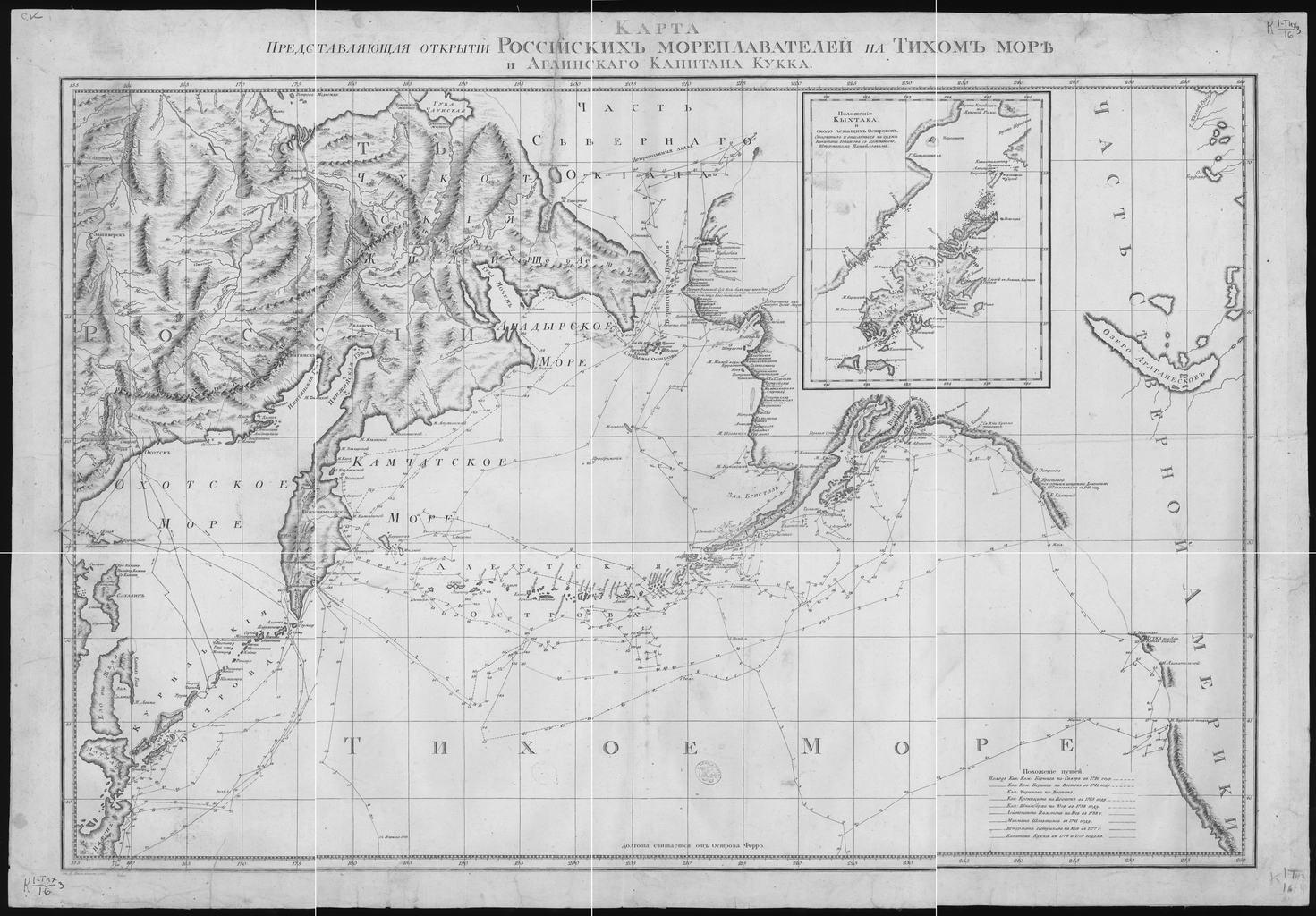
A map of the paths of James Cook and Russian explorers in the North Pacific during the 18th century, including those Gvozdev helped chart.

Mikhail Spiridonovich Gvozdev (Russian: Михаи́л Спиридо́нович Гво́здев; c. 1700 – after 1759) was a Russian military geodesist and a commander of the expedition to northern Alaska in 1732, when the Alaskan shore was sighted by Russians for the first time.

In 1732, together with the participants of the First Kamchatka expedition navigators Ivan Fyodorov and K. Moshkov, Gvozdev sailed to Dezhnev Cape, the easternmost point of Asia, in the St. Gabriel (Святой Гавриил, Sviatoi Gavriil). From there, after having replenished the water supply on 5 August, the St. Gabriel sailed east and soon came near the American mainland at Cape Prince of Wales. They charted the northwestern coast of Alaska and mapped their route. By doing this, Fyodorov and Gvozdev completed the discovery of the Bering Strait, once started by Semyon Dezhnyov and Fedot Alekseyev and continued by Bering.

Subsequently, in 1741–1742, Gvozdev participated in an expedition led by Alexey Shelting and mapped most of the western and southern shores of the Sea of Okhotsk, as well as the eastern shore of Sakhalin.

== Legacy ==
A cape on Sakhalin is named after Gvozdev.
