= Ivan Moskvitin =

Russian explorer

Ivan Yuryevich Moskvitin (Russian: Иван Юрьевич Москвитин; c. 1600 – after 1647) was a Russian zemleprokhodets who oversaw an expedition in Siberia from 1639 to 1641. He was the first recorded Russian to reach the Pacific Ocean and sighted Sakhalin. During his expedition he came into contact with the Evens and Evenki people.

== Early life ==
Ivan Yuryevich Moskvitin was a Cossack born around 1600. He is first mentioned in Tomsk in 1626. From 1635 to 1638, he was in a detachment led by Dmitry Kopylov.

== Career ==
A group of 31 men led by Moskvitin went to explore Siberia in 1639. After eleven weeks they went through the land of the Evenki people and were informed of rivers in the area. The group sailed down Aldan on a flat-bottom wooden ship. Moskvitin travelled down the Ulya river and reached the Sea of Okhotsk. They constructed two kochs for ocean travel. He was the first Russian to reach the Pacific Ocean. For the next two years his group reconnoitered the southern half of the Sea of Okhotsk. His group fought some minor skirmishes with the Evens.

While on the mainland in 1640, Moskvitin saw Sakhalin across the Strait of Tartary. He was the first Russian to make contact with the islands although the Japanese launched their first expedition to the island in 1635. Russia would not fully gain control over the islands until the Treaty of Saint Petersburg in 1875.

Moskvitin arrived in Yakutsk with 440 sable pelts and 323 fox pelts and returned to Tomsk in 1641. Moskvitin informed Prince O.I. Shcherbaty of the rivers that he surveyed. He recommended sending 1,000 men and ten cannons to the area and later sent a report to Moscow in 1645. The last mention of Moskvitin is in 1647. The northern portion of the Sea of Okhotsk would not be explored until Mikhail Stadukhin did so from 1650 to 1657.

== Works cited ==
=== Books ===
- Postnikov, Alexey; Falk, Marvin (2015). Exploring and Mapping Alaska: The Russian America Era, 1741-1867. University Press of Colorado. ISBN 9781602232525.
- Shaw, Denis (2024). Reconnoitring Russia: Mapping, exploring and describing early modern Russia, 1613-1825. University College London. ISBN 9781800085916.

=== Journals ===
- Gibson, James (1970). "Russian Occupance of the Far East, 1639-1750". Canadian Slavonic Papers. 12 (1). Taylor & Francis: 60–77. doi:10.2307/40866274. JSTOR 40866274.
- Stephan, John (1970). "Sakhalin Island: Soviet Outpost in Northeast Asia". Asian Survey. 10 (12). University of California Press: 1090–1100. doi:10.2307/2643058. JSTOR 2643058.

=== Web ===
- "385 ЛЕТ СО ВРЕМЕНИ НАЧАЛА ЭКСПЕДИЦИИ ИВАНА ЮРЬЕВИЧА МОСКВИТИНА К БЕРЕГАМ ТИХОГО ОКЕАНА". Bikin Public Museum. 2 September 2024. Archived from the original on 15 May 2025.
- "Иван Юрьевич Москвитин". Russian Geographical Society. Archived from the original on 12 July 2025.
