= Grey Zone Agreement =

Agreement about the disputed sea area between Norway and Russia

The Grey Zone Agreement (Norwegian: Gråsoneavtalen) was a provisional agreement between Norway and the Soviet Union to serve as a base to handle unresolved issues of jurisdiction and resource access in the disputed areas of the Barents Sea. The negotiations about it were concluded in 1977 and it was ratified in 1978.

The Russian point of view on the history of these negotiations was published in a 2013 book Россия теряет Арктику? by Vyacheslav Zilanov translated into Norwegian as Mister Russland Arktis? in 2018.

Initially concluded for one year, in was successfully renewed each year. The issue was resolved in 2010 by an agreement between Norway ad Russia.
