= Cape Prince of Wales =

Westernmost mainland point of the Americas

Coordinates: 65°38′24″N 168°7′12″W

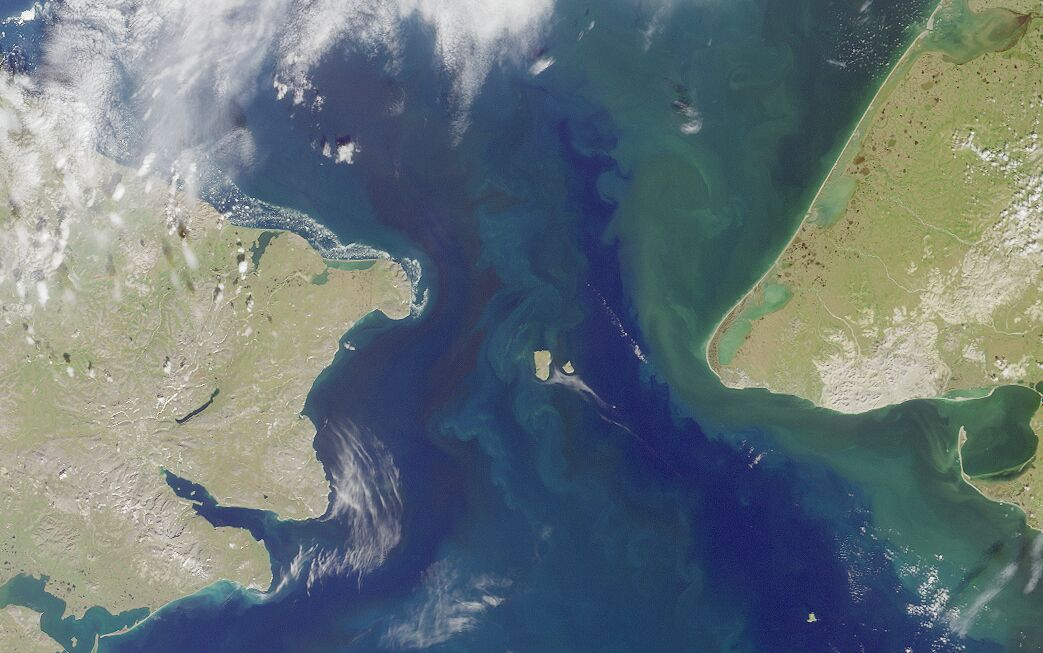
Satellite image of the Bering Strait. Russia is on the left while the USA is on the right. Between them are the Diomede Islands.

Cape Prince of Wales (Russian: Мыс Принца Уэльского; Inupiaq: Siuġaq, Sivuġaq) is the westernmost mainland point of the Americas. It was named in 1778 by Captain James Cook of the British Royal Navy, presumably for the Prince of Wales at the time, George Augustus Frederick. Discovered (for Europeans) in 1732, by an expedition led by a Russian military geodesist Mikhail Gvozdev in Sviatoi Gavriil (St. Gabriel); later, the cape was named by Vitus Bering for Gvozdev as Mys Gvozdeva (Cape Gvozdev). The Yupik name of the cape, published by Gavril Sarychev in 1826, was Nykhta. The current name was approved by a decision of the U.S. Board on Geographic Names in 1944.

Located on the Seward Peninsula of the U.S. state of Alaska near the settlement of Wales, Cape Prince of Wales is the terminus of the Continental Divide, marking the division between the Pacific and Arctic coasts, as well as marking the limit between the Bering Sea and the Chukchi Sea. It is the eastern boundary of the Bering Strait, 51 miles (82 km) opposite Cape Dezhnev, and adjacent to the Diomede Islands and Fairway Rock.
