= Fyodor Minin =

Russian Arctic explorer

Fyodor Alekseyevich Minin (Russian: Федор Алексеевич Минин) (ca. 1709 - after 1742) was a Russian Arctic explorer.

In 1730s, Minin participated in the Second Kamchatka expedition. On January 7, 1736, he joined the unit led by Dmitry Ovtsyn. In 1738, he was in charge of a group of explorers, that would chart the Arctic Ocean coastline east of the Yenisei river. In 1738–1740, Minin made an attempt to go around the Taimyr Peninsula from the north and reached 75°15'N. Together with Dmitry Sterlegov, he mapped this part of the Arctic Ocean coastline.

A cape at the Mammoth Peninsula, a peninsula, the Minina Skerries in the Kara Sea, a gulf, and a mountain on the shores of the Taimyr Peninsula bear Minin's name.
