= Cape Dezhnyov =

Easternmost point of the Asian continent

Cape Dezhnev Russian: мыс Дежнёва Eskimo–Aleut: Tugnehalha
- Cape
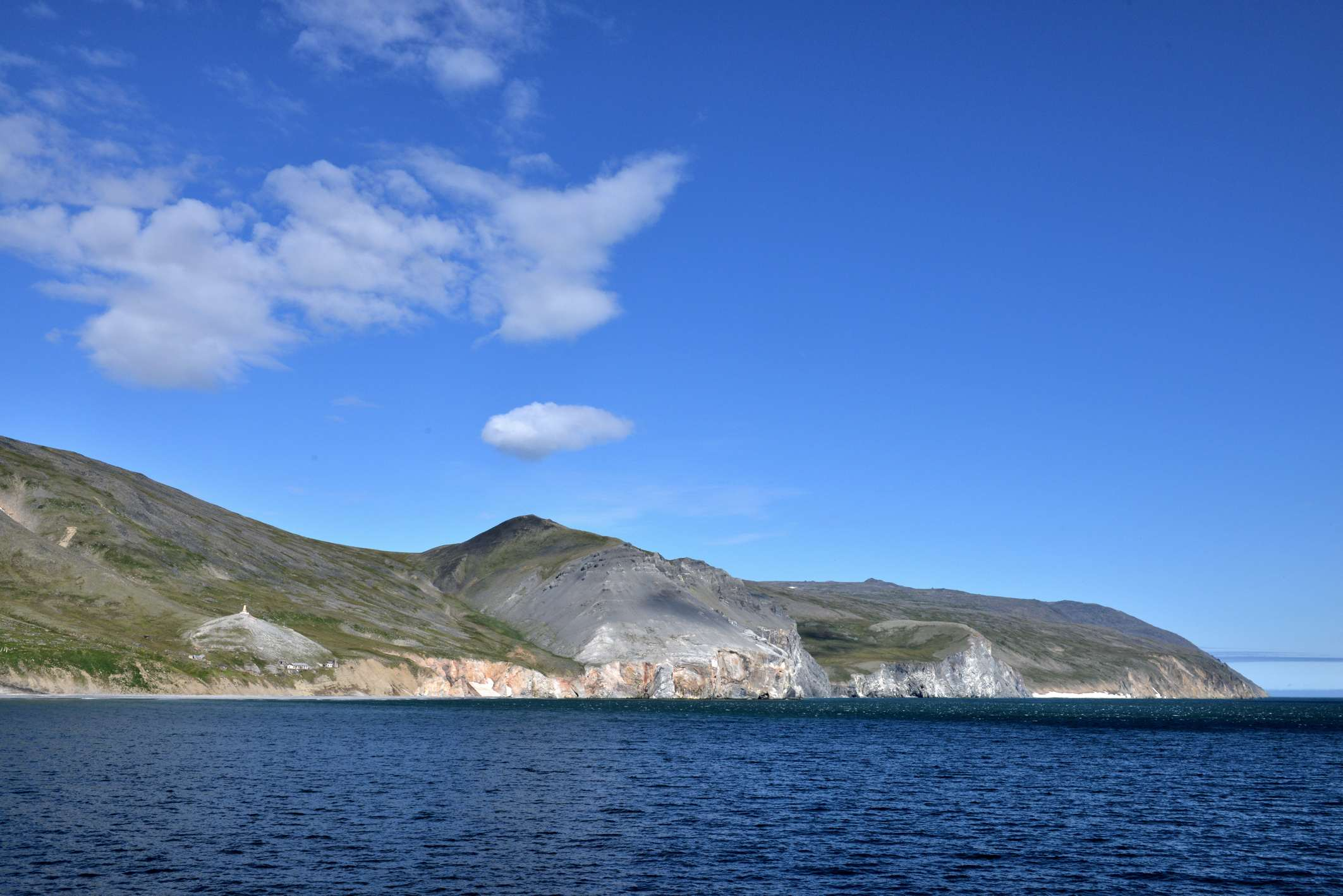

- Location within Chukotka Autonomous Okrug
- Coordinates: 66°4′45″N 169°39′7″W
- Location: Chukotka, Russia
- Water bodies: Chukchi Sea

Area
  - Total: Russian Far East
- Elevation: 741 m (2,431 ft)

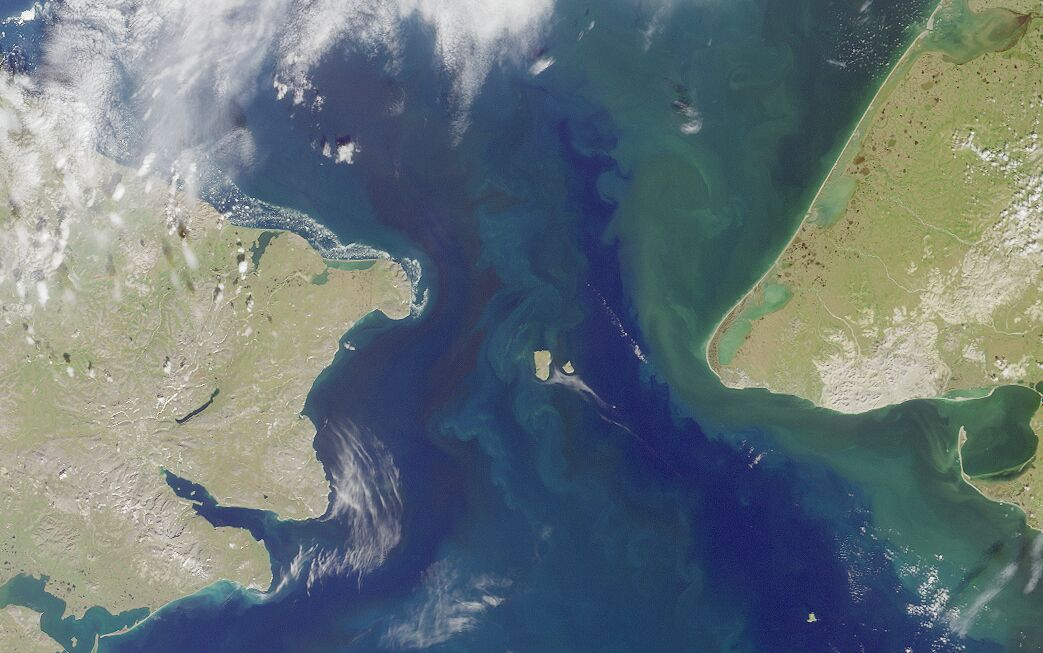
Satellite image of Bering Strait. Cape Dezhnev, Russia is on the left while Cape Prince of Wales, USA, is on the right.

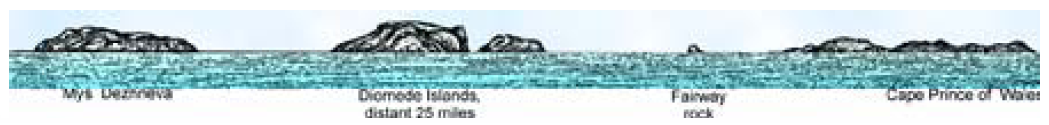
Headlands and islands of the Bering Strait as seen from a point 25 miles (40 km) south of the Diomede Islands. Cape Dezhnev on the far left.

Cape Dezhnyov or Cape Dezhnev (Russian: мыс Дежнёва; Eskimo–Aleut: Tugnehalha; Inupiaq: Nuuġaq), formerly known as East Cape or Cape Vostochny, is a cape that forms the easternmost mainland point of Asia. It is located on the Chukchi Peninsula in the very sparsely populated Chukotka Autonomous Okrug of Russia. This cape is located between the Chukchi Sea and the Bering Strait, 82 kilometres (51 mi) across from Cape Prince of Wales in Alaska; the Bering Strait is delimited by the two capes. The Diomede Islands and Fairway Rock are located in the midst of the strait.

== Geography ==
In 1898, the cape was officially renamed as Cape Dezhnev, replacing Captain James Cook's name, the "East Cape". It was named in honor of Semyon Dezhnev, the first recorded European to round its tip (in 1648). There is a large monument to Dezhnev on the seacoast.

The cape is the eastern tip of a high, rocky headland, about 20 kilometres (12 mi) from Uelen in the north to Cape Pe'ek in the south, connected to the mainland by a neck of lower-lying land peppered with swamps and shallow lakes. That low-lying land is so low in elevation that the cape appears as an island from a distance far to the south of it. The US Hydrographic Office publication Asiatic Pilot from 1909 gives the height of the headland as 2,521 feet (768 m), and the US Office of Coast Survey chart of 2000 shows the highest peak at 2,638 feet (804 m). The headland and the neck of low-lying land together form a peninsula. A well-established trail crossed the neck of land behind the headland in pre-historic and historic times, traversed by sleds in the winter and used as a portage in the summer to avoid traversing the strait. This route was important enough that, according to an analysis by linguist Michael Krauss, the Central Siberian Yupik language continued up the coast, un-interrupted by the Naukansky dialect spoken in the village of Naukan on the headland.

The Great Circle distance from Cape Dezhnev to the shore of the Bab-el-Mandeb strait in Yemen is about 10,855 kilometres (6,745 mi), which is the longest land distance of Asia.

== History ==
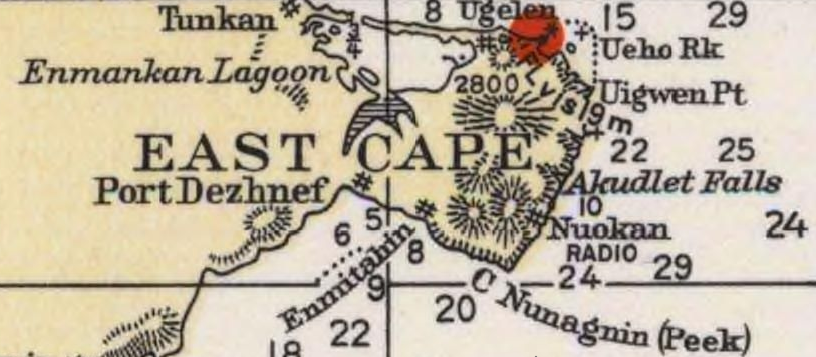
Detail of a USCGS chart from 1937 showing Cape Dezhnev (East Cape) with the historical villages Tunkan, Uelen (Ugelen), Naukan (Nuokan), Enmitahin, and Dezhnevo (Port Dezhnev) marked. The shape of the cape is somewhat distorted in this map.

The Cape Dezhnev (or East Cape, as it was then generally called) peninsula was a center for trade between American (and other) whalers and the fur traders and the native Yupik and Chukchi people of the coast in the late 19th and early 20th centuries. In the early years, ships would call at Uelen to trade for furs produced along the Arctic coast. Subsequently, trading stations were established at Uelen and Deshnevo (Keniskun in Chukchi, Kaniskak in Yupik). When a source of that period speaks of stopping or trading at East Cape, it can refer to either of these locations or to the Yupik village of Naukan on the southeast shore of the cape, which had less trade because it lacked a good anchorage. Sources from that period sometimes speak of a village called Emma-Town. Although this name may be derived from the nearby Yupik village of Enmitahin (Chukchi for "end of the cliff"), the name appears to refer to Keniskun (where the traders were) or perhaps to both villages together. Of the four historical villages on the cape itself, only Uelen is still inhabited. Naukan was evacuated in 1958 with most of the occupants relocated to Nunyamo near Saint Lawrence Bay, Chukotka, and Keniskun was merged with Uelen a little earlier.

In Josef Bauer's As Far as My Feet Will Carry Me (1955), Cape Deshnev is given as the site of a Gulag lead-mine camp from which German POW Clemens Forell (actual name: Cornelius Rost) escaped in 1949. Later research cast serious doubt on the book's accuracy; at the time of the supposed escape, no Cape Dezhnev Gulag camp lead mine existed.

== Gallery ==
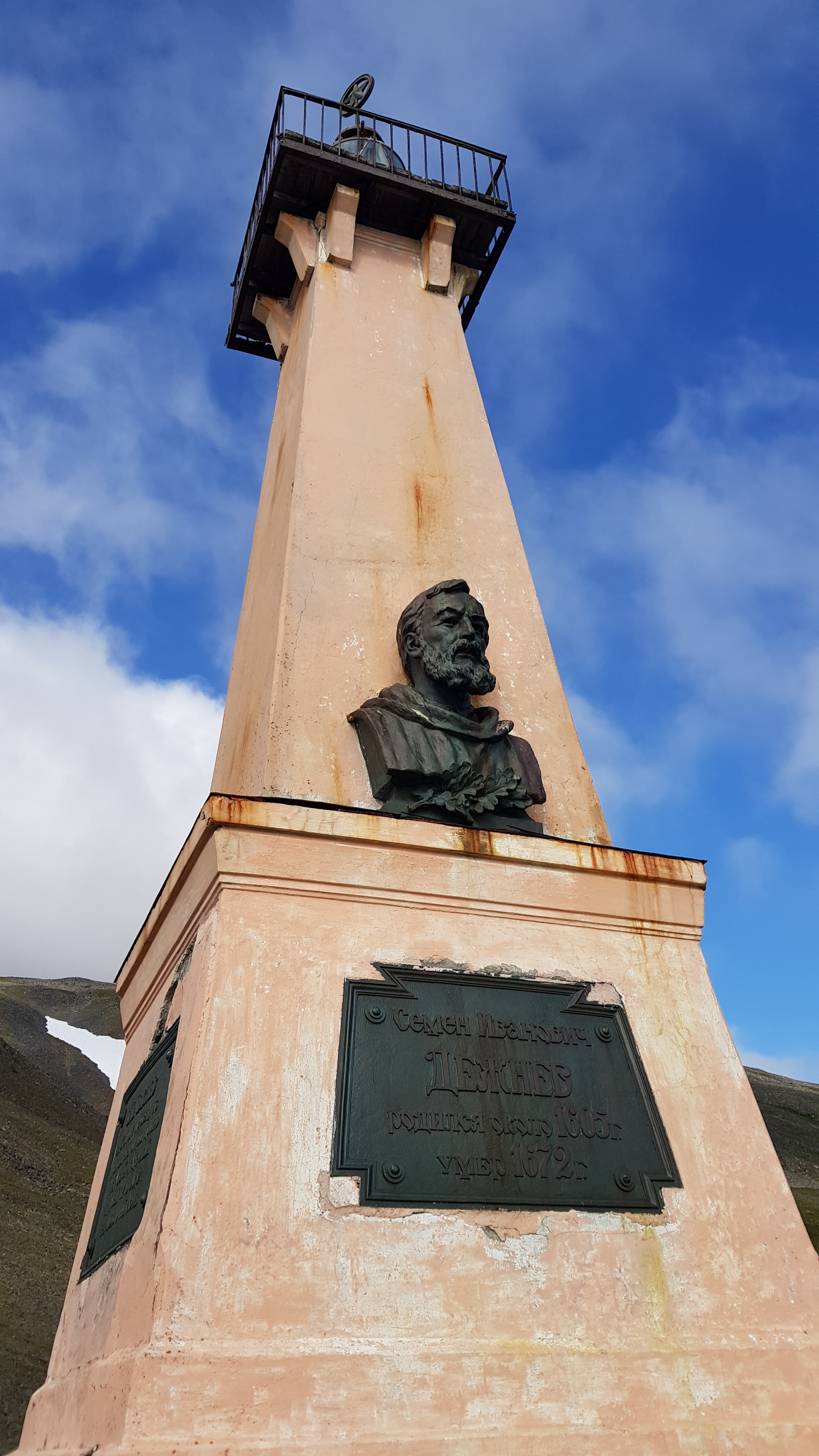
Cape Dezhnev lighthouse, August 2018

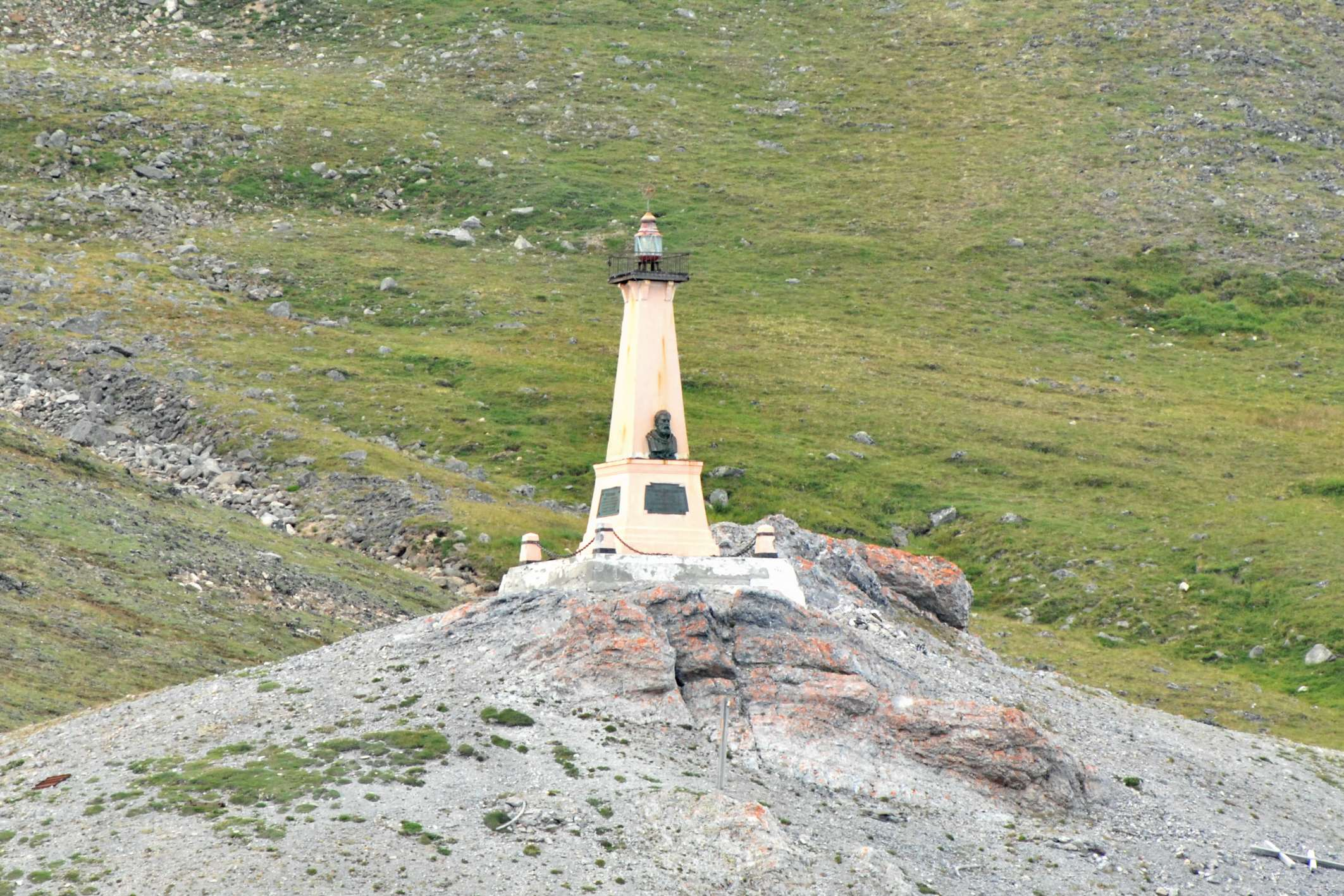
Cape Dezhnev Lighthouse with Dezhnev Monument

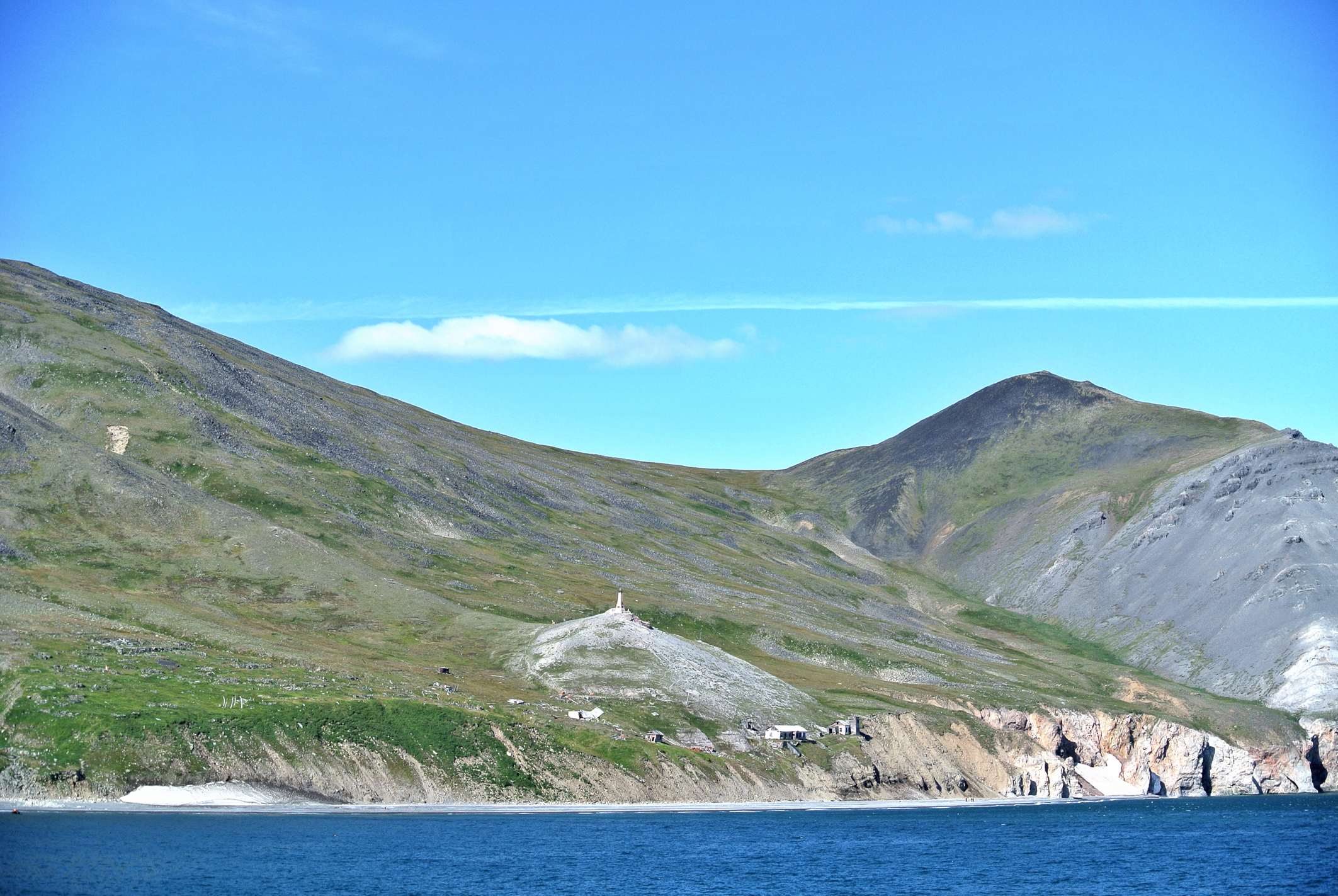
Cape Dezhnev (Chukotka, Russia) with lighthouse (Dezhnew Monument) and abandoned village Naukan

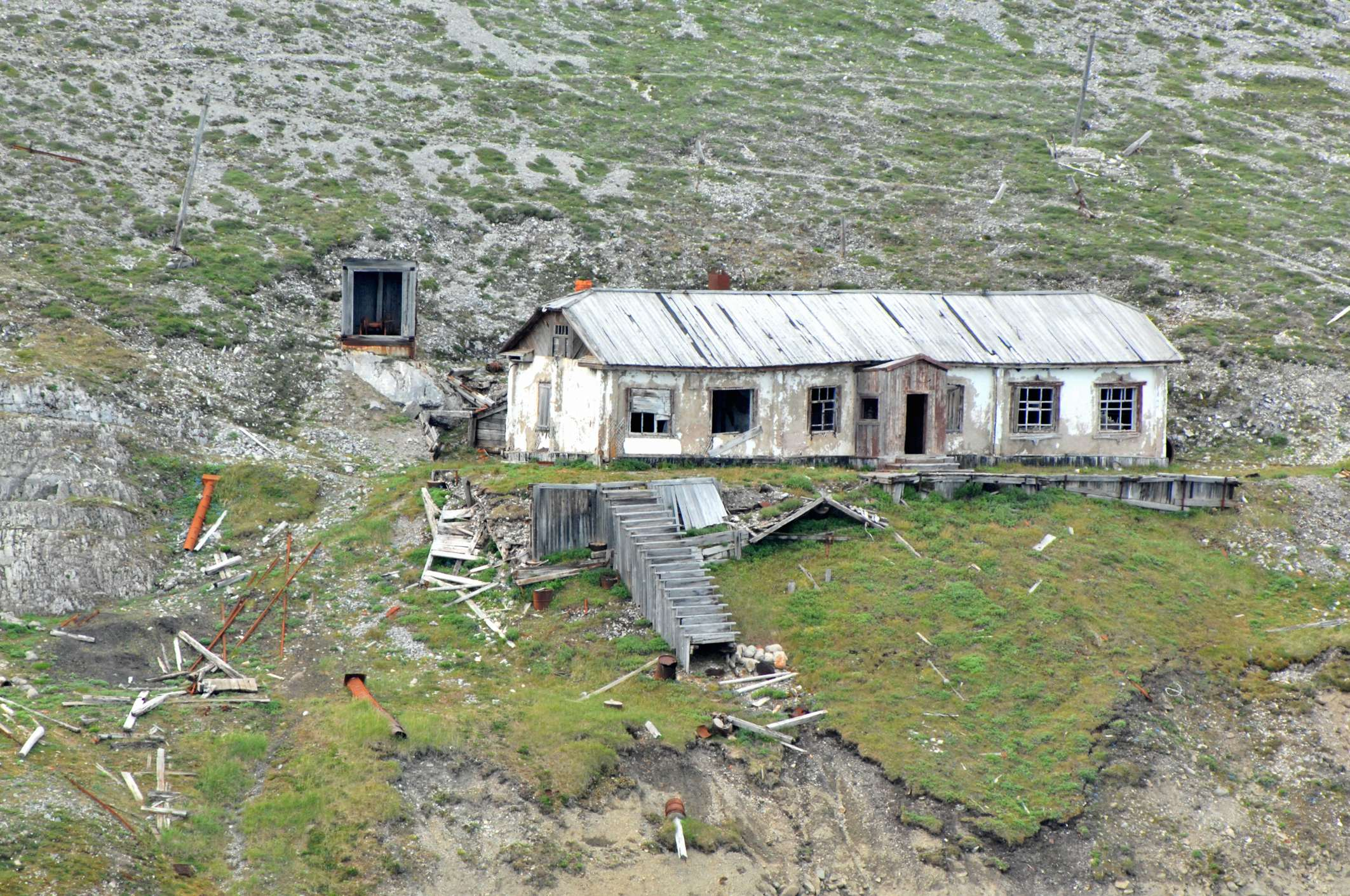
Kap Dezhnev, remains of abandoned Naukan village

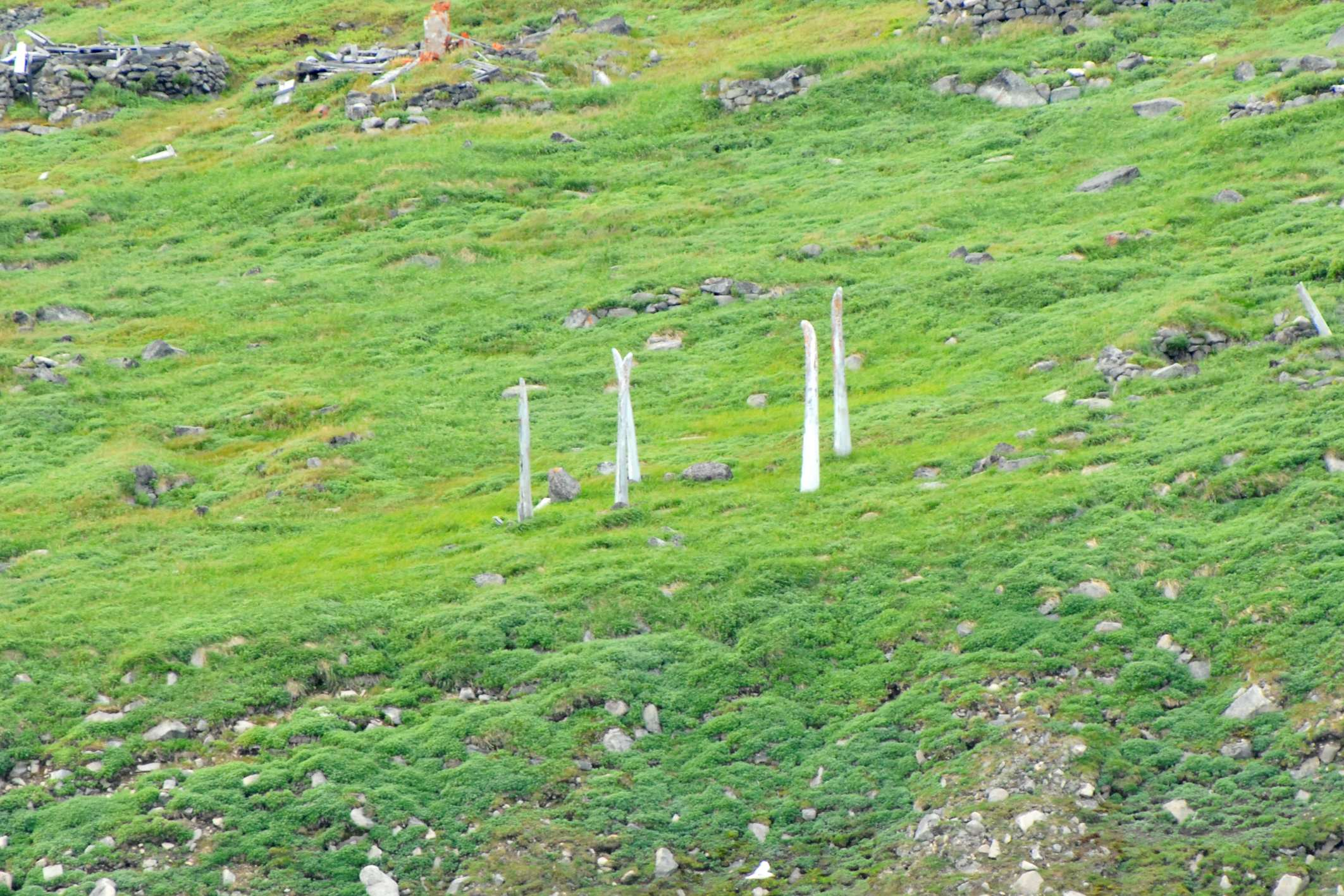
Erected whalebones near Naukan

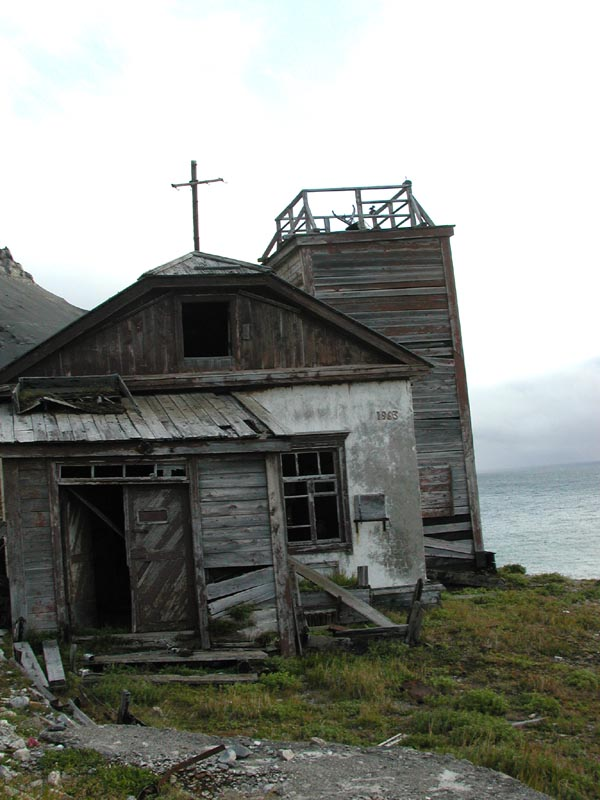
Old Outpost

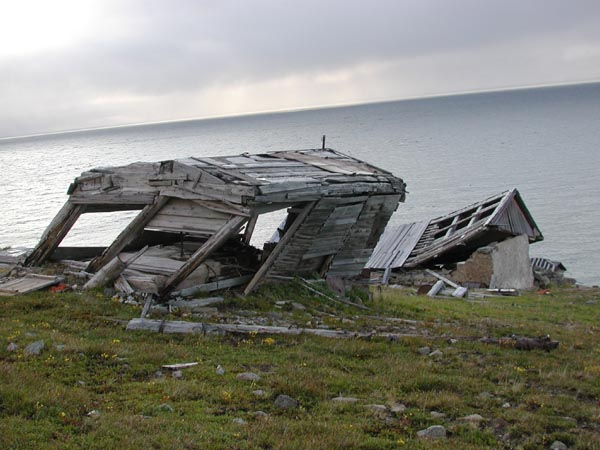
Soviet Ruins

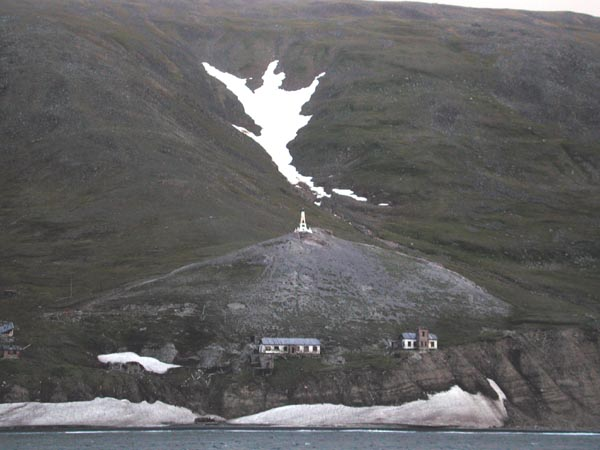
Abandoned village of Naukan near Cape Dezhnev

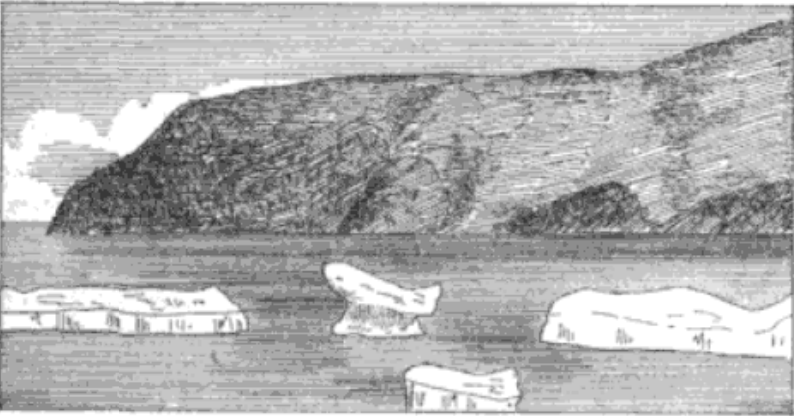
Sketch of Cape Dezhnev from the northeast.

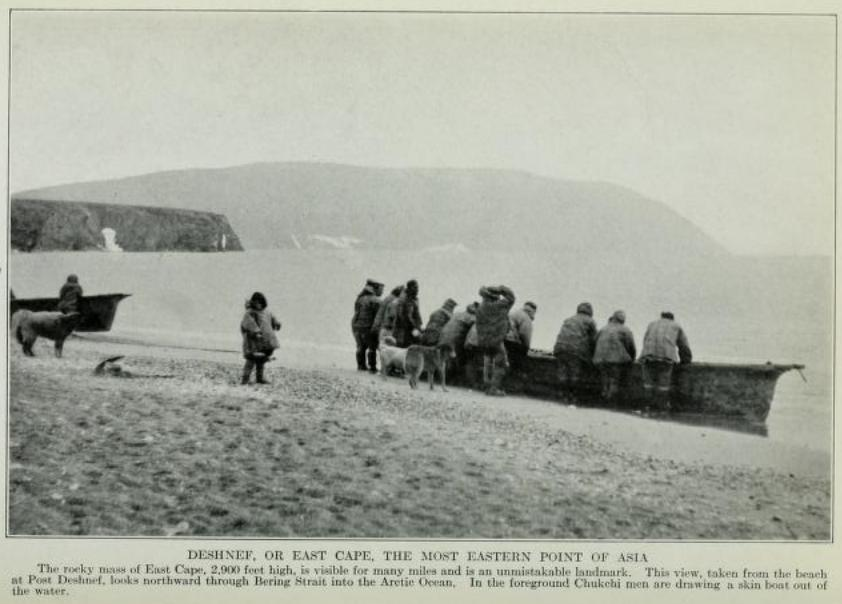
Chukchi men at Dezhnevo pulling an umiak onto the beach, Cape Dezhnev headland in background, 1913

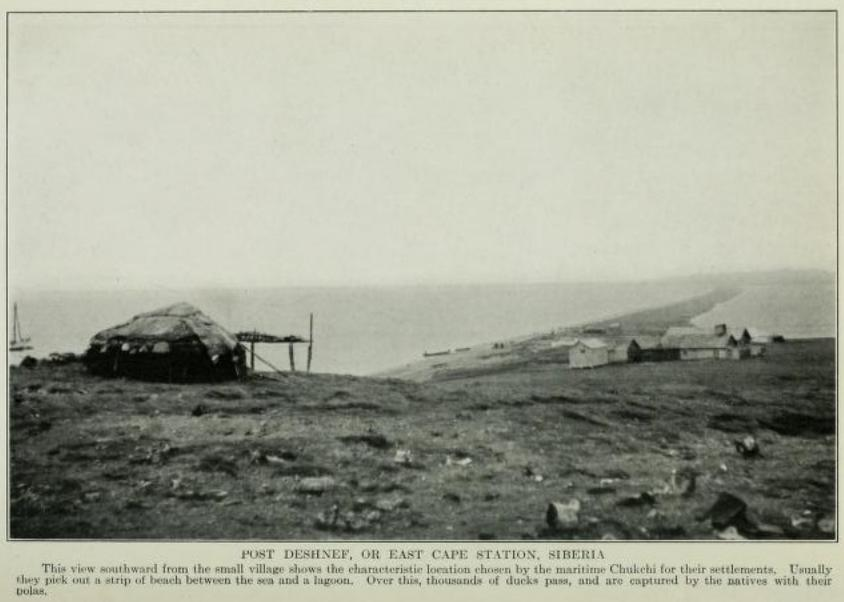
View of part of Port Dezhnev, 1913. The American-style cabins near the lagoon are probably a trading station.

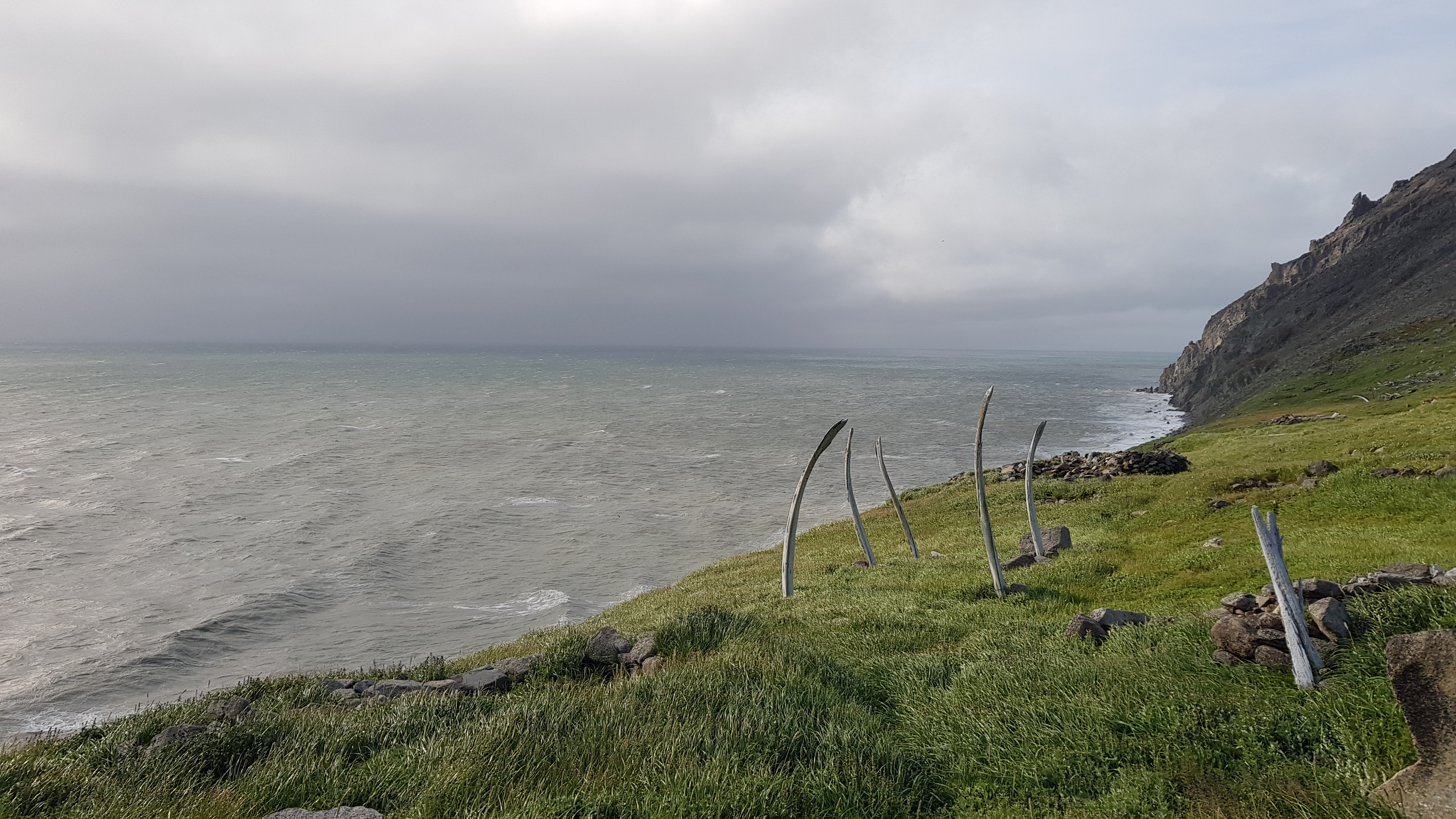
Dezhnev cape erected whalebones

== See also ==
- Extreme points of Russia
- East Siberian Mountains
