= Dmitry Ovtsyn =

Russian hydrographer and Arctic explorer

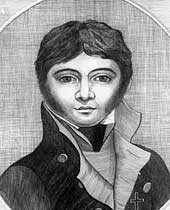
A portrait of Dmitry Ovtsyn by N. V. Pinegin

Dmitry Leontiyevich Ovtsyn (Russian: Дмитрий Леонтьевич Овцын) (unknown - after 1757) was a Russian hydrographer and Arctic explorer. The Ovtsyn family is one of the oldest Russian noble families, originating from the descendants of Rurik, the Murom princes.

== Ovtsyn's biography ==
Ovtsyn's childhood coincided with the time of Peter the Great's transformations in Russia. When Ovtsyn graduated from the Academy, he became a Navigator. While still a student at the Academy in 1725, he took part in the first long-distance foreign voyage of the young Russian fleet. In 1726 Ovtsyn graduated from the Academy and from 1726 to 1729 sailed on the same frigate "Amsterdam-Galey" as a Navigator student, then a Navigator. The young sailor soon attracted the attention of his superiors and was appointed to the post of adjutant to the chief commander of the Kronstadt port, which at that time was Admiral Thomas Gordon. In 1732, Ovtsyn was promoted to the rank of "non-Lieutenant from the soldiers". Two years later, due to his having experience and excellent knowledge in navigational and hydrographic matters, Ovtsyn was appointed to the great Northern expedition, led by Vitus Bering. In 1734–1738, Ovtsyn led one of the units of the Second Kamchatka expedition that charted the coastline of the Kara Sea east of the river Ob. In summer of 1737, his unit made its way from Ob to Yenisei and made the first hydrographic description of this part of the Siberian coastline. In 1741, Ovtsyn took part in Vitus Bering's voyage to the shores of America.

== Honours ==
A cape on the Taimyr Peninsula and a strait between the islands Oleniy and Sibiryakov bear his name.

== See also ==
- Russian Hydrographic Service
