= Semyon Dezhnev =

Russian explorer (1605–1673)

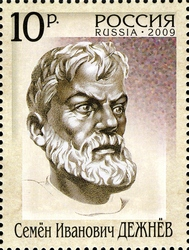
- Born: March 7, 1605; Pinega or Veliky Ustyug, Russia
- Died: 1673; Moscow, Russia
- Occupation: Explorer
- Known for: Exploring the Russian Far East and the Pacific coast of North-Western America
- Spouse(s): Abakajada Sjuchu; Kanteminka Arhipova

Semyon Ivanovich Dezhnev (Russian: Семён Ива́нович Дежнёв, IPA: [sʲɪˈmʲɵn ɨˈvanəvʲɪdʑ dʲɪʐˈnʲɵf]; sometimes spelled Dezhnyov; c. March 7, 1605 – 1673) was a Russian zemleprokhodets, an explorer of Siberia and the first European to sail through the Bering Strait, 80 years before Vitus Bering did. In 1648 he sailed from the Kolyma River on the Arctic Ocean to the Anadyr River on the Pacific. His exploit was forgotten for almost a hundred years and Bering is usually given credit for discovering the strait that bears his name.

== Biography ==
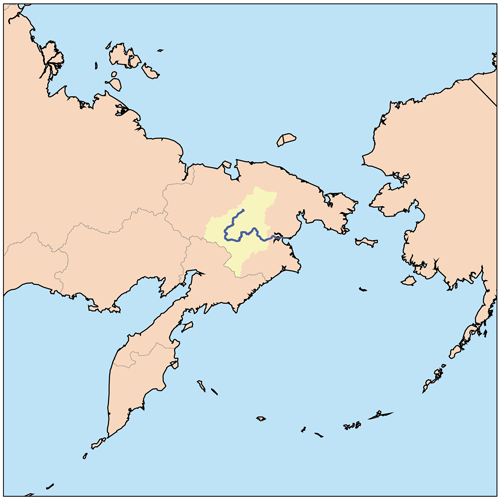
Bering Strait and the Anadyr River. The mouth of the Kolyma is very close to the vertical line on the Arctic coast which marks today's administrative borders.

Dezhnyov was a Pomor Russian, born in 1605, possibly in the town of Veliky Ustyug or the village of Pinega. According to the anthropologist Lydia T. Black, Dezhnyov was recruited for Siberian service in 1630, possibly as a service man or government agent. He served for eight years in Tobolsk and Yeniseisk, and then went to Yakutia in 1639, or possibly earlier. He is said to have been a member of the Cossack detachment under Beketov, who is credited with founding Yakutsk (on the Lena River) in 1632. In any case, no later than 1639 he was sent to Yakutia, where he married a Yakut captive and spent the next three years collecting yasak (otherwise known as fur tribute) from the natives.

In 1641, Dezhnyov moved northeast to a newly discovered tributary of the Indigirka River where he served under Mikhail Stadukhin. Finding few furs and hostile natives and hearing of a rich river to the east, he, Stadukhin and Yarilo Zyrian sailed down the Indigirka, then east along the coast to the Kolyma River, where they built an ostrog (or fort) (1643). This was at the time the easternmost Russian frontier. The Kolyma soon proved to be one of the richest areas in eastern Siberia. In 1647, 396 men paid head-tax there and 404 men received passports to travel from Yakutsk to the Kolyma.

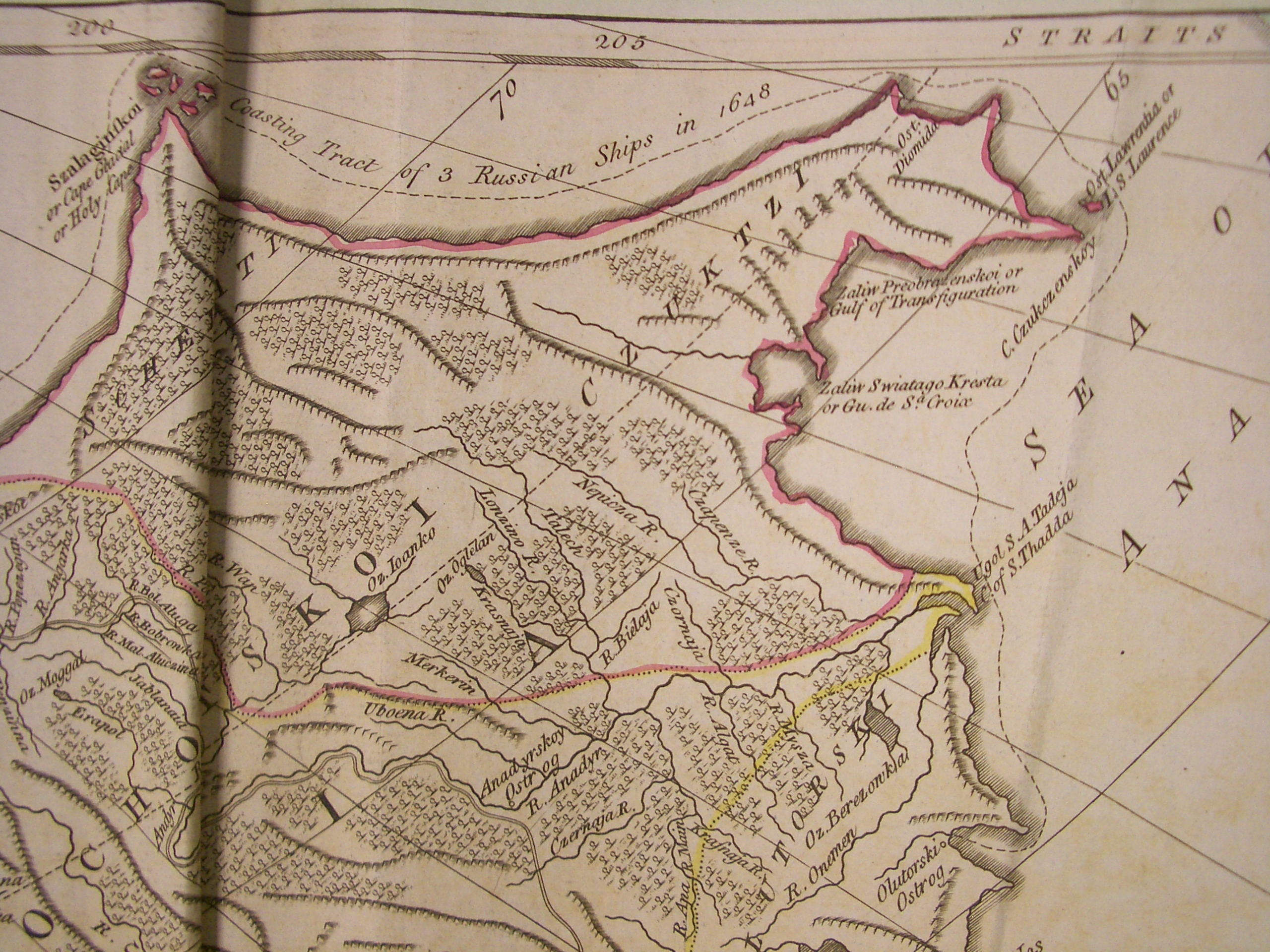
Early map of Chukotka, showing the route of the Dezhnyov expedition of 1648

From about 1642, Russians began hearing of a 'Pogycha River' to the east which flowed into the Arctic and that the nearby area was rich in sable fur, walrus ivory and silver ore. An attempt to reach it in 1646 failed. In 1647, Fedot Alekseyev, an agent of a Moscow merchant, organized an expedition and brought in Dezhnyov because he was a government official. The expedition reached the sea but was unable to round the Chukchi Peninsula because it had to turn back due to thick drift ice.

They tried again the following year (1648). Fedot Alekseyev was joined by two others, Andreev and Afstaf'iev, representing the Guselnikov merchant house, with their own vessels and men, while Alekseyev provided five vessels and the majority of the men. Gerasim Ankudinov, with his own vessel and 30 men, also joined the expedition. Dezhnyov recruited his own men, 18 or 19, for fur gathering for private profit, as was the custom at the time. The whole group numbered between 89 and 121 people, travelling in traditional koch vessels. At least one woman, Alekseyev's Yakut wife, was with this group.

On 20 June 1648 (old style, 30 June new style), they departed from (most likely) Srednekolymsk and sailed down the river to the Arctic. During the next year it was learned from captives that two koches had been wrecked and their survivors killed by the natives. Two other koches were lost in a way that is not recorded. Some time before 20 September (o.s) they rounded a 'great rocky projection'. Here Ankudinov's koch was wrecked and the survivors were transferred to the remaining two vessels. At the beginning of October a storm blew up and Fedot's koch disappeared. In 1653/4, Dezhnyov rescued from the indigenous Koryaks Fedot's Yakut woman, who had accompanied him from the Kolyma. She said that Fedot died of scurvy, that several of his companions were killed by the Koryaks, and that the rest had fled in small boats to an unknown fate.

Dezhnyov's koch was driven by the storm and was eventually wrecked somewhere south of the Anadyr. The remaining 25 men wandered in unknown country for 10 weeks until they came to the mouth of the Anadyr. Twelve men went up the Anadyr, walked for 20 days, found nothing and turned back. Three of the stronger men got back to Dezhnyov and the rest were never heard of again. In the spring or early summer of 1649 the 12 remaining men built boats from driftwood and went up the Anadyr. They were probably trying to get out of the tundra into forested country to obtain sables and firewood. About 320 miles upriver they built a zimovye (winter quarters) somewhere near Anadyrsk and subjected the local Yukaghirs to tribute.

In 1649, Russians on the Kolyma ascended the Anyuy River branch of the Kolyma and learned that one could travel from its headwaters to the headwaters of the Pogycha-Anadyr. In 1650 Stadukhin and Semyon Motora followed this route and stumbled onto Dezhnyov's camp. The land route was clearly superior and Dezhnyov's sea route was never used again. Dezhnyov spent the next several years exploring and collecting tribute from the natives. More cossacks arrived from the Kolyma; Motora was killed and Stadukhin went south to find the Penzhina River. Dezhnyov found a walrus rookery at the mouth of the Anadyr and ultimately accumulated over 2 tons of walrus ivory, far more valuable than the few furs found at Anadyrsk.

In 1659, Dezhnyov transferred his authority to Kurbat Ivanov, the discoverer of Lake Baikal. In 1662 he was at Yakutsk. In 1664 he reached Moscow and after selling 4.6 tons of walrus tusks from the North, he became a wealthy man. Also, for his merits as a researcher, he was awarded the title of chieftain. He later served on the Olenyok River and the Vilyuy River. In 1670 he escorted 47,164 rubles (a soldier was paid about 5 rubles a year) of tribute to Moscow and died there in late 1672.

=== Dezhnyov's 1648 expedition results ===
As stated above, Dezhnyov traveled with Fedot Alekseyev and two others, Andreev and Afstaf'iev. Except for Dezhnyov, none of the other leaders of this expedition survived to tell their tale. Dezhnyov rounded the eastern extremity of Asia, East Cape, now known to Russians as Cape Dezhnyov, possibly made landfall on the Diomede Islands, sailed through the Bering Strait, reached the Anadyr River, ascended it and founded the Anadyr ostrog.

Four of the seven vessels were lost before reaching Bering Strait, and Ankudinov's koch was wrecked in or near Bering Strait. This meant that only two vessels went beyond the strait. Alekseyev's boat is believed by some to have made landfall in the vicinity of the Kamchatka River, further down the coast of Kamchatka. It appears that scholars agree only on the fate of Dezhnyov's vessel, which was not lost.

It was widely believed at the time that these vessels had reached the American shore and that their men had founded a Russian settlement there. Such a colony was searched for by many Russian expeditions launched by the Russian-American Company from 1818 on and during the early 1820s.

== A discovery and its re-discovery ==
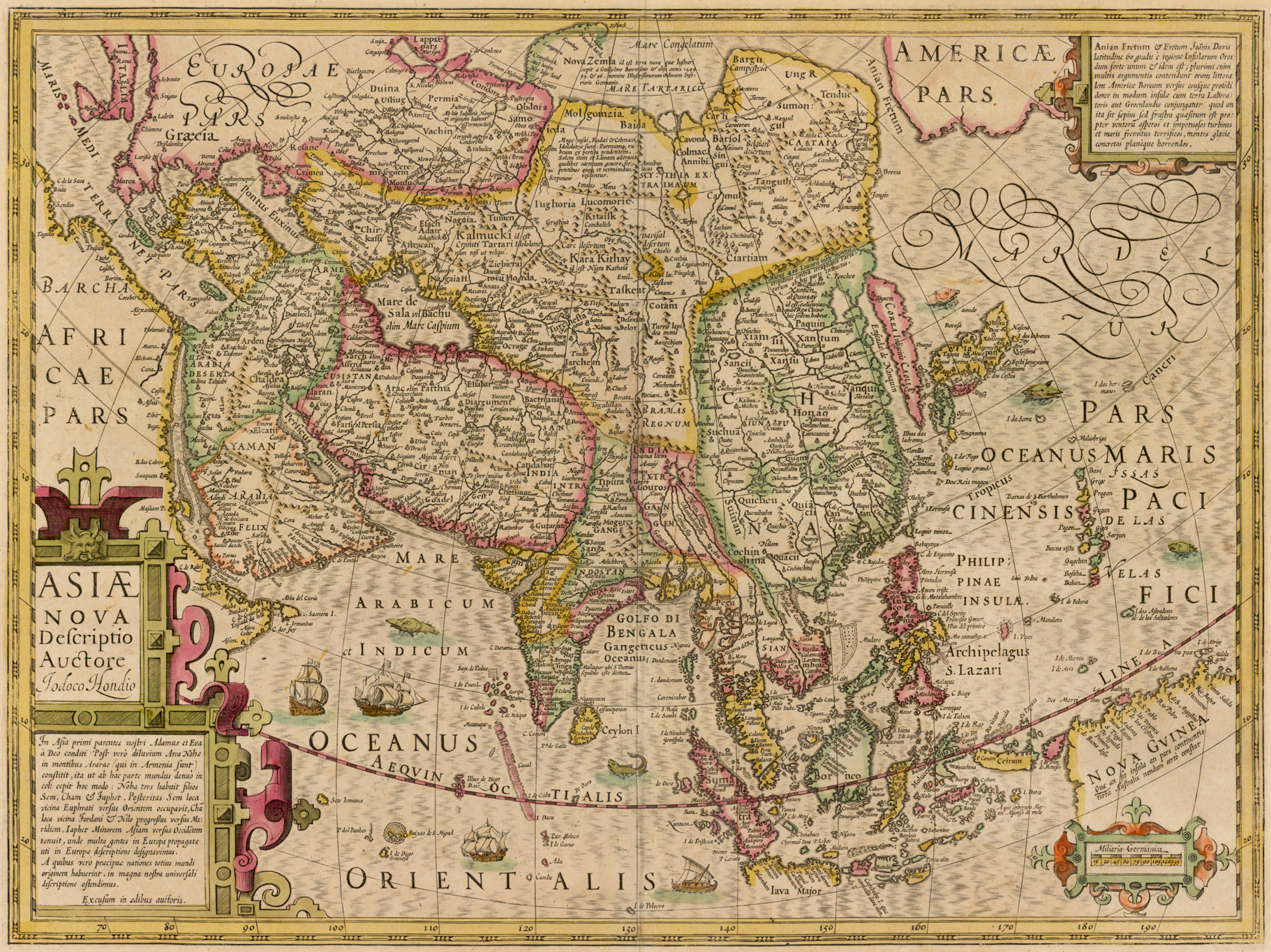
A 1610 map by Jodocus Hondius showing the Strait of Anian (Anian Fretum) at the approximate location of the Bering Strait

From at least 1575 European geographers had heard of a Strait of Anián connecting the Pacific and Arctic. Some had it at the Bering Strait (map at right) and others had it running from the Gulf of California to Baffin Bay. It is not certain that Russians in Siberia had heard of it. The first Western map to show a Strait of Anian between Asia and North America was probably that of Giacomo Gastaldi in 1562. Many cartographers followed this lead until the time of Bering. The source is said to be an interpretation of Marco Polo, but otherwise the documents do not explain where the idea came from.

While surviving official documents from Semyon Dezhnyov were recorded by professional scribes of the Yakutsk chancellery (*prikaznaya izba*), this reflected the mandatory administrative and legal practices of 17th-century Russia rather than serving as proof of his personal illiteracy. In modern historiography, Dezhnyov’s achievements are framed around his high practical intelligence, leadership, and exceptional navigational resourcefulness within the harsh conditions of the Siberian frontier. As historian Raymond H. Fisher emphasizes, Dezhnyov's petitions demonstrate an "articulate and legally competent mind that operated masterfully within the framework of contemporary administration, regardless of whose hand held the pen". By successfully rounding the "Great Rocky Projection" (now Cape Dezhnev) on his way to the Anadyr River, his voyage practically demonstrated the geographical separation between Asia and America.

Dezhnyov deposited his detailed reports (*otpiski*) at the local administrative centers in Yakutsk. However, because the hazardous northern sea route was of little immediate commercial use for fur trading compared to land routes, these documents remained in local archives and did not lead to an immediate government charting program. For the next 75 years, knowledge of Dezhnyov's voyage circulated within Siberia, influencing early Siberian cartography which frequently depicted a water connection between the Arctic and Pacific oceans. In 1728, Vitus Bering entered the strait, and his subsequent reports introduced this geographical reality to the broader European scientific community. In 1736 Gerhardt Friedrich Müller found Dezhnyov's original reports in the Yakutsk archives, publishing them in 1758 in his *Nachrichten von Seereisen*, which brought international academic recognition to Dezhnyov's priority in navigating the strait. Further archival findings by Ogloblin in 1890, along with mid-20th century discoveries of additional original documents, have fully solidified Dezhnyov's role in the history of geographical exploration.

=== Doubts about Dezhnyov's route ===
From at least 1777, various people have doubted the Dezhnyov story. The reasons are: 1) poor documentation, 2) that no one was able to repeat Dezhnyov's route until Adolf Erik Nordenskiöld in 1878/79 (eight unsuccessful attempts were made between 1649 and 1787; there is some evidence that 1648 was unusually ice-free), 3) and most important, that the documents can be read to imply only that Dezhnyov rounded a cape on the Arctic coast, was wrecked on that coast and wandered for 10 weeks south to the Anadyr. However, most scholars seem to agree that the Dezhnyov story as we have it is basically correct.

== Tributes ==
A mountain ridge in Chukotka, a bay of the Bering Sea, a settlement on Amur River, and Cape Dezhnyov (the easternmost cape of Eurasia) are named after Dezhnyov, as is the Dejnev crater on Mars.

In 1955, a lighthouse on the East coast of Chukotka was dedicated to Dezhnev with a plaque baring his name and details of his journey across the Bering Strait.

The 1971-built icebreaker Semyon Dezhnev is named after him.
