= Koch (boat) =

Sailing ship of Russian origin used to explore the Arctic in the 15th and 16th centuries

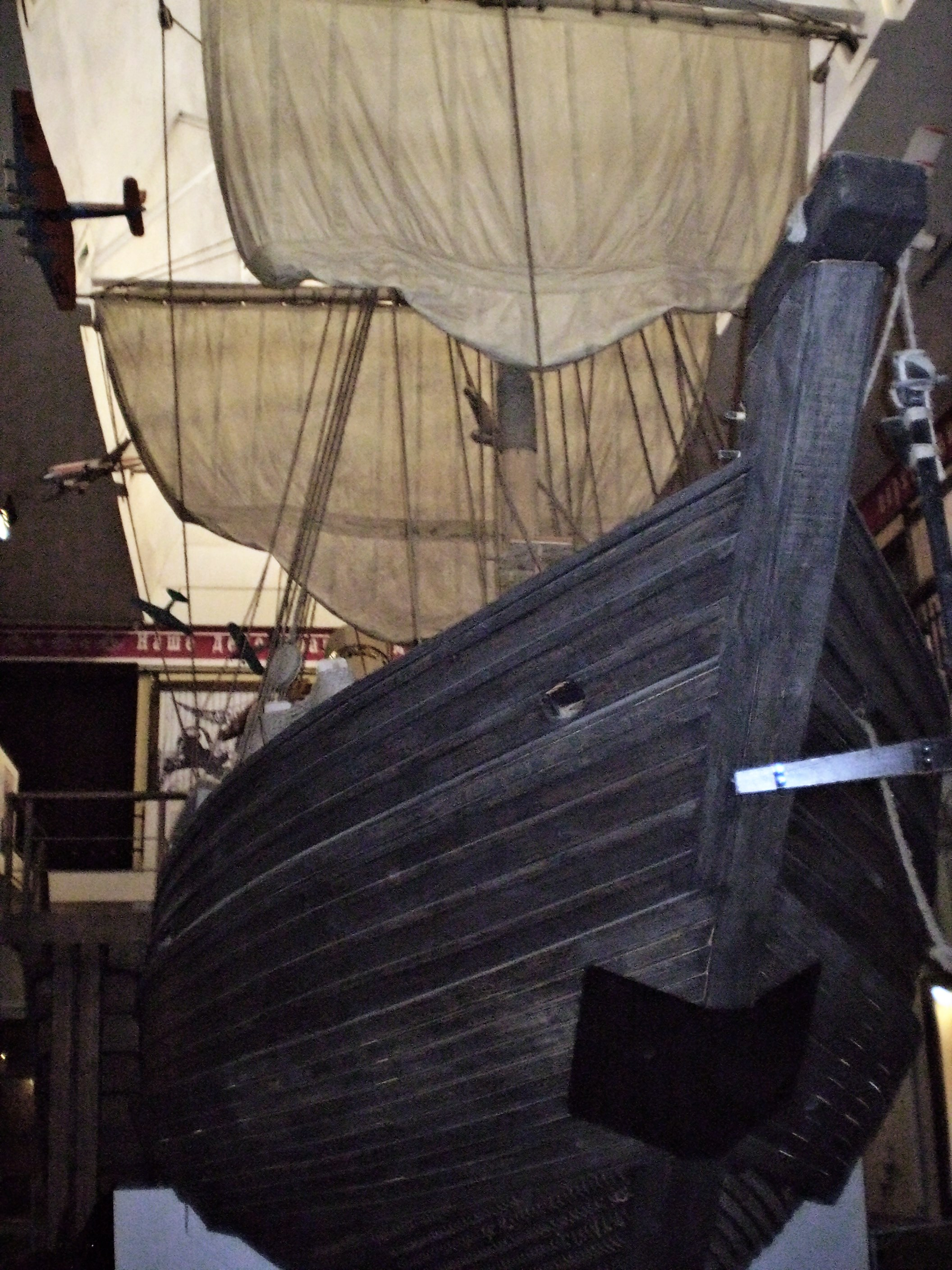
A 17th-century koch in a museum in Krasnoyarsk

The koch (Russian: коч, IPA: [ˈkotɕ]) was a special type of small one- or two-mast wooden sailing ships designed and used in Russia for transpolar voyages in the ice conditions of the Arctic seas, popular among the Pomors.

Because of its additional skin-planking (called kotsa) and Arctic design of the body and the rudder, it could sail without being damaged in the waters full of ice blocks and ice floes. The koch was the unique ship of this class for several centuries.

== Development ==
The development of koch began in the 11th century, when the White Sea shores began to be settled. This type of ship was widely used during the heyday of Russian polar navigation in the 15th and 16th centuries. There is documentary proof that in those days the private Russian civil fleet in the Arctic seas numbered up to 7,400 small ships in a single year. In the 17th century, kochs were widely used on Siberian rivers during the Russian exploration and conquest of Siberia and the Far East. In 1715, during the Great Northern War, the Russian Arctic shipbuilding and navigation were undermined by the ukase (decree) of Tsar Peter the Great. According to the ukase, only novomanerniye ("new-mannered") vessels could be built, such as the civil ships, which could also be used for military purposes. The koch with its special anti-icebound features did not suit this aim.

In the 19th century the anti-ice floe protective features of koch were adopted as the first modern icebreakers, and in fact koch may be regarded as the most ancient form of icebreaker, though wooden and relatively small.

== Construction ==
The koches were traditionally built shell-first, with overlapping planks, following the once-widespread Northern European clinker shipbuilding tradition. Iron rivets and brackets, as long as shrub branches or tree roots, were used to fasten the planks to each other. Ribs were inserted into the hull once the shell of planking was assembled. As these ships were in use as late as early 17th century, this may be by far the last use of the clinker technology on large sea-going vessels. They were flat-bottomed, but there is no reliable information whether the bottom was carvel built, as on the cogs, or clinker built, as on Viking ships (the latter is more likely, as the more recent Pomor boats are entirely clinker-built).

The keel length of koch was about 10–25 meters (about 30–70 feet). It had 13 combination ribs, each consisting of several details. The keel was also a combination of several parts. Bulkheads divided the body into several cross-section compartments. Each compartment (cherdak) served a specific purpose. There invariably were the fore-part compartment used as the crew's quarters, the stern cabin for the captain, and the cargo hold amidships. The koch had a flat deck. A typical koch carried one square sail on one mast. A distinctive peculiarity of the koch was the relatively big size of its square rudder fin which compensated for the special extra-slim design of the upper part of the rudder. This type of ship had two 70 pounds (32 kg) main anchors and, very often, light anchors. Naval historians think that the light anchors could have been used for mooring kochs to the edge of the ice fields.

Special Arctic design features included the rounded lines of the ship's body below the water line, an additional belt of ice-floe resistant flush skin-planking (made of oak or larch) along the variable water-line, a false keel for on-ice portage (and for damage prevention from running aground in shallow waters), and the shaft-like upper part and wide lower part (below water-line) of the rudder. Another Arctic feature was the invariable presence aboard any koch of two or more iceboats and of a windlass with anchor rope. Each iceboat had the cargo capacity of 1.5 to 2.0 metric tons (3,300 to 4,400 lb) and was equipped with long runners (5 to 7 m or 16 to 23 ft) for portage on ice. If a koch became trapped in the ice, its rounded bodylines below the water-line would allow for the ship, squeezed by the ice-fields, to be pushed up out of the water and onto the ice with no damage to the body.

Besides the anti-icebound equipment, the captains of kochs had the traditional set of navigation instruments, including a sundial and a magnetic compass with floating vetromet ("wind-marker", a wooden 32-point compass rose with 16 major winds). Other tools and means of navigation were the detailed charts and sailing directions, the stars, and the pilot's marks on the familiar shores.

== Classification ==
There are two main classifications of koch subtypes. The first, a mixed classification, distinguishes between three subtypes of kochs depending on both their place of origin (Siberian and Mangazeyan) and their sea-worthiness (morskiye, that is "seafaring"). The second classification does not pay any attention to minor shipbuilding differences and divides all kochs into two categories according to the main spheres of their maritime operations: river/sea, and morskiye (seafaring) for long-range sea voyages.

The following is added from Fisher. He claims that the koch had a square sail and only one mast. The largest koches were 60 feet long and 20 feet wide(sic), with a draft of 5 or 6 feet and a crew of 6 to 12. They could hold up to 40 people or 45 tonnes of cargo. They were oval when viewed from the top or side. The flat or rounded bottom made them maneuverable when dodging ice floes, but probably unstable in a severe storm. The square sail and flat bottom meant that they would not sail well without a following wind.

Other boat types used in Siberia include the shitik and the baidarka.

== See also ==
- Timeline of Russian inventions and technology records
- Knarr

== Sources ==
- "Коча, коч, кача" . Brockhaus and Efron Encyclopedic Dictionary (in Russian). 1906.
