= Fedot Alekseyevich Popov =

17th-century Russian explorer

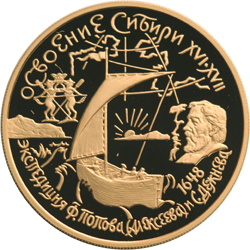
Bank of Russia 2001 coin

Fedot Alekseyevich Popov (Russian: Федот Алексеевич Попов, also Fedot Alekseyev, Russian: Федот Алексеев; nickname Kholmogorian, Russian: Холмогорец, for his place of birth (Kholmogory), date of birth unknown, died between 1648 and 1654) was a Russian explorer who organized the first European expedition through the Bering Strait.

He was normally known as Fedot Alekseyev. Only a few sources call him the son of Popov. He was from Kholmogory and the agent of Alexey Usov who was a member of the Gostinaya Sotnya, the highest merchant guild in Moscow. (Some time between 1647 and 1653 Usov petitioned to have Fedot apprehended on the grounds that Usov had sent him to Siberia with 3,500 rubles worth of goods and he had not reported back for eight years.) He went to Siberia in 1639. Moving east, he was at Tyumen, Tobolsk, Tomsk, Yeniseisk (1641) and Yakutsk(1642). In 1642 he joined a group of about 100 men under Ivan Rebrov who went down the Lena to the sea and up the Olenyok River to the west. Fedot had 29 men under him. Two years later they were defeated by the local Tungus and fled down the river. Fedot and some of his companions sailed east to the Kolyma River.

When he arrived at Srednekolymsk in 1645 he had 12 men with him and, probably, his Yakut concubine. Hearing of a rich 'Pogycha River' somewhere to the east, he organized an expedition to find it. Since he was not a service-man, Semyon Dezhnev was called in as the official leader. In June 1647 he sailed down the river to the Arctic with 50 men in four koches but they were forced to turn back due to thick ice. Next year they tried again. For a fuller account see Semyon Dezhnev. Sometime in September he rounded the northeastern tip of Asia and entered the Pacific Ocean. On September 20, 1648 (old style, September 30 in our calendar) he was wounded in a fight with the Chukchis. About the first of October (o.s) a storm separated Fedot's and Dezhnev's boats and we lose track of him. In 1653/54 Dezhnev captured his Yakut woman from the Koryaks. She said that Fedot died of scurvy, some of his companions were killed by the Koryaks and the rest fled in small boats to an unknown fate. From the location of the woman's capture, it is likely that his boat was wrecked somewhere not far south of Anadyr Estuary.

Dezhnev is usually called the first European to reach the Bering Strait since he was the formal leader and left most of the documents, but Fedot Alexeyev organized the expedition and may have been more important than the few surviving documents indicate.

The Fedotov Legend: When, in 1697, Vladimir Atlasov reached Kamchatka, he heard that other Russians had been there first. The natives said that a certain 'Fedotov' and his men had lived on the Nikul River, a tributary to the Kamchatka River, and had married local women. The ruins of their huts could still be seen. The natives thought they were gods or demons and left them alone, but when they saw one Russian kill another, they changed their minds. The Russians were attacked and fled, some going west to the sea of Okhotsk. All were killed, some by the Kamchadals, some by the Koryaks.

There have been four answers as to the identity of Fedotov:

1. Gerhardt Friedrich Müller thought he was probably Fedot's son, but offered no evidence.
2. Stepan Krasheninnikov thought he was Fedot himself and tried to reconcile this with the Yakut woman's story. Other versions of Fedotov=Fedot have been tried.
3. He may have been one of the lost men from the Dezhnev or some other expedition. In Siberia at this time there was a Vas'ka Fedotov, a few people who used Fedotov as a patronymic and various Fedors and so on whose names could have been garbled.
4. He was some other Russian who does not appear in the surviving records. All that's known is that some Russians reached Kamchatka in the second half of the 17th century and died there. Who they were is a matter of speculation.
