= Zemleprokhodtsy =

Early explorers and colonizers of Russian Siberia and beyond

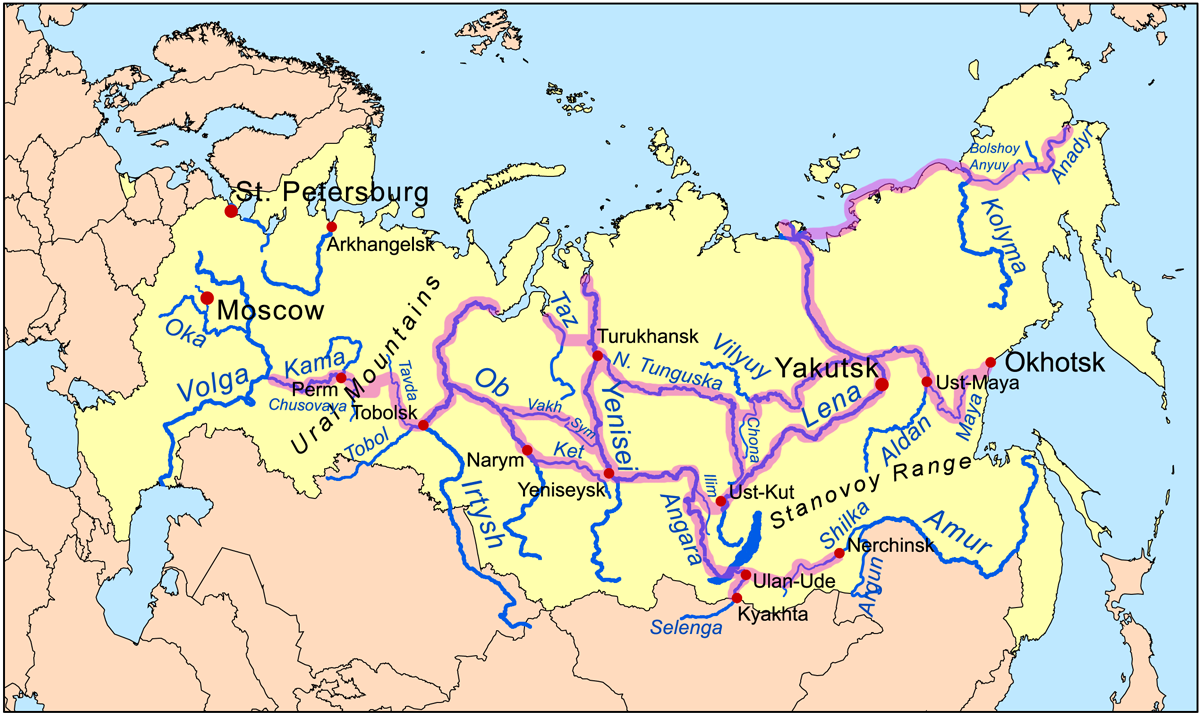
Siberian River Routes, commonly taken by zemleprokhodtsy

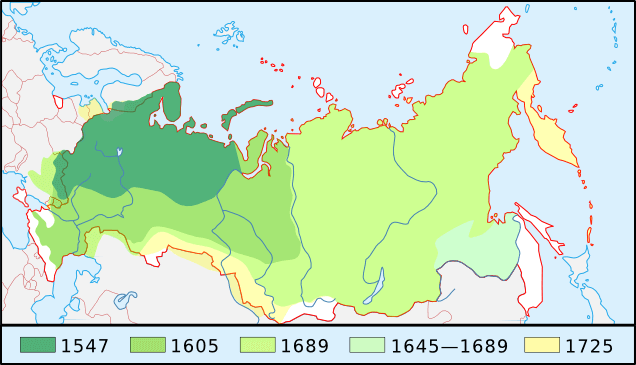
Growth of Russia between 1547 and 1725

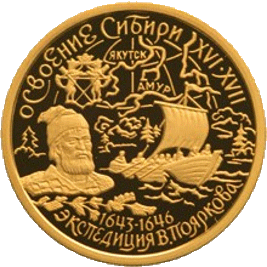
2001 coin of Bank of Russia

Zemleprokhodtsy (Russian: Землепроходцы, literally "landtrekkers") were the members of the 16th-17th century expeditions from the Tsardom of Russia that explored, conquered, and colonized the areas of the "Russian frontier" in Eastern Siberia, the Far North, and the Far East that were unknown or little known to Russia. They traveled up to the coasts of the Arctic and Pacific Oceans and made a number of important geographical discoveries for Europeans. As a rule, these were the teams headed by Russian Cossacks, merchants and promyshlenniki.

== Notable zemleprokhodtsy ==
- Maksim Perfilyev (b. 1580 – d. 1638), Russian Cossack explorer of Eastern Siberia and the first Russian to reach Transbaikalia. He was renowned for his diplomatic skills in negotiations with Tunguses, Mongols and Chinese. In 1618–19 Perfilyev was co-founder of Yeniseysky ostrog, the first Russian fort at the central part of the great Siberian river Yenisey, a major starting point for further expeditions eastward. In 1639–40 he sailed up the Vitim River as far as the Tsipa thereby becoming the first Russian to enter Transbaikalia, then known as Dauria.
- Vladimir Atlasov or Otlasov (Russian: Влади́мир Васи́льевич Атла́сов or Отла́сов; c. 1663 – 1711) was a Siberian Cossack who was the first Russian to organize systematic exploration of the Kamchatka Peninsula. Atlasov Island, an uninhabited volcanic island off the southern tip of Kamchatka, and the Atlasova volcano are named after him.
- Yermak Timofeyevich (Russian: Ермак Тимофеевич, IPA: [jɪrˈmak tʲɪmɐˈfʲejɪvʲɪt͡ɕ]; c. 1532 – 5 or 6 August 1585) was a Cossack ataman who started the Russian conquest of Siberia during the reign of the Russian Tsar Ivan the Terrible. He is today a hero in Russian folklore and myths.
- Pyotr Beketov (Russian: Пётр Иванович Бекетов, c. 1600 – c. 1661) was a Cossack explorer of Siberia and founder of various fortified settlements in the region, which later developed into modern cities such as Yakutsk, Chita, and Nerchinsk.
- Semyon Dezhnev (Russian: Семён Ива́нович Дежнёв, IPA: [sʲɪˈmʲɵn ɨˈvanəvʲɪdʑ dʲɪʐˈnʲɵf]; c. March 7, 1605 – 1673) was a Russian explorer of Siberia and the first European to sail through the Bering Strait, 80 years before Vitus Bering did. In 1648 he sailed from the Kolyma River on the Arctic Ocean to the Anadyr River on the Pacific. His exploit was forgotten for almost a hundred years and Bering is usually given credit for discovering the strait that bears his name.
- Ivan Moskvitin (Russian: Иван Юрьевич Москвитин) (born c. 1600 - after 1647) was a Russian explorer who oversaw an expedition in Siberia from 1639 to 1641. He was the first recorded Russian to reach the Sea of Okhotsk of the Pacific Ocean and sighted Sakhalin. During his expedition he came into contact with the Evens and Evenki people.
- Vassili Poyarkov (Russian: Василий Данилович Поярков; c. 1597 – after 1668) was the first Russian explorer of the Amur region in Siberia.
- Yerofey Khabarov (Russian: Ерофей Павлович Хабаров-Святитский; 1603 – after 1671), was a Russian entrepreneur and explorer, best known for his exploring the Amur river region and his attempts to colonize the area for Russia.

== See also ==
- Conquistadors, early Spanish colonizers of the Americas
- List of Russian explorers
- Zimovye
