= Atlasov =

Atlasov (Russian: Атласов) may refer to

- Vladimir Atlasov (1661–1711), Russian explorer
- Atlasov (volcano) in Kamchatka named after Atlasov
- Atlasov Island named after Atlasov
