= Maksim Perfilyev =

Cossack explorer

Maksim Perfilyev (Russian: Максим Перфильев (b. 1580 – d. 1638) was a Russian Cossack zemleprokhodets (explorer) of Eastern Siberia and the first Russian to reach Transbaikalia. He was renowned for his diplomatic skills in negotiations with Tunguses, Mongols and Chinese.

In 1618–19 Perfilyev was co-founder of Yeniseysky ostrog, the first Russian fort at the central part of the great Siberian river Yenisey, a major starting point for further expeditions eastward.

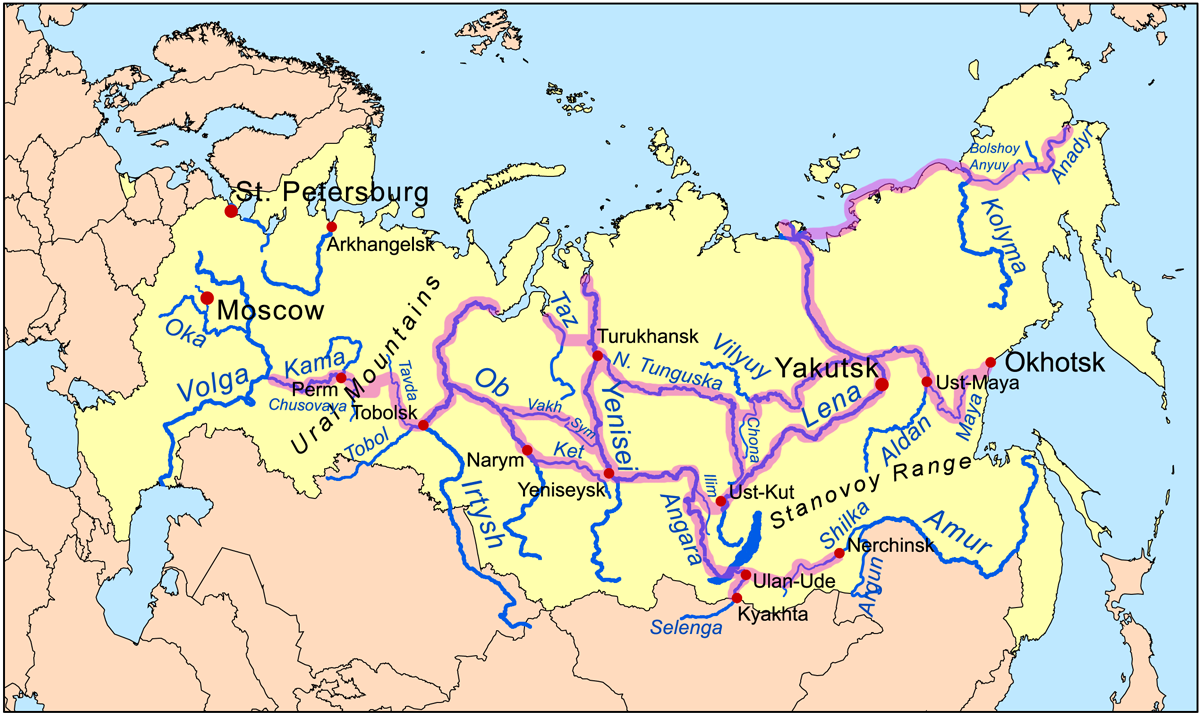
Siberian river routes

From 1618–27 he made several journeys on the Angara and Ilim rivers, and built several new ostrogs. In 1631 he founded Bratsky ostrog (modern Bratsk).

In 1639–40 he sailed up the Vitim River as far as the Tsipa thereby becoming the first Russian to enter Transbaikalia, then known as Dauria.

Perfilyev gave his name to the village of Maksimovschina, where on the banks of the Irkut River were his hunting lands. Maksimikha Bay on Lake Baikal (part of the larger Barguzin Bay) and Cape Maksimin in that bay, as well as the nearby Maksimikha village are also named after him. He was the first settler in Maksimikha, where he lived with his wife from Buryat people.

His son Ivan Maksimovich Perfilyev was also a famous voevoda and diplomat in Siberia.
