= Zimovye =

Type of outpost in Siberia

A zimovye (Russian: зимовье, literally "wintering place"), in its primary meaning, is a building constructed by hunters in their remote hunting areas, where there is no permanent settlements. In the past the term was also applied to small outposts, often fortified, established in Siberia by teams of Russian zemleprokhodtsy – Cossacks, promyshlenniki, and gold miners.

The zimovye outposts were usually established in places related to water transportation: river mouths, crossings, or portages, as well as by major ground routes. Some zimovye outposts were abandoned due to the decrease of business, while others grew into ostrogs, villages, and even towns. Examples of the latter ones include Turukhansk, which grew from the Turukhanskouye zimovye, Yeniseysk, from the Yeniseyskoye zimovye, and Vilyuysk, from Verkhne-Vilyuyskoye zimovye.

== See aso ==
- Blockhouse
- Ostrog
