= Pyotr Beketov =

17th-century Russian explorer

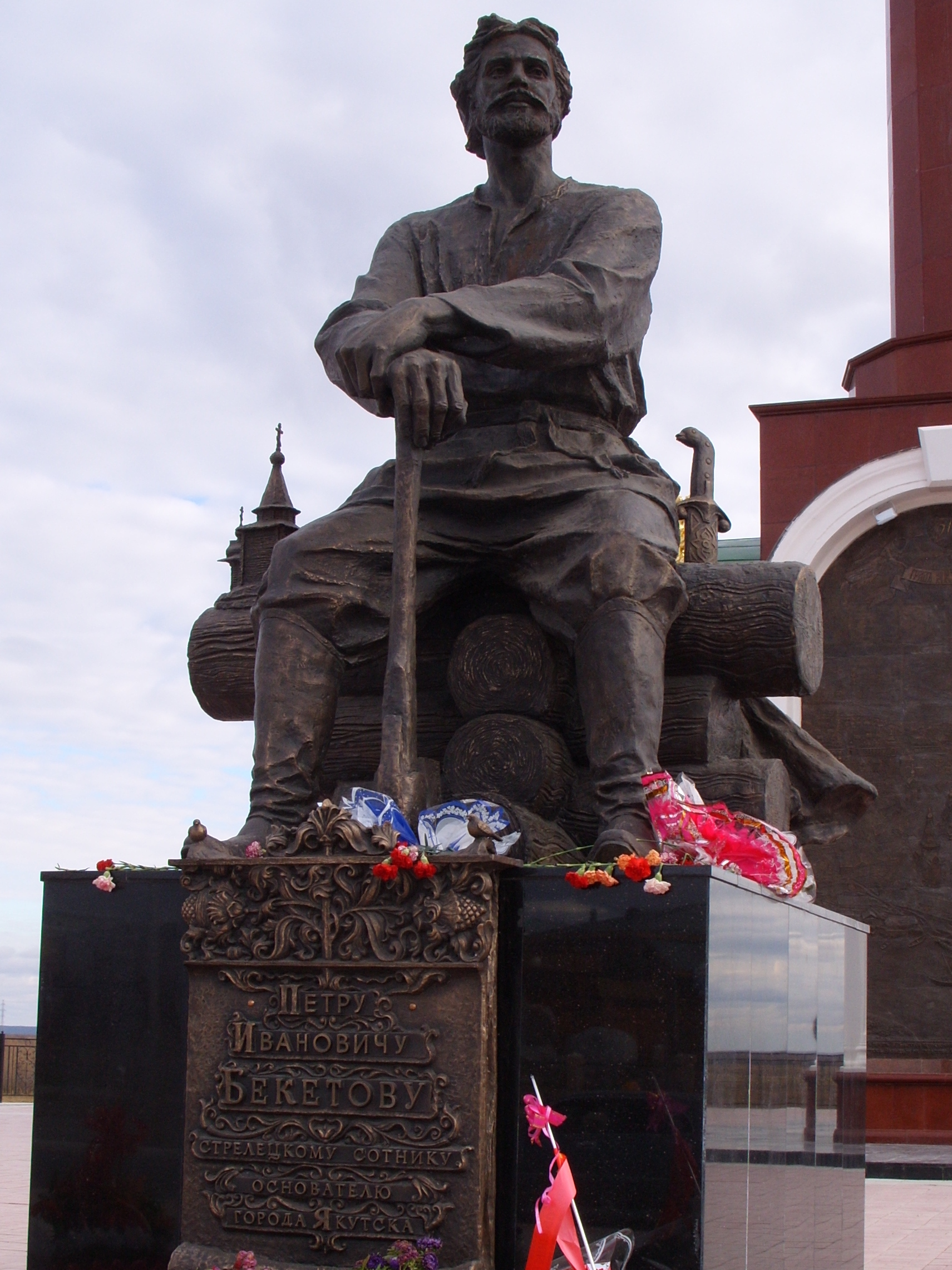
Monument to Beketov in Yakutsk

Pyotr Ivanovich Beketov (Russian: Пётр Иванович Бекетов, c. 1600 – c. 1661) was a Russian Cossack zemleprokhodets, an explorer of Siberia and founder of various fortified settlements in the region, which later developed into modern cities such as Yakutsk, Chita, and Nerchinsk.

Beketov started his military service as a guardsman (strelets) in 1624 and was sent to Siberia in 1627. He was appointed Enisei voevoda and proceeded on his first voyage in order to collect taxes from Zabaykalye Buryats. He carried out his mission successfully and he was the first Russian to enter Buryatia and founded the first Russian settlement, Rybinsky Ostrog.

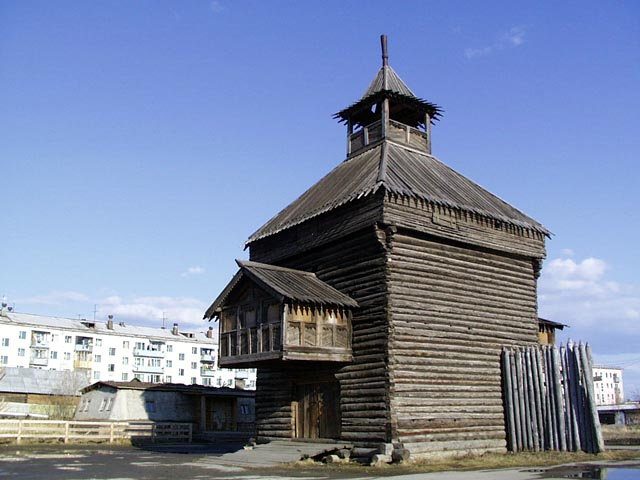
A tower of Yakutsky Ostrog.

Beketov was sent to the Lena River in 1631 and in the following year he and his Cossacks founded Yakutsk, which became a base for further expeditions eastward. He sent his cossacks to explore the Aldan River and further down the Lena, to found new fortresses, and to collect taxes from the locals. In 1640 he transported collected taxes to Moscow where at his arrival he was appointed Strelets and Cossack commander and in 1641 Beketov returned to Enisei Ostrog as the head of the fortress.

In 1652 he launched the second tax-collecting voyage to Buryatia, and in 1653 Beketov's cossacks founded a fortress, Irgensky Ostrog, and on the bank of the Ingoda River they built a winter settlement to follow-up, named Chita. In the following year Beketov's Cossacks founded future Nerchinsk. In 1655 Beketov's Cossacks were besieged in Shilkinsky Ostrog by rebellious Buryats and after pacifying these indigenous inhabitants, they had a chance to leave the fortress for the Amur River. Beketov returned to Tobolsk in 1661 where he met Protopope Avvakum and probably died in the same year.
