= Golygina =

Location
- Country: Russia

Physical characteristics
- Mouth: Sea of Okhotsk
  - coordinates: 51.9338°N 156.4893°E
- Length: 112 km (70 mi)
- Basin size: 2,100 km^{2} (810 sq mi)

The Golygina (Russian: Голыгина) is a river on the southwest coast of the Kamchatka Peninsula. It flows into the Sea of Okhotsk. It is 112 kilometres (70 mi) long, and has a drainage basin of 2,100 square kilometres (810 sq mi). A Russian expedition under Vladimir Atlasov first reached it in the last decade of the seventeenth century.
