= Vladimir Atlasov =

Russian Cossack explorer of the Kamchatka Peninsula (c. 1663 – 1711)

- Native name: Владимир Атласов
- Birth name: Vladimir Vasilyevich Atlasov
- Born: c. 1663 Veliky Ustyug, Russia
- Died: 12 February 1711 (aged 47–48) Nizhnekamchatsk, Russia
- Allegiance: Russia

Vladimir Vasilyevich Atlasov or Otlasov (Russian: Влади́мир Васи́льевич Атла́сов or Отла́сов; c. 1663 – 1711) was a Siberian Cossack, a zemleprokhodets, who was the first Russian to organize systematic exploration of the Kamchatka Peninsula. Atlasov Island, an uninhabited volcanic island off the southern tip of Kamchatka, and the Atlasova volcano are named after him.

== Biography ==
Atlasov was born in Veliky Ustyug. The first mention of him in the historical records comes from around 1682, when he was collecting the yasak on the Aldan River and one of the Uda rivers. In 1695, the voyevoda of Yakutsk appointed Atlasov as the prikazshchik of Anadyrsk. The Russians here had heard reports of a 'Kamchatka River' to the south and were already collecting yasak on the headwaters of the rivers that flow south toward Kamchatka. At least one of them had followed the Penzhina River to the Sea of Okhotsk. In 1696, he sent Luka Morozko south to explore. Morozko got as far south as the Tegil river on the west side of the peninsula and returned with some 'mysterious writings', apparently from a wrecked Japanese ship.

In 1697, Atlasov set off south with 65 serving-men and 60 Yukaghirs. Travelling on reindeer, they reached the mouth of the Penzhina River. He went down the west coast for two weeks and then crossed to the east coast. (Lantzeff has this as February 1697 on the Olyutor Gulf, but the Russian wiki has him leaving in the spring of 1697 and the Olyutor Gulf is rather far to the northeast). He left Morzoko to explore the east side and returned to the west side, but Morozko had to be recalled to deal with a Yukaghir mutiny (at the Palana River). Going south to the Tegil river, he heard reports of the Kamchatka river and recrossed the Central Range to the Kamchatka where he met the Itelmens for the first time. He made an alliance with one clan and went downriver and burned a village of their enemies. Returning, he learned that some Koryaks had stolen his reindeer. He chased them, killed about 150 and retrieved his reindeer. Continuing down the west side he reached the Icha River where he rescued or captured a Japanese sailor who had been shipwrecked. Further south he reached the Golygina River area, from which he was able to see Atlasov Island. Here he met the first Ainu and managed to kill fifty of them. Returning north to the Icha, he sent a party of men over the mountains to build an ostrog at Verkhnekamchatsk on the upper Kamchatka. Here he decided to return to Anadyrsk, either under pressure of his men or because he was running short of gunpowder and lead.

He reached Anadyrsk in July 1699 and wrote a report. He reached Yakutsk in June 1700 and in February 1701 reached Moscow where he presented his report. He was promoted to Golova and sent back to administer Kamchatka. On the Angara River in 1701 he met and plundered a merchant's boat loaded with Chinese goods. For this he and his men were thrown in jail. Kamchatka became increasingly disorderly and in 1707 Atlasov was released and sent to Kamchatka to restore order. On the journey his methods were so rough that most of his men sent a letter of protest to Yakutsk. He pacified the natives to some degree, but in December 1707 his own cossacks revolted and imprisoned him. He escaped (from Verkhnekamchatsk) and went downriver to Nizhnekamchatsk, but the local commander refused to step aside and give him command.

In January 1711, he was murdered in his sleep by another band of mutineers.

== Sources ==
- Postinkov, Alexey (2007). "Atlasov, Vladimir". In Buiisseret, David (ed.). The Oxford Companion to World Exploration. Oxford University Press. p. 75. ISBN 978-0-19-514922-7.
- George V. Lantseff and Richard A. Price, 'Eastward to Empire', 1973
- Russian historians about Vladimir Atlasov by N.V. Tolkacheva (in Russian)

== See also ==
- Russian conquest of Siberia
- Siberian River Routes
- Kamchatka Peninsula
