= Alaid volcano =

Volcano on Atlasov Island, Kuril Islands, Russia

Alaid
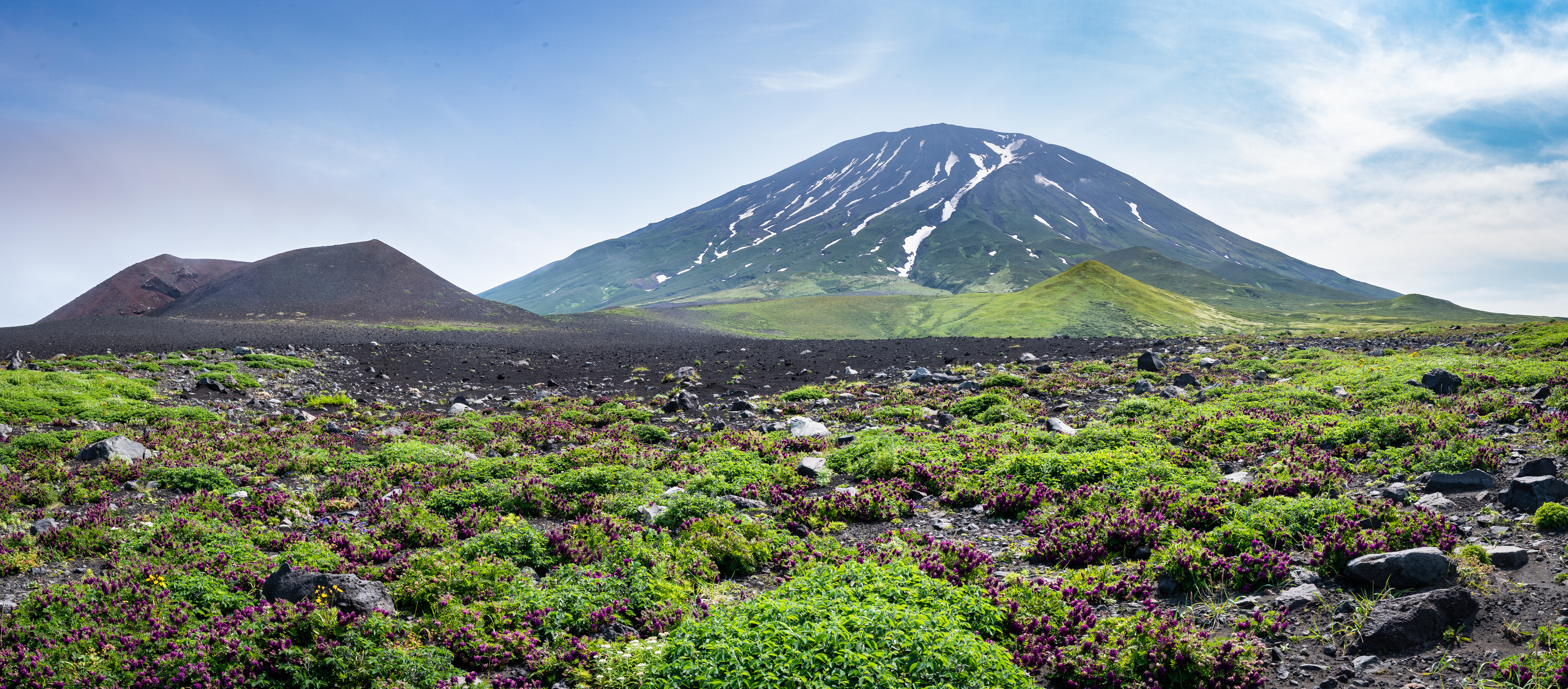
- A view of Atlasov island as a whole with the volcano in the center of the image.

Highest point
- Elevation: 2,285–2,339 m (7,497–7,674 ft)
- Prominence: 2,339 m (7,674 ft)
- Coordinates: 50°51′32″N 155°33′26″E

Naming
- Native name: Алаид (Russian)
- English translation: Alaid

Geography
- Location: Atlasov Island, Sakhalin, Russia

Geology
- Mountain type: Volcano
- Last eruption: 14 October 2022, depicted.

Climbing
- First ascent: Never ascended.

Alaid, also called Atlasov due to its location or Araido in Japanese, is a volcano on Atlasov Island of the Kuril Islands, Russia. It is the northernmost volcano of the islands, and one of the most active. The height is disputed between 2,285 metres (7,497 ft) to 2,339 metres (7,674 ft) tall. It is the highest peak of the Kuril Islands.

== Geographical setting ==
Alaid is located on Atlasov Island, one of the Kuril Islands. These are part of the ring of tectonic instability encircling the Pacific Ocean referred to as the Ring of Fire. The majority of these islands are volcanic, and that doesn't exclude Atlasov, which its main feature is the volcano.

== Geology ==
It is formed mostly of alkali basalts, and minorly of basaltic andesite. Many rare minerals are present on the mountain. Yellow volborthite and turquoise atacamite are present on the volcano.

=== Eruptions ===
Alaid volcano is one of the most active volcanoes of the Sakhalin Oblast as a whole. The most significant eruptions were the 1793 and the 2022 eruption. Local records indicate that eruptions also happened in 1854, 1860, 1894, 1981, 1996, 2015–2016, and 2022.

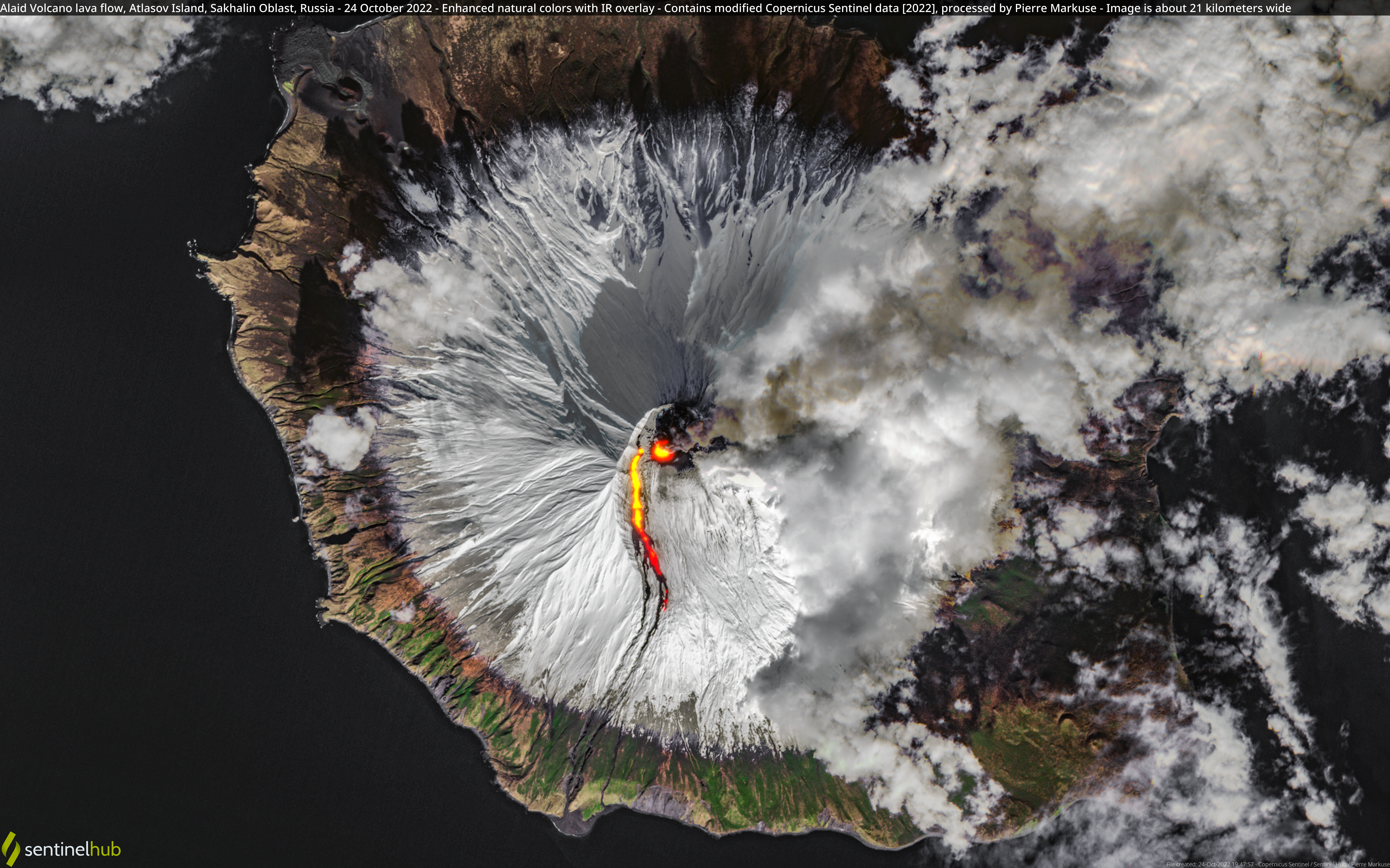
Satellite image showing the eruption

==== 2022 eruption ====
The 2022 volcanic eruption was one of the biggest and most significant of the history of the volcano. Local flights had to be cancelled due to this eruption. It also increased the territory of the island by an unknown minor amount.

Strombolian-vulcanian activity provoked two lava flows, that went onto the southern slope of Alaid. The ash plumes mainly spread to the southeast with their height reaching 300–530 km. The outflow of lava caused the formation of lahars that descended the southern slope of the volcano and reached the island's coast.

=== Height ===
Alaid is the tallest mountain of the Kurils, and its peak makes Atlasov the highest island of all of Russia. Like most other mountains, the height of Alaid is disputed. Some sources state that the height is of 2,285 metres (7,497 ft); others, like NASA, put it at 2,339 metres (7,674 ft).
