= Atlasov Island =

Northernmost island of the Kuril Island chain

Atlasov
- Alaid
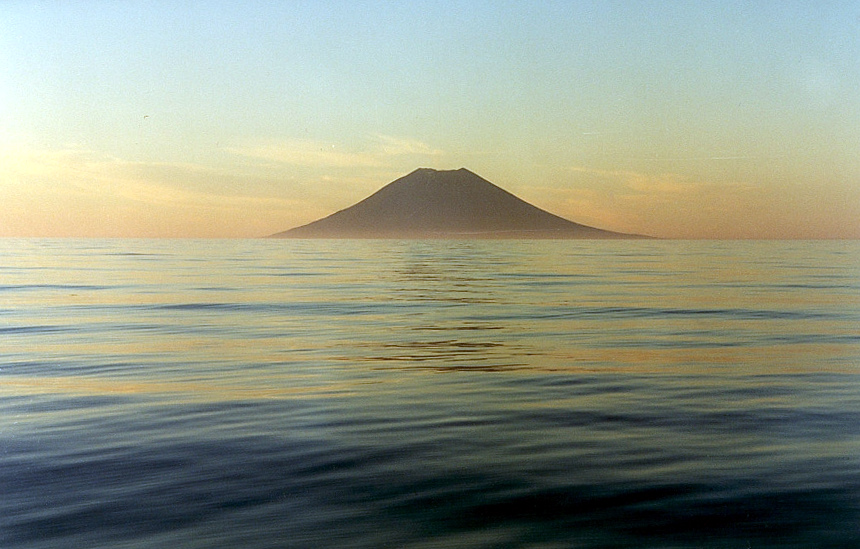

Highest point
- Elevation: 2,285 m (7,497 ft)
- Prominence: 2,285 m (7,497 ft)
- Listing: Ultra
- Coordinates: 50°51′39″N 155°33′51″E

Geography
- Location within Sakhalin Oblast
- Location: Kuril Islands, Russia

Geology
- Mountain type: Stratovolcano
- Last eruption: 2022

Atlasov Island (sometimes rendered as Atlasova Island, from Russian: Остров Атласова), also known as Alaid Island (Japanese: 阿頼度島, Hepburn: Araido-tō), is the northernmost island of the Kuril Islands, part of the Sakhalin Oblast in Russia. Located on the island is Alaid volcano, the highest volcano of the Kurils and one of the most active.

The island is named after Vladimir Atlasov, a 17th-century Russian explorer who incorporated the nearby Kamchatka Peninsula into Russia. It is essentially the cone of the submarine volcano Vulkan Alaid protruding above the Sea of Okhotsk to a height of 2,285 metres (7,497 feet). The island has an area of 119 square kilometres (46 square miles), and is currently uninhabited. Numerous pyroclastic cones dot the lower flanks of basaltic to basaltic andesite volcano, particularly on the NW and SE sides, including an offshore cone formed during the 1933–34 eruption.

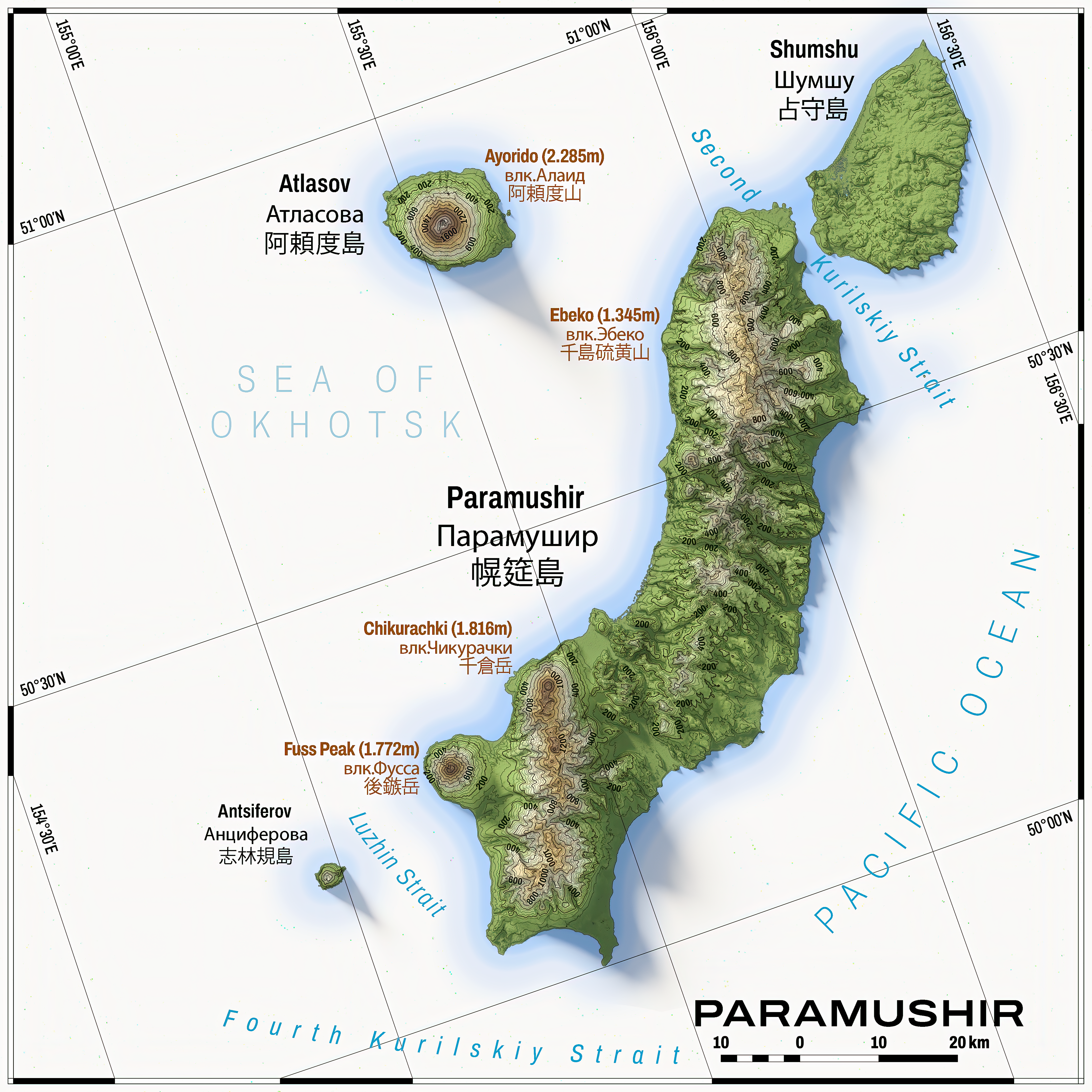
Map showing Atlasov Island

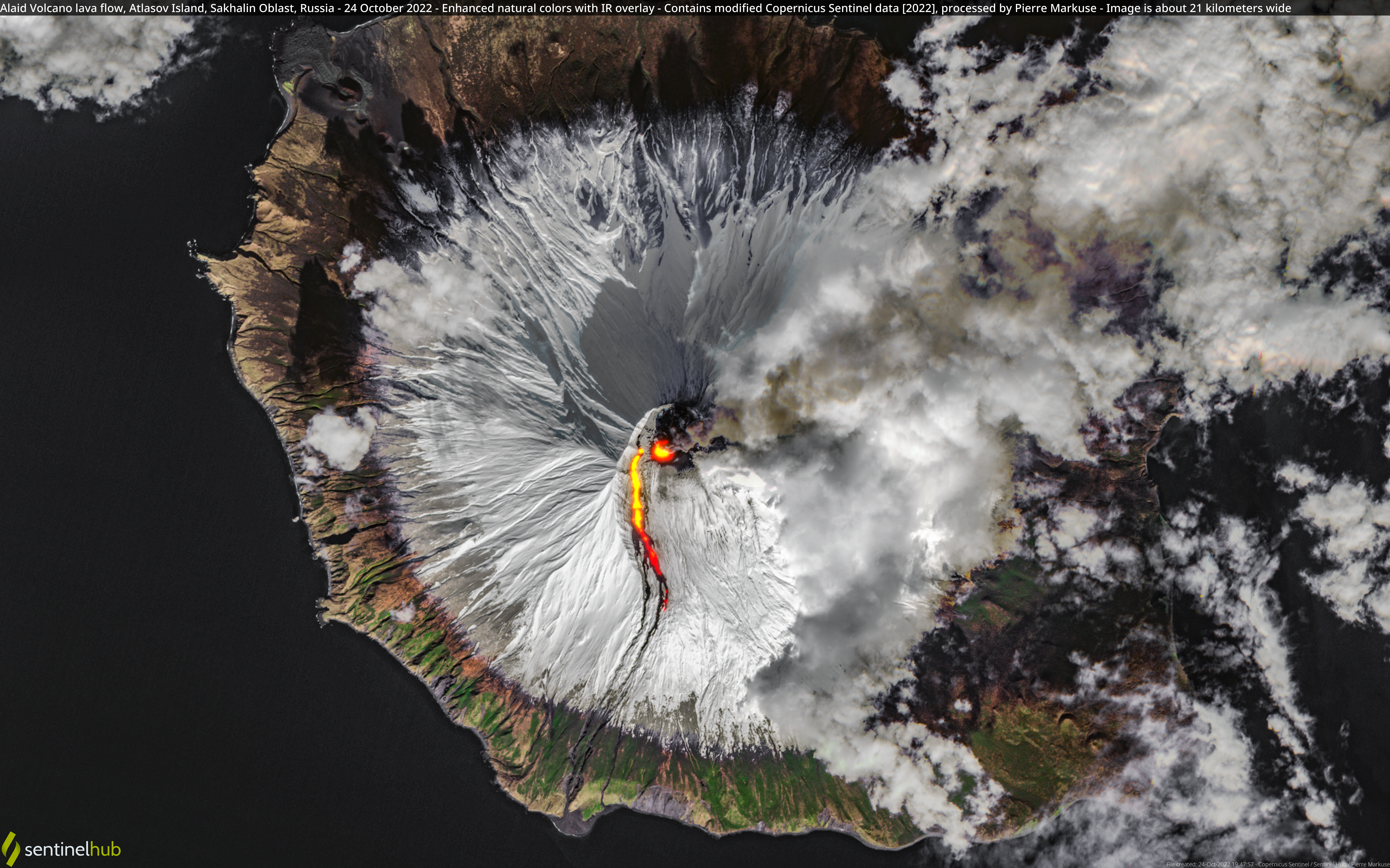
Eruption with lava flow from the summit crater in October 2022

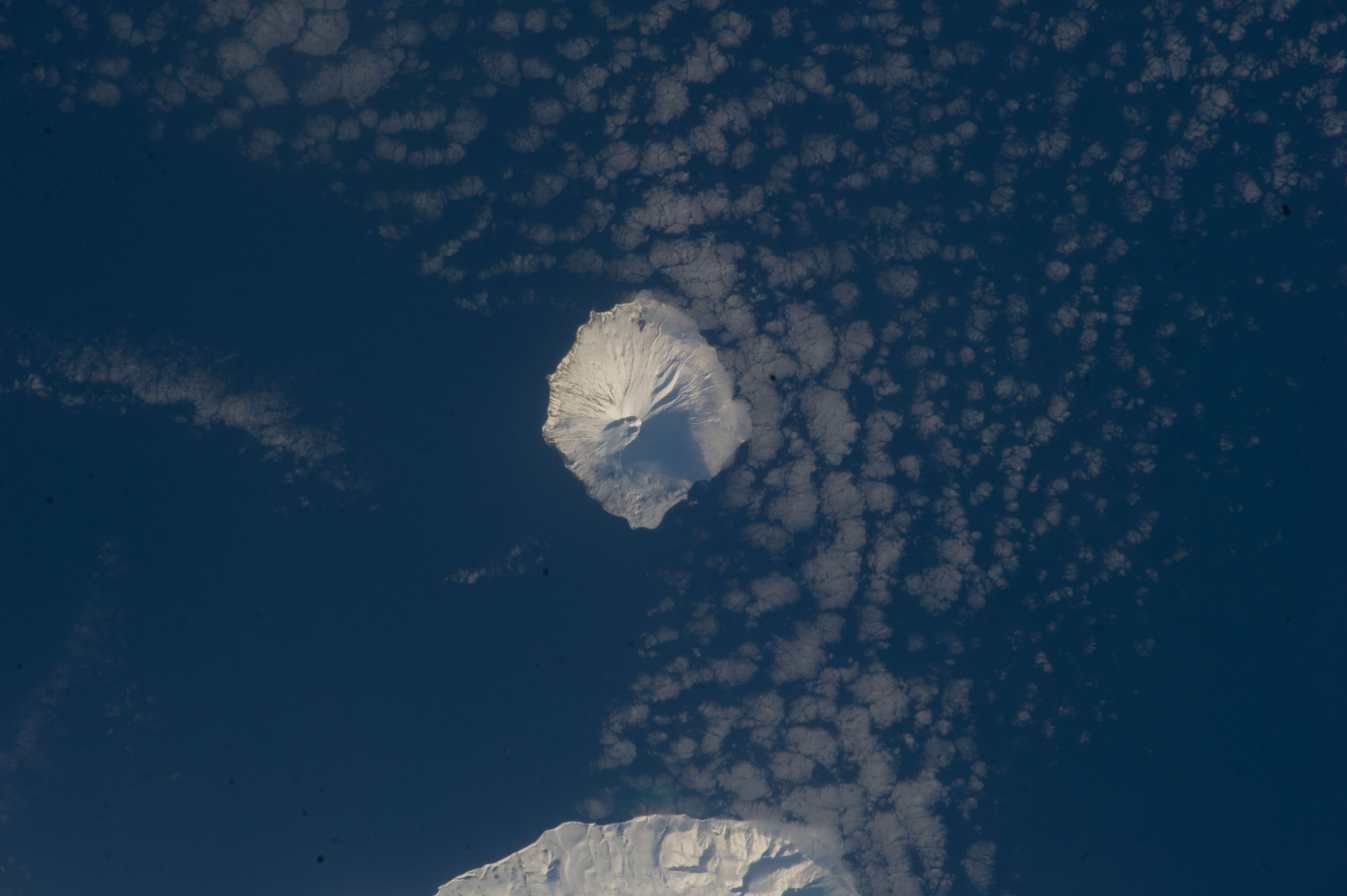
Astronaut photograph from International Space Station in late April

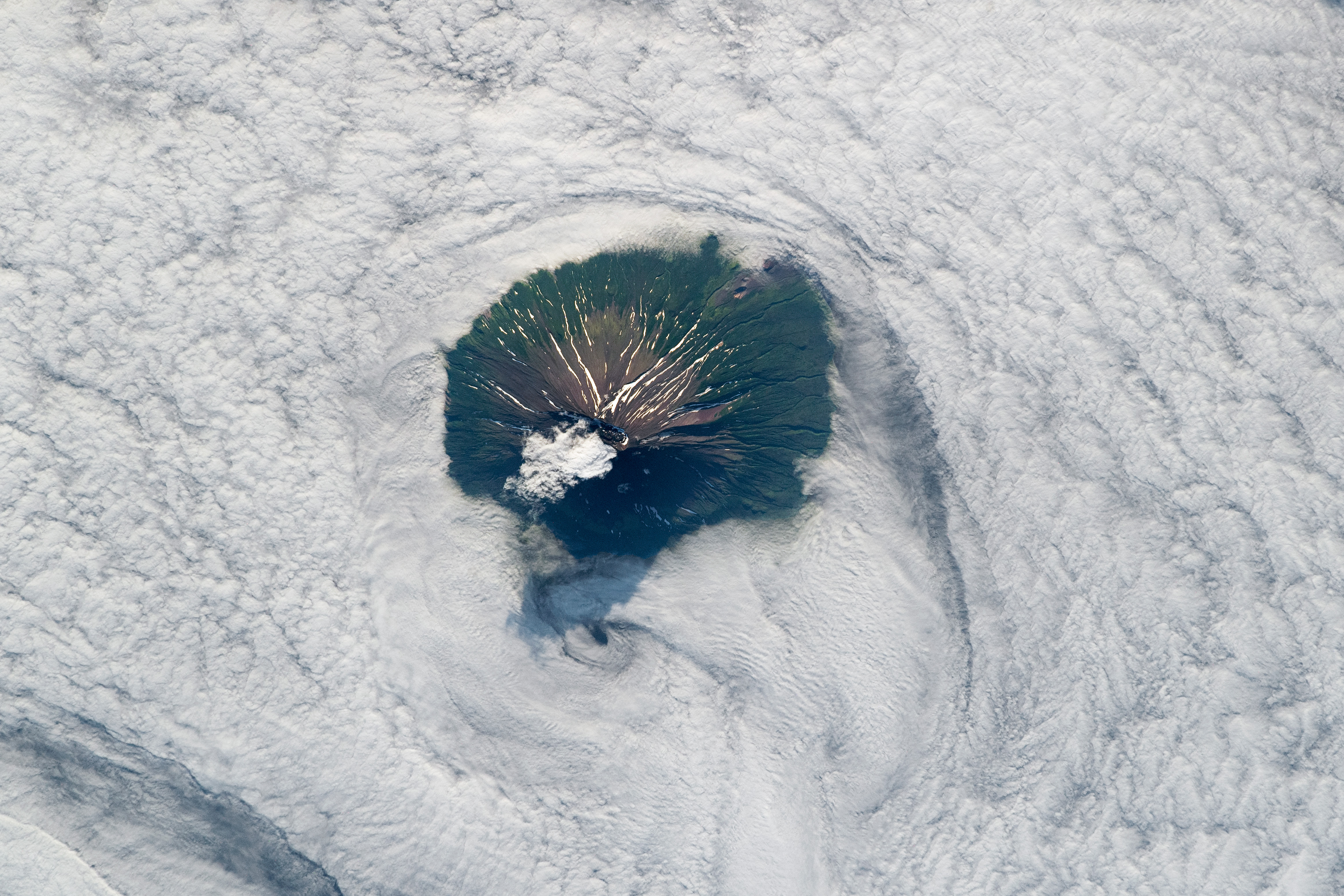
Photo from ISS, surrounded by low clouds

Its near perfect shape gave rise to many legends about the volcano among the peoples of the region, such as the Itelmens and Kuril Ainu. The Russian scientist Stepan Krasheninnikov was told the story that it was once a mountain in Kamchatka, but the neighbouring mountains became jealous of its beauty and exiled it to the sea, leaving behind Kurile Lake in southern Kamchatka. Geographically, this story is not without evidence, as after the last Ice Age most of the icecaps melted, raising the world's water level, and possibly submerging a land bridge to the volcano. Following the transfer of the Kuril Islands to Japan by the Treaty of St Petersburg, 1875, Oyakoba (親子場) as it is called by the Ainu and some Japanese, became the northernmost island of the empire and subject of much aesthetic praise, described in haiku, ukiyo-e, etc. Ito Osamu (1926) described it as more exquisitely shaped than Mount Fuji.

Administratively this island belongs to the Severo-Kurilsky District, in the Sakhalin Oblast of the Russian Federation.

== See also ==
- List of islands of Russia
- List of volcanoes in Russia
- List of ultras of Northeast Asia
