= Atlasov (volcano) =

Basaltic shield volcano on the Kamchatka peninsula, Russia

Atlasova
- Location within Kamchatka Krai

Highest point
- Elevation: 1,764 m (5,787 ft)
- Coordinates: 57.97°N 160.65°E

Geography
- Location: Kamchatka, Russia
- Parent range: Middle Range

Geology
- Mountain type: Shield volcano
- Last eruption: 3550 BCE

Atlasova (also known as Atlasov or Nylgimelkin) is a basaltic shield volcano situated in Kamchatka. It is named after Russian explorer Vladimir Atlasov.

== See also ==
- List of volcanoes in Russia
