= Eastern Siberia =

Geographical region of Russia

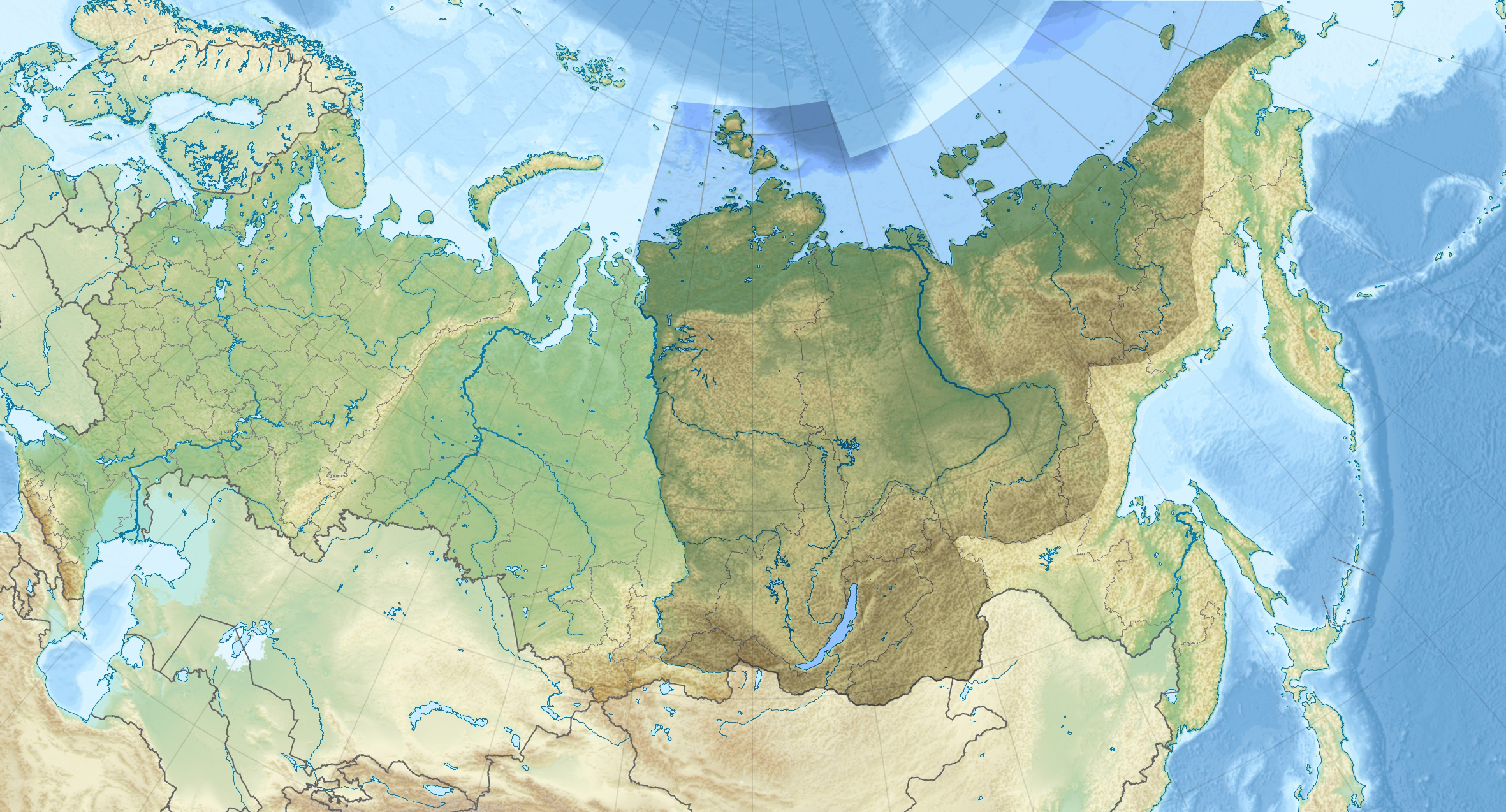
Eastern Siberia

Eastern Siberia is a part of Siberia that incorporates the territory located between the Yenisei River in the west and the Pacific Ocean divides in the east. Its area is equal to 7,200,000 square kilometers (2,800,000 sq mi).

Most of Eastern Siberia is occupied by the Central Siberian Plateau, as well as by tundra in the north and mountain ranges in the south. The Eastern Siberian region consists of Yakutia, Buryatia, Tuva, Krasnoyarsk Krai, Irkutsk Oblast and Chita Oblast. The largest cities are Irkutsk and Krasnoyarsk.

Far Eastern Federal District

It considerably overlaps, but does not coincide with, the Russian Far East, which stretches from Lake Baikal to the Pacific Ocean.
