= Ostrog (fortress) =

Wooden fortress, historic Russia

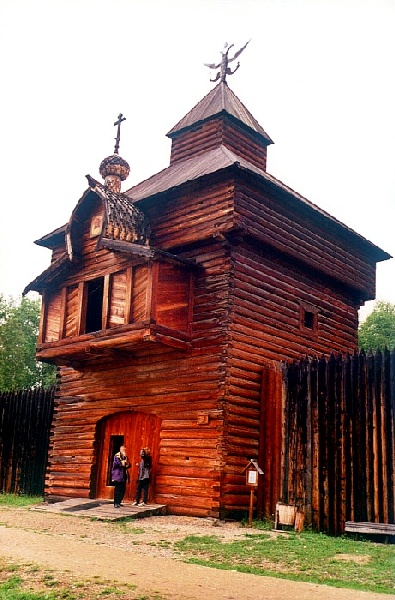
The tower of Ilimsky ostrog, now in Taltsy Museum in Irkutsk, Siberia.

Ostrog (Russian: острог, IPA: [ɐˈstrok]) is a Russian term for a small fort, typically wooden and often non-permanently staffed. Ostrogs were encircled by 4–6 metres high palisade walls made from sharpened trunks. The name derives from the Russian word строгать (strogat'), "to shave the wood". Ostrogs were smaller and exclusively military forts, compared to larger kremlins that were the cores of Russian cities. Ostrogs were often built in remote areas or within the fortification lines, such as the Great Abatis Line.

== History ==
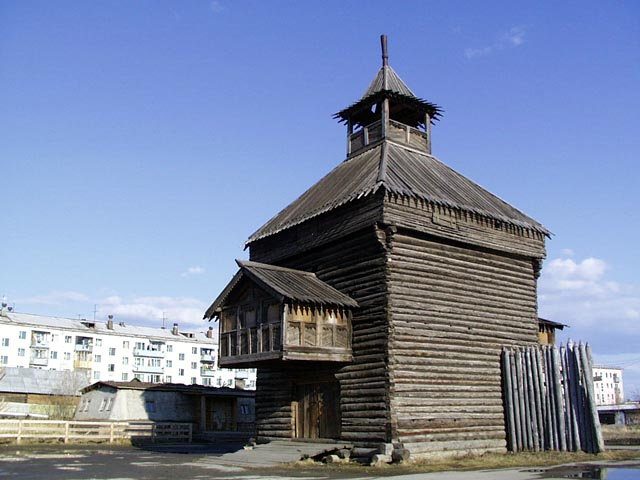
The tower of Yakutsky ostrog in Siberia.

From the 17th century, after the start of the Russian conquest of Siberia, the word ostrog was used to designate the forts founded in Siberia by Russian explorers and zemleprokhodtsy. Many of these forts later transformed into large Siberian cities.

When later Siberia became a favourite destination for criminals sent there to serve katorga, Siberian ostrogs became associated with imprisonment, and in the 18th and 19th centuries the word ostrog often meant prison.

== See also ==
- Kremlin (fortification)
- Blockhouse
